= William Kelly (artist) =

American-born Australian artist (1943–2023)

William Joseph Patrick Kelly OAM
- Born: May 4, 1943; Scranton
- Died: July 21, 2023 (aged 80); Nathalia
- Education: Philadelphia College of Art, Prahran College, National Gallery of Victoria Art School
- Notable work: Art Toward Reconciliation, travelling exhibition: Spain and Germany (2005-07)
- Style: Realism, Surrealism
- Movement: Humanism
- Spouse: Veronica
- Parents: William Joseph Patrick Kelly Sr. (father); Juliet Frances (née Touhill) (mother)
- Awards: Medal of the Order of Australia,
- Elected: Honorary Life Member ACCA

William Joseph Patrick Kelly OAM (1943–2023) was an American artist, art administrator, art teacher, humanist and human-rights advocate who from 1968 lived, studied and worked in Australia, In both solo and collaboratively in art projects he increasingly took a humanist and pacifist stance and across multiple media, including drawing, lithography, painting, wood-engraving, and computer-generated prints. He was the dean of the School of Art at the Victorian College of the Arts.

== Early life ==
William (Bill) Kelly was born to Juliet Frances (née Touhill) and William Joseph Patrick Kelly Sr. in Scranton, Lackawanna, Pennsylvania, on 4 May 1943, and was a steelworker before starting his artistic training at the Philadelphia College of Art, graduating in 1968. He then resided part-time in Australia after 1968 on a Fulbright Fellowship, with which he studied at Prahran College of Advanced Education, then at the National Gallery of Victoria Art School, receiving a Master’s Diploma.

== Career ==
In 1970, Kelly became a lecturer in drawing at the National Gallery School, before returning to New York to exhibit, but came back to Australia in 1975 to take up the position of Dean of the School of Art in the Victorian College of the Arts (1975–1982) following Lenton Parr. After seven years he stood down in favour of having more time to produce art and to spend with his family. He delivered several guest lectures at Prahran College, also at Yale Graduate School of Arts and Sciences, the New York Studio School and in Europe, South Africa, North America, Eastern Europe, Australasia.

In 1976 Kelly exhibited at the Melbourne University Gallery work which, as Maudie Palmer noted, involved "literally mapping out the figure or figures and their environment in relation to the picture plane", for which he at first used photographs before using live models exclusively.

Many of Kelly's works from the 1980s were aerial views of the subject, so the drawings, paintings or prints could be hung in any orientation and, as an American reviewer noted, such abnormal visual situations evoked a state of helplessness, anxiety and dehumanisation. In the 1980s he also designed a number of theatre sets and posters, made several films and initiated a number of urban arts and environmental design projects.

By 1981 Kelly was represented by Axiom Gallery, and in 1985 by Stuart Gerstman gallery, also in Melbourne. In 1982 he had started making computer-graphics work like Still Life: Children's Blocks (for T. Salvas) using an electronic stylus on a graphics tablet connected to an Apple II computer and one monochrome and one colour monitor, a medium that Kelly compared "to the feel of drawing on a soft-ground plate". Prints were made on a monochrome dot matrix or thermal printer. From the early 1980s Kelly worked with printmaking technician Larry Rawling in Fitzroy for his fine art prints, and later with Baldessin Press.

As well as making prints, drawings and paintings, Kelly collaborated on public art and theatre works, and wrote art scholarship, editing in 1984 the Heritage of Australian art: reflections of the history of Australian painters and paintings. In 1983, he was a member of the original steering committee for the Australian Centre for Contemporary Art.

Kelly had studios in Melbourne, Bethlehem, Pennsylvania, and Nathalia (his last place of residence). He was Founding and Honorary Life Member of the Australian Centre for Contemporary Art, Founding Member of the Urban Design Forum, and former member of the Board of the Australian Print Workshop and affiliate artist and supporter of the Baldessin Studio.

== Humanism ==
Kelly manifested humanist ideals in his imagery; for example working five years on an installation The Peace Project, in reaction to the Hoddle Street massacre which he exhibited in 1993 in both Melbourne and Boston, Massachusetts, and which received the Australian Violence Prevention Award. His work was exhibited in over 20 countries and, invited to Guernica in the mid-1990s, he visited annually to attend the commemoration of the bombing immortalised by Picasso in his 1937 work, and in 2001, Kelly was commissioned to engage younger people in the commemoration with his The Plaza of Fire and Light a temporary installation using candles surrounding a central bonfire, hailed by Basque artist and historian Alex Carrascosa as re-igniting "the fire of memory." Kelly's work traveled in group exhibitions throughout Europe and South Africa (representing Australia in the Dialogue Among Civilizations International Print Portfolio organised to coincide with the cultural activities of the 2010 FIFA World Cup).

Kelly edited an anthology, Violence to Nonviolence: Individual Perspectives, Communal Voices, poems, essays and short stories by Australian and international contributors renouncing violence, and which was published in 1994 and reprinted. His artwork has also appeared in other books, such as Cultures of Crime and Violence: The Australian Experience and in Cook and Bessant's Women's Encounters with Violence. Kelly's artworks are reproduced in publications worldwide and are represented in over 40 public and corporate collections.

In 2000 Kelly founded the Archive of Humanist Art, with prints and drawings of artists from all over the world that address humanist concerns. The projects have been linked to the Basque Country, Spain; Robben Island, site of the prison that once held Nelson Mandela; the Republic of Georgia and Northern Ireland.

In 2003 Kelly edited a volume Art and Humanist Ideals: Contemporary Perspectives, images in which are drawings, works of poster collectives and photographs by Judith Joy Ross and Nick Ut, and other material from the Archive of Humanist Art. Quintessential humanist texts are included (by Thomas Mann, Paul Tillich, Herbert Read) while contemporary contributors include Suzi Gablik, Gunter Grass, Vaclav Havel, Philippa Hobbs, Douglas Kellner, Lucy R. Lippard, Elizabeth Rankin, Barry Schwartz, and Nigel Spivey.

Mark Street in 2020 released Can Art Stop a Bullet?, a feature documentary on Kelly's life, work in the peace movement, and travels.

== Reception ==
Reviewing his 1970 exhibition at Watters Gallery not long after Kelly came to Australia, Ruth Faerber remarked that:

... American, William Kelly, expresses a very real and personally involved bias in his paintings of female nudes that overpowers and decidedly weakens their power as organised works. That he does not project love, but rather hate for his hard faced, hard muscled women makes him no less a sentimental and idealising illustrator. His academic life study nudes stand stiffly posed among the other wooden blocks used in his composition to give an illusion of realistic space. The only figure study that protrays [sic] any show of human response being the watery blue eyed male nude—and this in a blatantly obvious way!

Janet McKenzie writing in 1986 summarises the artist's concerns:

Kelly's exploration of the restrictions governing human behaviour is intimate and introspective. A recurring inventory of familiar images and objects brought together in tightly woven surfaces create tensions that parallel the relationships of people with their environment.

McCulloch (2006) notes that Kelly's "realistic paintings and drawings of nudes were made with a strong emphasis on drawing." In his 2006 catalogue essay to Markers Along the Way: An Exhibition of Prints by William Kelly at Shepparton Art Gallery, and as cited by Janet Mckenzie in Studio International, Godwin Bradbeer wrote a counter to Faerber's earlier impressions:

In some ways Kelly is like a Cézanne or Morandi, preoccupied obsessively with the formalities of his compositions and propositions within the theatre of the picture plane; but viewed retrospectively it is apparent that he has been engaged consciously and purposefully with ideals of conscience and intentions of social betterment that have been rarely, and only marginally, addressed by mainstream contemporary artists and institutions. With or without the figure [he] has always been humanist and philanthropic

== Later life ==
Kelly died in Nathalia on 21 July 2023, where in 2010 he and his partner Veronica Kelly initiated the G.R.A.I.N. Store, a community gallery, workshop and performing space.

== Awards ==
- 1968: Fulbright Fellowship
- Kelly received the Courage of Conscience Award for his role as an international artist, humanist, human rights advocate, and founder of the Archive of Humanist Art from The Peace Abbey in Sherborn, Massachusetts.
- 26 January 2008, and living then in Nathalia, he was recipient of the Medal of the Order of Australia (OAM) (for "Service to the Arts As A Visual Artist, and to Urban Design").
- Kelly was awarded a State Library of Victoria Creative Fellowship for Fellow travellers: an unfolding story on Australian visual artists practising since World War I and their beliefs about war and peace.
- Australian Film Commission grant
- Myer Foundation grant

== Selected publications ==
- Kelly, William; Zimmer, Jenny, eds. (2003). Art and humanist ideals: contemporary perspectives with artworks selected from the collection of the Archive of Humanist Art: an anthology. South Yarra, Vic., Australia: Macmillan. ISBN 978-1-876832-25-4.
- Kelly, William, ed. (1994). Violence to non-violence : individual perspectives, communal voices : an anthology, with prints from the Peace Project. Camberwell, Vic.: Harwood Academic Publishers; Craftsman House. ISBN 976-8097-88-4.

== Selected exhibitions ==
- 1970, March: Colonial paintings, Brian Seidel, William Kelly. Strines Gallery, Carlton
- 1970, 17 June–4 July: Watters Gallery
- 1976, 11–16 September: 1976 Caulfield City Council Invitation Art Exhibition (judges incl. Eric Westbrook) with Robin Angwin, Ian Armstrong, John Borrack Jeffrey Bren, Charles Bush, Noel Counihan, Jack Courier, Karl Duldig, Lesley Dumbrell, Geoff La Gerche, Robert Grieve, Murray Griffin, Dale Hickey, George Johnson, Graham King, Inge King, Helen Maudsley, James Meldrum, Erica McGilchrist, Andrew McLean, Ailsa O’Connor, Michael Shannon, Andrew Sibley, Eric Thake, Phyl Waterhouse
- 1978, 3 November–4 December: MPAC Prints. Mornington Peninsula Arts Centre
- 1979, 10–22 March: William Kelly Drawings and Paintings. Powell Street Gallery
- 1982, 1 April: William Kelly. The Butler Institute of American Art. USA
- 1984, 12 May–10 June: William Kelly. Swan Hill Regional Gallery
- 1984, October: Figures and Faces Drawn from Life, group show. Heide Gallery
- 1985, April: Gold Coast City Art Prize. Judge Elwyn Lynn recommended purchases of works by Sydney Ball, Kate Briscoe, Rod Ewins, David Fairbairn, Pat Hoffie, George Johnson, William Kelly, Rod McMahon, Ian Smith and Fernando Solano
- 1987: Modern Art II: International, Budapest, Hungary
- 1987 Contemporary Australian Art, Queensland Art Gallery, and Museum of Modern Art, Saitama, Japan
- 1988, 1 August–1 September: Mitchelton Print Exhibition, Interior motives. Multiple venues
- 1990: The Peace Show prints, drawing, paintings, video and books
- 1991: Drill Hall, Australian National University
- 1993, April to June: William Kelly Life in Australia: A Contemporary Tragedy. Heide Park and Art Gallery
- 1994: Violence to Non-violence: prints from The Peace Project by William Kelly. Imagine The Future's Access Gallery
- 1998-2000; Humanist Art/Symbolic Sites, travelling exhibition: Spain, Northern Ireland, USA, South Africa, Australia, .
- 1999, 9 October–5 November: William Kelly: Unconditional love and goodwill. A decade of art by William Kelly. Bulle Galleries
- 2005-07: Art Toward Reconciliation, travelling exhibition: Spain and Germany
- 2006, from 9 April: Heart and Mind, Rick Amor, Jenny Watson, Melinda Harper, Jan Senbergs and William Kelly. TarraWarra Museum of Art
- 2006, 20 July–20 August: Markers Along the Way: An Exhibition of Prints by William Kelly. Shepparton Art Gallery
- 2009, 9 October–8 November: The Counihan connection: Eight contemporary artists respond to the work of Noel Counihan. Counihan Gallery
- 2012, 6 June–1 July; William Kelly and Emma de Clario. MARS Melbourne Art Room, Port Melbourne
- 2013, 23 March–13 April: Australian prints from the 1960s and 1970s from the collection of R.E. Nott including commissioned prints from the Print Council of Australia. Bridget McDonnell Gallery, Hampton
- 2018/19, 16 November–16 February: Impressions. Australian Print Workshop Gallery (APW)
- 2021, 29 May–19 June: William Kelly: Can art stop a bullet? Works from Guernica and the documentary film. Charles Nodrum Gallery
- 2022, 9 April–22 May: William Kelly: Towards the Big Picture, in association with the Human Rights Arts and Film Festival 2022

== Collections ==
- National Gallery of Australia
- National Portrait Gallery, Australia
- Heide Gallery and Museum
- State Library of Victoria
- Home for Humanity
- Shepparton Art Museum
- Victorian College of the Arts
- TarraWarra Museum of Art
- Victorian Tapestry Workshop
- Gernika Bakearan Museoa (Guernica Peace Museum), Spain
- Durban Art Gallery, South Africa
