= Tweddle =

Tweddle may refer to:

People:

- Beth Tweddle MBE (born 1985), English gymnast
- Dominic Tweddle, English archaeologist, Director General of the National Museum of the Royal Navy
- Don Tweddle Jr. (born 1979), AKA "Twedds", Australian former rugby league footballer
- Isabel May Tweddle (1875–1945), Australian painter
- Lynn Ferguson Tweddle (born 1965), Scottish writer, actress, and story coach

Places:

- Tweddle Farmstead, Registered Historic Place in the Town of Montgomery in Orange County, New York
- Tweddle Place, Edmonton, residential neighbourhood in Edmonton, Alberta, Canada

== See also ==
- Tweddle v Atkinson EWHC QB J57, (1861), an English contract law case concerning the principle of privity of contract and consideration
- Twaddle
- Tweddell (disambiguation)
- Tweeddale
- Tweedle (disambiguation)
- Twiddle (disambiguation)
- Waddle (disambiguation)
- Weddle
