= Eric Thake =

Australian artist (1904–1982)

- Born: Eric Prentice Anchor Thake; 8 June 1904; Auburn
- Died: 3 November 1982 (aged 78); Geelong
- Education: National Gallery of Victoria Art School, George Bell school
- Occupations: graphic designer, printmaker, painter
- Years active: 1930–1970s
- Known for: graphic arts, linocuts, painting, photography
- Notable work: An Opera House in Every Home, 1972 linocut
- Style: Modernism
- Spouse: Grace Godfrey
- Children: John van Sommers, Peter van Sommers, Joan, Jennifer
- Parents: Henry (father); Emily (née Doran) (mother)

Eric Prentice Anchor Thake (8 June 1904 – 3 November 1982) was an Australian artist, designer, painter, printmaker and war artist.

His 1972 Christmas card An Opera House in Every Home, a humorous take on Jørn Utzon's World Heritage-listed building is a well-known work.

== Early life and education ==
Thake was born in Auburn, Melbourne, on 8 June 1904, the only child of Emily Lockwood (née Doran) and Henry Thake, dairyman. The family lived in Lingwell Rd, East Hawthorn, until 1915, when they moved to Marara Rd., Caulfield.

Educated at Auburn Central Primary School, at age fourteen and at the end of WW1 Thake was apprenticed to a Melbourne process engraving firm Patterson Shugg. He enrolled in 1922 in evening classes at the Drawing School of the National Gallery of Victoria under traditionalist painters Bernard Hall and W. B. McInnes, then went on to study painting and drawing part-time with the modernist Melbourne artist George Bell from 1925 to 1928, and started making metalcut prints on his employer's used stereotyping plates (composed of an alloy primarily of lead with tin, and antimony). After joining the Paton Advertising Agency in 1926, he enrolled at the Working Men's College the following year. In 1935 he married Grace Bessie Doris Godfrey.

== Career ==
Thake first exhibited in 1929 in the Society of Artists' Decorative Exhibition in Sydney. From June 1930 Thake showed with 'The Embryos,' a group that included Raymond Lindsay, a son of Norman Lindsay, Constance Parkin (then the holder of the National Gallery Travelling Scholarship), Margaret Crombie, Shiela Hawkins, James Flett, Herbert McClintock, and Nutter Buzzacott; and in exhibitions of the Contemporary Group, Melbourne, as its youngest member, with George Bell, Daryl Lindsay, Isabel May Tweddle, Evelyn Syme, Ada May Plante, Arnold Shore, William Frater and Adrian Lawlor from 1932 to 1938; and with the Contemporary Art Society from 1926 to 1956 and concurrently, he worked in commercial art as art director for the advertising firm Paton until 1956, producing work for clients including Pelaco shirts. Independently, he produced linocuts, which conveyed his laconic wit in clever visual puns, including bookplates and many Christmas cards he produced for friends, numbers of which are held now in national collections.

Thake was a war artist enlisted as a Flying officer in the Royal Australian Air Force (Service Number 145552) between 24 Nov 1943 and 28 Mar 1946, the second such R.A.A.F combatant artist commissioned during World War II and his two tours of duty covered Port Moresby, Noemfoor Island, Morotai, Alice Springs, Darwin and Koepang. During that time he produced Surrealist works as one of the first working in that style in Australia, alongside James Gleeson with whom he shared 1931 the Contemporary Art Society prize. His 1942 oil painting Brownout sold in 2010 for $228,000.

Thake's first solo exhibition was held after the war at Georges Gallery, Melbourne, in 1947.

After the War Thake returned to Paton and was featured in advertising by a major client as No. 5 in Shell's "Australian Artists" Series, with a depiction of their refinery in Clyde. By 1960 his work included illustrations for the Australian quarterly Manuscripts, design works included the Australian Pavilion at the Wellington Centennial Exhibition in New Zealand that opened on 8 November 1939 at the outset of the Second World War, covers for the literary journal Meanjin, designs for stamps, and concise medical diagrams he produced in the course of his employment from 1956 in the University of Melbourne’s Visual Aids Department where he remained until his retirement.

== Reception ==
Thake's work started being reviewed from June 1930 when he was twenty-six and had started exhibiting with the group calling themselves 'The Embryos.' Reviewing their show at The Little Gallery in Melbourne The Age notes that "Eric Thake follows up the new wood engraving movement, and... also shows a clever two-block lino print, Returned Empty and a decorative lunette design in color." While The Australasian merely noted that his fan design was "very clever," reviewer for The Herald, Blamire Young, singled Thake out for particular attention for his "power of design";

It is surprising that Eric Thake, whose power of design has been so universally recognised has not secured more patrons. Probably the reason is that his point of view is more difficult to grasp than that of his comrades. One feels that his artistic horizon is wider, his mentality more complex, and his sense of color and arrangement more exotic than we are accustomed to find in Australian artists.

The Bulletin described his Across the Paddocks shown in the Victorian Arts and Crafts the Melbourne Town Hall in October 1930 as "a color cut of mushrooms that look as solid as tree stumps," while Arthur Streeton in The Argus, in associating Thake's with Margaret Preston's prints, wrote deprecatingly that "they strike a different note, and... may have their admirers." In a 1933 edition of Art in Australia, George Bell devoted an article to Thake, accompanied by examples of Thake's linocuts, painting and bookplates, in which he praises in his drawing a "definite interest in form in its best sense" that benefitted from his commercial training which required formulating his thoughts and working with intention:

He was so interested in drawing that he did not seem anxious to try the more emotional expression of oil paint. He was engrossed in the pursuit of formal qualities. His definite attitude was of great service to him in his use of oil paint. A thoughtful deliberation although seemingly slow ensured his result and his study was more complete than those of the more impetuous students at the end of the sitting.

== Legacy ==
McCulloch notes that "his sensitivity towards the dispossession of Aboriginal people in his works in particular has been brought to light since his death, and there has been a growing interest in his wonderful Christmas card linocuts, produced from 1941 to 1975."

The National Gallery of Victoria held a retrospective of his work 15 May–4 July 1970, as did Geelong Art Gallery in 2005 and over 2026–2027, with a major catalogue for the latter.

== Exhibitions ==
=== Solo ===
- 1947: Georges Gallery, Melbourne
- 1970, 21 May–4 July: Eric Thake: A Retrospective Exhibition. National Gallery of Victoria
- 1981: Pubs and Bars, Geelong Art Gallery
- 1981: Retrospective exhibition, Victorian Ministry for the Arts Gallery

=== Group ===
- 1929, 6–20 May: Society of Artists' Special Exhibition. David Jones' Art Gallery, 7th floor (Mezzanine), Elizabeth Street, Sydney
- 1929, 7 September–4 October: Society of Artists' Annual Exhibition. Education Department Gallery, 5th floor, Loftus St., Sydney
- 1930, 5 September–2 October: Society of Artists' Annual Exhibition. Education Department Gallery, 5th floor, Loftus St., Sydney
- 1930, 1–12 July: The Embryos, opened by Bernard Heinze. The Little Gallery, 172 Little Collins Street, Melbourne.
- 1930, October: Victorian Arts and Crafts. Melbourne Town Hall
- 1935, Contemporary Art Group, Athenaeum, Melbourne
- 1935, November: Contemporary Art with Mary Cecil Allen, Lady Barrett, George Bell, Rupert Bunny, Mrs. Casey (wife of the Commonwealth Treasurer), William Frater, Adrian Lawlor, Lionel Lindsay, Daryl Lindsay, Ada May Plante, Arnold Shore, Eric Thake, Louise Thomas, and Jessie C. Traill. Geelong Grammar
- 1935, September: with Kate Van Sommers and Adrian Lawlor. Collegiate Galleries, 357 Little Collins St., Melbourne
- 1946, June: R.A.A.F. Paintings. National Gallery of Victoria
- 1978: Survey of Australian Relief Prints 1900–1950, Deutscher Gallery

=== Selected posthumous ===
==== Solo ====
- 2005: Retrospective. Geelong Art Gallery
- 2026/27,14 November–8 March: Do You See What I See? retrospective survey curated by Alisa Bunbury and Kirsty Grant. Geelong Gallery

==== Group ====
- 1988-9: The Great Australian Art Exhibition, Art Gallery of South Australia travelling exhibition, Queensland Art Gallery [2]. (17 May 1988 – 17 July 1988); Art Gallery of Western Australia. (13 August 1988 – 25 September 1988); Art Gallery Of South Australia. (23 May 1989 – 16 July 1989)
- 1992: Classical Modernism: The George Bell Circle, National Gallery of Victoria
- 1995, 5–22 April: Eric Thake Drawings, Linocuts and Photographs. Lyall Burton Gallery 309 Gore Street Fitzroy
- 2000-02: Federation: Australian Art and Society, National Gallery of Australia and touring
- 2002: Christmas Greetings from Thake's Flat, IPMA
- 2003: Australian Surrealism: The Agapitos/Wilson Collection, Art Gallery of Western Australia
- 2005: Bookplates from the Corrigan Collection, Bendigo Art Gallery
- 2005, to 8 July: Linocuts, drawings and photographs. Bridget McDonnell Gallery, 130 Faraday Street, Carlton

== Awards ==
- 1931: Honorable Mention, Los Angeles Bookplate Exhibition, USA
- 1931: Contemporary Art Society prize (shared with James Gleeson)
- 1941: Geelong Art Gallery Frank Evan Richardson Prize for watercolour
- 1940: Contemporary Art Society prize, jointly awarded by Gino Nibbi to Thake and James Gleeson
- 1947: Yorick Club prize
- 1956; Cato Prize, VAS

== Collections ==
- National Gallery of Australia
- Art Gallery of New South Wales
- Art Gallery of South Australia
- Art Gallery of Western Australia
- National Gallery of Victoria
- Queensland Art Gallery
- Tasmanian Museum and Art Gallery
- Australian War Memorial
- State Library of Victoria
- State Library of New South Wales
- Art Gallery of Ballarat
- Bendigo Art Gallery
- Castlemaine Art Museum
- Geelong Art Gallery
- Horsham Regional Art Gallery
- Mornington Peninsular Regional Gallery
- Newcastle Art Gallery
- Deakin University
- La Trobe University
- University of Adelaide Library
- University of Melbourne

== Bibliography ==
- Barnett, P. Neville (1932). Souvenir of "Armorial book-plates". Sydney: Beacon press. OCLC 21104274.
- Croll, Robert Henderson (1942). Checklist of the bookplates of Eric Thake. Australian Bookplate Club, no. 2. OCLC 2883386.
- Thake, Eric (1970). Eric Thake: a retrospective exhibition May 21-July 4, 1970 (Exhibition catalogue ed.). Melbourne, Vic.: National Gallery of Victoria. OCLC 83858765.
- Rich, Margaret; Thake, Eric (1976). Eric Thake pubs & bars. Geelong, Vic.: Geelong Art Gallery. ISBN 9780959675009.
- Thake, Eric (1978). The Christmas linocuts of Eric Thake, 1941-1975. Croft Press. Melbourne: Croft Press. ISBN 978-0-9595992-0-6. OCLC 27627925.
- Thake, Eric; Summons, Elizabeth (1978). The Eric Thake picture book. Toorak, Vic: Gryphon Books. ISBN 978-0-908131-12-9.
- Thake, Eric; Summons, Elizabeth (1982). An individual view: photographs. London: Gryphon Books. ISBN 978-0-908131-28-0. OCLC 19478266.
- Pinson, Peter (1991). Eric Thake, war artist (1st ed.). East Sydney: Institute of Contemporary Art. ISBN 9780949555014.
- Wilkins, Lola; Australia War Memorial (2003). Artists in action : from the collection of the Australian War Memorial. Fishermans Bend, Victoria: Thames and Hudson. ISBN 9780642502643.
- Heywood, Warwick (2014). Reality in flames : modern Australian art & the Second World War. Canberra, ACT: Australian War Memorial. ISBN 9781921353178.
