= Mary Cecil Allen =

Australian artist, writer (1893–1962)

Cecil Allen
- "Portrait of Mary Cecil Allen"; Photo taken in the 1920s
- Born: Mary Cecil Allen; 2 September 1893; Melbourne, Victoria, Australia
- Died: 7 April 1962 (aged 68); Provincetown, Massachusetts, United States
- Resting place: Provincetown Cemetery
- Education: National Gallery of Victoria Art School
- Notable work: Sea, Studio: Winter, Sorento Hotel
- Style: Cubism

Mary Cecil Allen (2 September 1893 – 7 April 1962) was an Australian artist, writer and lecturer. She lived most of her adult life in America, where she was known as Cecil Allen. Allen initially painted landscapes and portraits in her early career, but changed to modernist styles including cubism from the 1930s. In 1927 Allen lectured at New York City venues including the Metropolitan Museum, Columbia University, and other institutions. She was sponsored by the Carnegie Corporation. Allen wrote two books of art criticism, The Mirror of the Passing World (1928) and Painters of the Modern Mind (1929), based on her lectures.

In 1930 Allen curated the first exhibition of Australian art in New York, First Contemporary All-Australian Art Exhibition, at the Roerich Museum. During her lectures and talks in Australia, she helped introduce the ideas of modernism to Melbourne women and artists. After living in New York, from 1949 Allen lived in Provincetown at its art colony. Her cubist style painting, Sea, Studio: Winter, was presented in that year. She died in 1962, at the colony, from "sinus arrest, cause unknown" (see sinoatrial arrest).

== Early life and training ==
Allen was the daughter of Harry Brookes Allen (1854–1926), a pathologist and medical administrator, and Ada Rosalie Elizabeth, née Mason (1862–1933), a community worker. She and her sisters, Edith Margaret and Beatrice (Biddy), spent their childhood living in a staff house at the University of Melbourne where their father was an anatomy professor and the Dean of Medicine. Her father was knighted in 1914. Allen qualified to study a Bachelor of Arts at the University of Melbourne, but decided to study under Fred McCubbin at the National Gallery of Victoria Art School instead, entering the faculty of arts in 1910. From 1912 to 1913 Allen studied at the Slade School of Fine Art when she and her family moved to England. She returned to NGV Art School during 1913–17.

== Early work: 1920s ==
Allen was a member of Australian Art Association, the Victorian Artists' Society and the Twenty Melbourne Painters during the 1920s and her exhibitions of landscapes and portrait paintings were well received by the Melbourne art world. She was also a member of society, being friends with Ivy Brookes (daughter of Alfred Deakin) and having Dame Nellie Melba and University Vice-Chancellor Sir John Grice open some of her exhibitions. Two of Allen's portraits were finalists in the Archibald Prize in 1921 and a further two were finalists in 1925. During early September 1921 Allen exhibited a set of fifty-four oil paintings at the Fine Art Society's Gallery in Melbourne. In 1925 Allen became the first woman art critic for The Sun. She studied under Max Meldrum, a tonal impressionist whose students, Arnold Shore and Jock Frater, had been experimenting with modernism. At this point, Allen was not yet a fan of modernism — she criticised Shore's work in The Sun and said that post-impressionists "create nothing but monsters–they invent the abnormal" during one of her lectures. In 1926 she was employed by the National Gallery of Victoria as an art guide and lecturer — the first woman to hold this position and as a professional painter was admitted as a member of the Australian Art Association.

In 1926, Florence Gillies, an American tourist, visited Melbourne and invited Allen to be her guide through European galleries, mostly in Paris. Following this, in 1927, Allen lectured at New York City venues including the Metropolitan Museum, Columbia University and other institutions. She ran a series of lectures at the Readers Roundtable of the People's Institute, held at the New York Public Library, where newly created adult classes were taking place and were sponsored by the Carnegie Corporation. From that time, Allen generally lived and worked in New York. According to Marion Scott "[Allen] was able to increase one's ability to comprehend visually what had previously been puzzling... She did this by using words with great economy, words which were so lucid that they created no barrier between one's eyes and the work of Art."

== Modernism: 1930s ==
Following her work and travels in Europe and America, Allen converted to modernism. She wrote two books, The Mirror of the Passing World (1928) and Painters of the Modern Mind (1929) based on her lectures and in the latter book, stated "that art should convey ideas, rather than mimic visual reality".

In 1930 Allen organised the first exhibition of Australian artists in New York, "First Contemporary All-Australian Art Exhibition", at the Nicholas Roerich Museum, opening in February 1931. Besides her own work, featured artists included Norman Lindsay, Thea Proctor, George Bell and Dora Toovey: and one hundred paintings were shown. The cover of the exhibition catalogue had the Commonwealth coat of arms and a notice of patronage by Prime Minister James Scullin. Herbert Brookes, husband of Allen's friend Ivy, had been the Commissioner General for Australia in the United States from 1929 to 1930 and had approved the official stamp on the exhibition catalogue, adding the newly elected prime minister's name as his representative in New York.

The exhibition attracted large attendances and interest, and then Allen lectured on the works during its tour. La Revue Moderne, a French modern art journal, profiled her in 1931. The New York Times called her work in the Australian Art exhibition "arrestingly modern" — this was in contrast to the conservative works of other Australian artists. In a later interview with The Advertiser, on 17 June 1936, Allen mentioned all the art work exhibited had non-Australian scenery and had titles such as "Landscape in Spain" and "Bosky Dells in Surrey". She elaborated, "If I had come upon as much as a single kangaroo I would have hailed it with delight".

Chanin notes that during 1935 Allen's work was shown at the Brooklyn Museum International Exhibition, the New York Independents Exhibition, the Salon of American Art and the 38th Annual New Jersey State Exhibition, beside that of Milton Avery, Stanley William Hayter and William Zorach. Allen returned to Melbourne that year for eleven months. She spoke with many women's groups whilst in Australia, such as National Council of Women of Victoria and Australian Federation of University Women. Receptions were hosted for her by the Victoria League Club, the Arts and Crafts Society of Victoria, the International Club and the Melbourne Society of Women Painters. At the party hosted for her in October 1935 at the Athenaeum Gallery by the Melbourne Society of Women Painters, she spoke of the differences between female painters in New York and Australia, "In New York there is a big gallery specially for women, which has solved a great difficulty." She noted that the history of female painters was sparse: "We must look to the future because women in art have no past." Basil Burdett wrote that during this time in Melbourne, Allen "exercised a profound influence in favour of the new forms, both by teaching and lecturing".

Allen's paintings — including abstracted depictions of New York skyscrapers and subways — were exhibited at the Fine Art Society's Gallery between 20 and 31 August 1935. They "aroused a storm of protest", according to Frankie Derham, her friend, fellow artist and art educator; "with only loyal friends buying pictures, which they later confessed they dare not hang at home". Despite the controversy — the distortion in the works was considered a lack of realism and "loss in skill" — the exhibition was a success, and conversation piece, drawing crowds until its closure.

Allen introduced the American tradition of the weekend sketching school to students in Melbourne. She also lectured at the Bell-Shore School on the invitation of Arnold Shore, The Argus' art critic, who had been a fellow student. She spoke about balance, colour harmony, equal attention to positive and negative space — "the air should be as positive as a cube of ice" — and encouraged a cubist approach, as it "is the only way in which to grasp the essential forms of nature." When analysing the function of the grotesque in modern art, Allen wrote in 1930, "All that is strange and incredible and non-existent is its subject matter. It takes what is not and what might be and creates with them and opposes this new imaginative world to the positive world of naturalism and science."

== Provincetown Art Colony: 1950s ==
From 1949 Allen lived and worked in Provincetown at its art colony. Her cubist style painting, "Sea, studio: Winter" was painted in that year at the colony. It was shown at Georges Gallery in Melbourne in following year. In June 1950 Allen travelled to Alice Springs to "capture something of the strange character and beauty of central Australia for an exhibition when she returns next month to New York." From this trip she wrote "Notes on Central Australia" for Meanjin, the Australian literary magazine, in Spring 1950.

Her final visit to Australia was from November 1959 to April 1960, to lecture and exhibit. The Age's art critic wrote, "[Allen]'s capabilities are most apparent when she is occupied with the rearrangement of planes and forms, and their disposition as a pictorial unity... This ability is illustrated by the near-abstract compositions [including] 'Sea, studio...' [in which] the suggestion of space in design is admirable".

== Death and legacy ==
Mary Cecil Allen died on 7 April 1962, she was found dead in her chair by neighbours, due to "sinus arrest, cause unknown" (see sinoatrial arrest). She was buried at the Provincetown Cemetery, according to Anglican rites.

Eight of Allen's paintings are held by the National Gallery of Victoria. Her papers are held at the Archives of American Art. Sacrifice, a wax crayon work, was sold at Christie's (London), in November 1991, for USD1,096. Her landscape, Sorento Hotel, was sold at auction in May 2001, in Melbourne, for US$7,274.

In 1963 the Art Teachers Association of Victoria established the Mary Cecil Allen Memorial Lecture delivered annually, where an international speaker alternated with an Australian speaker over successive years. In July 1966 L. M. Haynes, professor of industrial arts at the University of Sydney delivered "Creativity in Art and Science" for that year's lecture.

== Publications ==
- Allen, Mary Cecil (1928), P. N. Youtz (ed.), The Mirror of the Passing World, Outline of Aesthetics, W. W. Norton; University of California
- Allen, Mary Cecil (1929), Painters of the Modern Mind (1st ed.), New York: W. W. Norton and Company
- Allen, Mary Cecil (April 1934). "Melbourne". Canadian Geographic Journal. 8 (4): 183–196. ISSN 0706-2168.
- Allen, Mary Cecil (Spring 1950). "Notes on Central Australia". Meanjin. 9 (3). Melbourne University Press: 191–192. ISSN 1324-1745.

== Selected paintings ==
- In Fancy Dress (65 by 92 centimetres (26 in × 36 in), 1918)
- In Fancy Dress (85 by 92 centimetres (33 in × 36 in), 1918)
- Portrait (1921)
- Portrait (1921)
- Mrs R. D. Elliott (1925)
- Miss Alice Guest (1925)
- Sketch: Miss Audrey Stevenson as Circe (1930)
- Reclining blue figure (1930s)
- Back gardens (1935)
- Nova Scotian fisherman (1935)
- Old mill stairs, Nantucket (1949)
- Sea, studio: Winter (1949)
- Manhattan (1950s)
- Abstract Figure Composition (1959)
- Fisherman at the nets (1959)
- Eildon Weir, dusk (1960)
- Near Yan Yean Victoria (1960)
- Storm approaching Eildon Weir (1960)
- Sacrifice (undated)
- Seated girl with headband (undated)
- Sorento Hotel (undated)
- Wind walking (undated)
