= Jack Courier =

Australian Modernist printmaker, painter, & teacher (1915–2007)

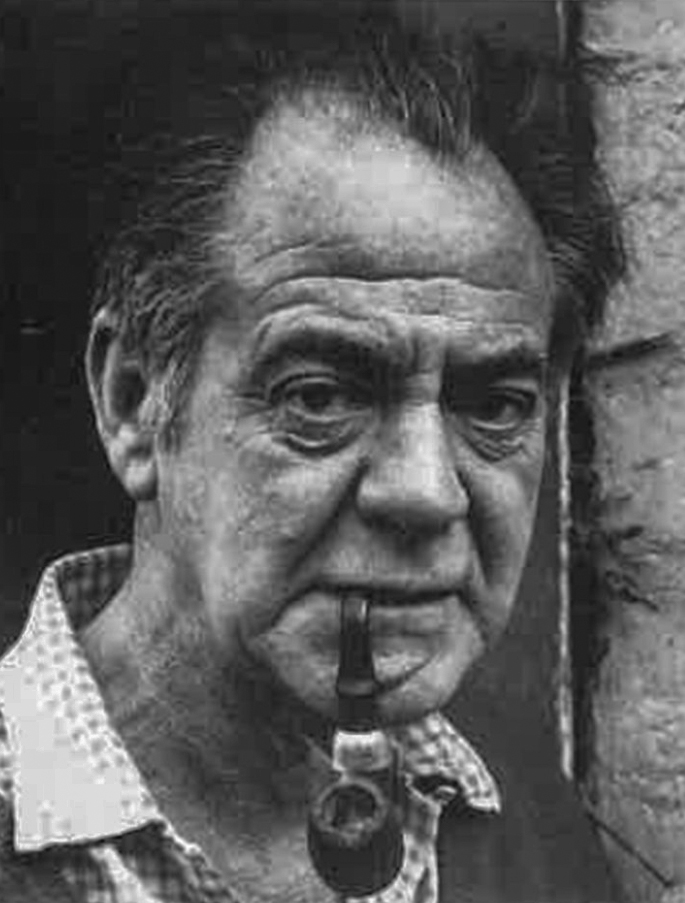
Jack Courier (c.1955)

Jack Courier (1915–2007), also known as John Courier, was an Australian Modernist printmaker, painter and teacher.

== Early life and education ==
Courier was born in 1915 in Elwood, Victoria. As a young man he took various jobs including work as a salesman in country towns.

He studied at the school established by George Bell and Arnold Shore at 443 Bourke Street, Melbourne, which became a centre for modernist art in Melbourne. He exhibited with the George Bell Group in 1949 and with the Melbourne Contemporary Artists in 1952. An early review by The Age art critic of the exhibition of the George Bell Group in their annual exhibition at the Victorian Artists' Society's Gallery in Albert Street, East Melbourne, noted that Courier's painting The Red Chair and a Peter Cox painting, were works "by younger men that impress".

== Career ==
Like other Australian printmakers, including Fred Williams, Ian Armstrong, Janet Dawson and Robert Grieve, Courier went to study abroad. From 1950 to 1951 he travelled in Europe, then, funded by a British Council Bursary, returned to England from 1954 to 1956 to study painting, drawing and lithography with Lynton Lamb and Ceri Richards, and also etching at the Slade School. On his return to Melbourne, he set up the first printmaking department at Prahran Technical School. Not long after his return, he exhibited paintings, drawings and lithographs made in London at Peter Bray Gallery in March 1957. The Age art critic wrote of "the newcomer" as:

"An artist of Integrity and personal feeling. Working in the subdued English light he has evolved a low-toned, misty style in his oils, which leaves him little tonal range. But within the limits he allows himself he can create an effect of depth and space which enriches his quiet canvases [...] The color is deliberately unobtrusive, but it Is an organic part of these works," going on to remark on his skilful draughtsmanship to conclude that "he is almost certainly an artist to watch."

The conservative magazine The Bulletin wryly commented;

"Jack Courier is a Melbourne artist who went to London and more-or-less starved there while he studied at the Slade School. He emerged therefrom with a technical equipment sufficient to enable him to produce lithographs and drawings of bits of old London with a line which is often heavy and unfeeling, but sometimes light and expressive. His oils have an elusive quality about them as if painted in the twilight."

His friend and colleague Peter Jacobs organised the acquisition of Courier’s works by the National Gallery of Australia, where Roger Butler, a senior curator remarked that "Jack is arguably Australia’s finest stone lithographer..."

== Teaching ==
Courier taught at Caulfield Technical College, where he introduced the teaching of lithography; at Prahran College and Swinburne Technical College. He also taught silk screening and drawing at Pentridge Gaol.

Courier was a founding member of the Print Council of Australia and exhibited with them, including in touring shows.

== Personal life ==
Later in life Courier married painter Mary McLeish, a member of the Women Painters and Sculptors Society. The couple exhibited together and she was frequently a finalist in the Archibald Prize. Mary's daughter was Barbara Courier McLeish (born 1936).

== Exhibitions ==
=== Solo ===
- 1957, 19–28 March: Peter Bray Gallery
- 1966, from 30 January: Exhibition of paintings and prints by Jack Courier. North Adelaide Galleries
- 1991, 28 November – 18 December: Eastgate Gallery
- 2009: Castlemaine Art Gallery and Historical Museum
- 1963, May: Landscapes. Concurrent with solo show by wife Mary McLeish. Australian Galleries, Collingwood
- 1989: Jack Courier, lithographs and oils. Eastgate Gallery
- 2003: Lithographs and gouaches by Jack Courier. The Rotunda, Hong Kong

=== Group ===
- 1952, Melbourne Contemporary Artists annual exhibition. Victorian Artists Society, East Melbourne
- 1992: Classical Modernism: The George Bell Circle. National Gallery of Victoria
- 1970, March: Leveson Street Gallery, North Melbourne

== Collections ==
- National Gallery of Australia
- Art Gallery of New South Wales
- Art Gallery of South Australia
- National Gallery of Victoria
- Castlemaine Art Museum
- Latrobe Valley
- Mildura
- Warrnambool

== Awards ==
1975: Alice Springs Prize (print acquired)
