= George Bell (painter) =

Australian painter and teacher

George Bell OBE
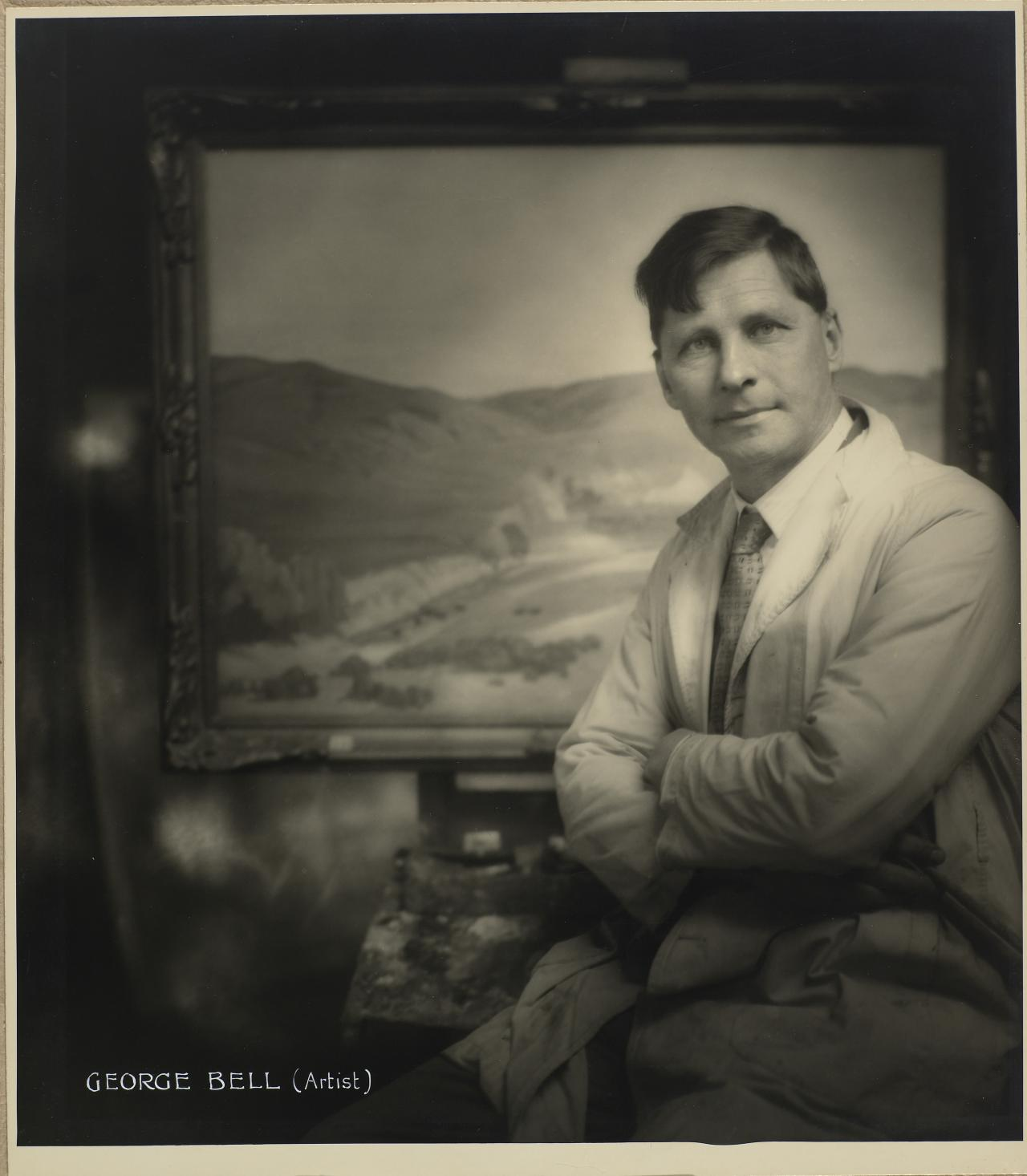
- George Bell in 1932 photographed by Jack Cato
- Born: George Frederick Henry Bell; 1 December 1878; Kew, Victoria, Australia
- Died: 22 October 1966 (aged 87); Toorak, Victoria, Australia
- Education: Kew High School
- Alma mater: National Gallery of Victoria Art School
- Occupations: Painter; portraitist; teacher; art critic; violinist

George Frederick Henry Bell OBE (1 December 1878 – 22 October 1966) was an Australian painter and teacher, critic, portraitist, violinist and war artist who contributed significantly to the advancement of the local Modern movement from the 1920s to the 1930s.

== Early life and education ==
George Bell was born in Kew, Victoria, the son and fourth child of Clara (née Bowler) and George Bell, public servant, and was educated at Kew High School. He studied at the National Gallery of Victoria Art School from 1896 to 1903 under Frederick McCubbin and painting master Bernard Hall and also took private instruction from George Coates over 1895-6.

== Europe ==
Bell's father financed his studies so he could afford to travel, and on 19 April 1904 he sailed for England, then Paris where studied with Jean Paul Laurens at Julian's atelier, then at the academies of the Spaniard Castelucha and Colarossi.

In 1906 he travelled to Italy to study the Old Masters, particularly Titian and Tintoretto, before visiting the Impressionist artists’ colonies at Étaples, and St Ives in 1907. That year he became a founder of the Modern Society of Portrait Painters in London where he later exhibited in 1915. Importantly, in 1908 he was accepted into the Royal Academy and joined the Chelsea Arts Club, mixing with Australian expatriates Will Ashton, Fred Leist, George Coates, Dora Meeson, Will Dyson and his wife Ruby Lindsay, and British artists George Lambert and Philip Connard.

== War years ==
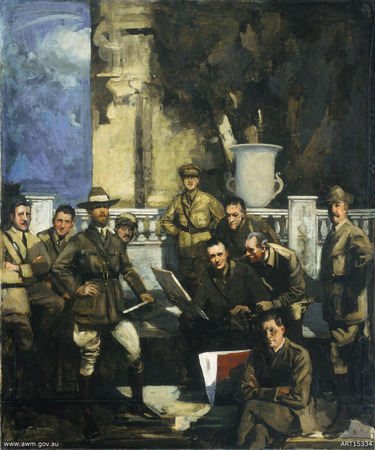
Portrait of Australian official war artists, 1916–1918 by George Coates, 1920. George Bell is seated in front

Bell remained in England at the outset of World War I, and being declared medically unfit, he taught at Highfield School in Liphook, and during 1917 worked in a munitions factory. From October 1918 to the end of 1919 he was an official war artist to the 4th Division of the Australian Imperial Force on the Western Front though combat had ceased when he arrived, so he documented scenes of the devastation, and the daily lives of soldiers, of whom he made twelve portraits. Bell's major war painting concerning the Battle of Hamel, Dawn at Hamel 4 July 1918, was completed in 1920, after his return to Australia in poor health in December 1919, and the work now hangs in the Australian War Memorial.

The Ballarat Fine Art Gallery collection includes his work entitled The Conversation. One of his early formal paintings, The Conversation was painted while he was overseas and was first exhibited at the Modern Society of Portrait Painters in 1911.

== Postwar ==
Bell married English actress Edith Lucy Antoinette Hobbs, whom he had met in England in 1915. They had a house and studio built for them by Bell's cousin Marcus Barlow; 9 Selbourne Road Toorak remained his lifelong home and there the couple entertained often and artists including Will Dyson and Eric Thake visited to sketch. The couple's only child Antoinette was born in December 1922. Bell had also studied violin with Victor and Alberto Zelman, joined the Hawthorn Orchestra, and during the 1920s played the viola in the University Conservatorium Orchestra and later the Melbourne Symphony Orchestra. He involved himself eagerly in the community of artists, being elected to the council of the Victorian Artists’ Society, was a founder of the Twenty Melbourne Painters and in 1922 joined the Australian Art Association, serving as president between 1924 and 1926. One of a number of Australian art critics for news periodicals that proliferated in the mid 20th century, he contributed for The Sun News-Pictorial from 1923 to 1950. In 1925 he replaced the National Gallery School drawing master William McInnes while he was overseas. He continued in a Tonalist style though was increasingly attracted to Modernism by the 1930s.

== Teaching ==
George Bell gave classes for students including Eric Thake, Clive Stephen, Sybil Craig and Madge Freeman at his house in Selborne Rd, Toorak from 1922. Ten years later, as well as still giving some private lessons at his home in Toorak, he and Arnold Shore opened the Bell-Shore School at 443 Bourke Street, Melbourne, which became a centre of modern art in Melbourne. Their students over the years included Russell Drysdale, Sali Herman, Bill Salmon, Peter Purves Smith, Yvonne Atkinson, Frances Derham, Geoff Jones and Alan Sumner.

In his teaching Bell adapted from the tradition of Raphael, whose art teaching elevated life drawing and the study of composition, by incorporating contemporary ideas of the 1820s English theorists Roger Fry and Clive Bell, the contemporary French artists André Lhote and Amédée Ozenfant and, after he undertook an extended study trip to England in 1934-5, particularly the Ideas of his friend Iain MacNab, a minor British modernist, with whom he travelled to Spain with in 1935. He visited the Tate galleries and the New English Art Club.

When Bell returned from Europe, Shore departed their partnership in 1936. Having assimilated Post-Impressionism, particularly the spatial experiments of Cezanne, and new approaches to painting in England he innovated approaches in his own work to form, spatial construction and modelling through conscientious drawing.

Bell continued teaching at the school until 1939 when it was relocated once again to his house. Students in this later period included Ian Armstrong, Barbara Brash, Rod Clarke, Jack Courier, Justin Gill, Leonard French, Mary Macqueen, Anne Montgomery, Guelda Pyke, Harry Rosengrave, Rosemary Ryan, Dorothy and Clive Stephen, David Strachan and Fred Williams.

Adrian Lawlor, Vic O'Connor, Albert Tucker, Sam Atyeo, William Frater, Isabel Tweddle, Mary Cecil Allen, Moya Dyring, Danila Vassilieff, Lina Bryans and Basil Burdett frequented the school as associates or casual students.

Bell taught his students that creativity and ideas can only be articulated coherently through technique, which might be acquired only through effort and perseverance. His teaching over forty years was influential and it is that for which he is best remembered.

== Modern art controversy ==
In protest at the government sponsored conservatism of Australian art, on 13 July 1932, Bell established the Contemporary Art Society as founding president 1938–1940. In 1937, the federal Attorney General, Robert Menzies, established the Australian Academy of Art, an Australian equivalent to the Royal Academy. Bell was the leading opponent of the plan and a spokesman for "modern art", pursued a prolonged public argument with Menzies and was instrumental in it not obtaining a royal charter. That year Bell brought an exhibition of fifty-two works of modern art by artists outside Australia, including paintings by van Gogh and also a Picasso, to the National Gallery of Victoria between October and November.

The Contemporary Art Society's first exhibition was also at the National Gallery of Victoria, in June 1939, and included work from all states, but after internal disagreements Bell, with 38 members, seceded in 1940. John Reed revived the Society in 1954, and in 1956 established the Gallery of Contemporary Art, which became the Museum of Modern Art Australia in 1958.

In 1941 Bell organised another group, the Melbourne Contemporary Artists, and then in 1949 he created the George Bell group, both successful because of his influence in Australian art and respect amongst its community. Its members were; Eric Thake, Alan Sumner, Yvonne Atkinson, Geoff Jones, Jack Courier, Justin Gill, Sali Herman, Ian Armstrong, Fred Williams, Harry Rosengrave, Len French, Constance Stokes, Russell Drysdale.

== Exhibitions ==
Bell established his reputation in England in a series of exhibitions before the First World War. The Ballarat Fine Art Gallery collection includes his work entitled The Conversation. One of his early formal paintings, The Conversation was painted while he was overseas and was first exhibited at the Modern Society of Portrait Painters in 1911.

- 1908: Allied Artists Association
- 1908: Walker Art Gallery, Liverpool
- 1909: Allied Artists Association
- 1911: Modern Society of Portrait Painters
- 1911: The Salon
- 1913: Walker Art Gallery, Liverpool
- 1913: The Salon
- 1913: The Royal Institute Of Portrait Painters
- 1914: New English Art Club

Returning to Australia Bell initiated and participated in the exhibitions of the George Bell Group and of the Melbourne Contemporary Art Society, and of his work in a March 1956 showing of the latter, The Age art critic remarked "George Bell is undoubtedly the most brilliant draftsman of the group. His two drawings, executed with complete control, are monumental in form."

- 1931, 27 April – 10 May: Annual Autumn exhibition. Victorian Artists' Society Gallery, Melbourne1935, from 1 November: Exhibition of contemporary art. Geelong Grammar Art Gallery, Geelong Grammar, Geelong
- 1946, from 4 June: Contemporary drawings. Myer Gallery, Melbourne
- 1950, 23 May – 2 June: Tenth anniversary 1940 – 1950. Tye's Art Gallery, Rear Tyre's Furniture store, Bourke St., Melbourne
- 1953, 12–23 December: Herald outdoor art show. Treasury Gardens, Melbourne

=== Posthumous ===
- 1978, 13 April – 5 May: A Survey of Australian Relief Prints 1900 – 1950. Deutscher Galleries 1092 High Street, Armidale, MelbournePosthumous exhibitions include Bell in surveys of Australian art. In particular
- 1979: George Bell retrospective exhibition. University Of Melbourne Art Gallery
- 1979, 10 – 25 May: Early works and others selected from the Harry Rosengrave Collection. Hawthorn City Art Gallery, 584 Glenferrie Rd., Hawthorn
- 1981: Melbourne woodcuts and linocuts of the 1920's and 1930s. McClelland Gallery, Boundary Rd., Langwarrin; UQ Art Gallery, Level 5, Forgan Smith Tower, University of Queensland, St Lucia; Newcastle Region Art Gallery, Laman Street, Newcastle; Victorian College Of The Arts Gallery, 234 St Kilda Rd., Melbourne; Ballarat Fine Art Gallery, 40 Lydiard St., Ballarat, Victoria, Australia
- 1983, 8 – 24 June: Images of Women Prints and Drawings of the Twentieth Century. University Of Melbourne Art Gallery.
- 1986: Frances Derham MBE: a retrospective exhibition covering the period 1910 to 1985 including works George Bell, Danila Vassilieff, Geoff Jones, Ethel Spowers, Ludwig Hirschfeld-Mack. Jim Alexander Gallery, 13 Elmo Road, East Malvern
- 1988, 13 August – 10 September: Fifty Years of Australian Printmaking Sydney Long to Eric Thake. Josef Lebovic Gallery, 34 Paddington Street, Paddington, Sydney
- 1991, 17–28 April: The George Bell Group exhibition. A tribute to George Bell. Eastgate Gallery, 729 High St., Armadale, Victoria
- 2025, 16 March–28 September: A modern turn. Castlemaine Art Museum

== Collections ==
- Australian War Memorial
- National Gallery of Australia
- Art Gallery of New South Wales
- Art Gallery of Western Australia
- Queensland Art Gallery
- Newcastle Region Art Gallery
- Potter Museum of Art
- Ballarat Art Gallery
- Castlemaine Art Museum

== Legacy ==
Critic and historian Mary Eagle researched the George Bell school for an Honours degree from which the book The George Bell School: students, friends, influences was published in 1981, and which is credited in Felicity Moore's 1992 work Classical modernism : the George Bell circle, a major survey exhibition and publication of at the National Gallery of Victoria in 1992. Works of fellow modernists, friends or those whom he admired, including Arnold Shore, Lina Bryans, Ian Fairweather and Roger Kemp were shown alongside those of his students; Peter Purves Smith, Ian Armstrong, Eric Thake, Barbara Brash; as well as the later work of his students Russell Drysdale, Sali Herman, Bill Salmon, David Strachan, Fred Williams, Dorothy Braund, Michael Shannon and others.

Bell was appointed an Officer of the Order of the British Empire (OBE) in 1966.

He died on 22 October at his home at Toorak in the same year, survived by his wife and daughter.

== Publications about ==
- Williams, Fred. (1979). "Bell, George Frederick Henry (1878–1966)," Australian Dictionary of Biography, Vol. 7. Carlton, Victoria: Melbourne University Press.
- Eagle, Mary; Minchin, Jan (1981). The George Bell School: students, friends, influences. Melbourne; Sydney: Deutscher Art; Resolution Press. ISBN 978-0-908180-05-9. OCLC 780688464.
- Moore, Felicity St. John (1992). Classical modernism : the George Bell circle. George Bell, National Gallery of Victoria. Melbourne: National Gallery of Victoria. ISBN 0-7241-0155-1. OCLC 27548944.

== See also ==
- Australian official war artists
- War artist
- War art
