= Tweedle =

Tweedle may refer to:

- Scientific slang for a preon in particle physics.
- Tweedles (album), by The Residents 2006
- Elizabeth Tweedle (born 1985), retired British artistic gymnast
- Stanley H. Tweedle, major character in sci-fi TV series Lexx
- Tweedle, a single-element monster in My Singing Monsters

== See also ==
- Tweedledum and Tweedledee
- Tweedle Dee, Tweedle Dum (disambiguation)
- Tweedle Dee (disambiguation)
