= Alan Sumner =

Australian post-modernist artist (1911–1994)

Alan Sumner MBE
- 1936 Portrait of Alan Sumner by Albert Tucker
- Born: Alan Robert Melbourne Summer; 10 November 1911; Melbourne, Victoria, Australia
- Died: 20 October 1994 (aged 83); Melbourne, Victoria, Australia
- Education: National Gallery of Victoria Art School; Melbourne Technical College; George Bell School; Académie de la Grande Chaumière; The Courtauld Institute of Art
- Known for: Stained Glass, Painting
- Movement: Post-modern impressionism
- Awards: Member of the Order of the British Empire

Alan Robert Melbourne Sumner MBE (10 November 1911 – 20 October 1994) was an Australian artist; a painter, printmaker, teacher, stained glass designer and WW2 Royal Australian Air Force veteran.

== Education ==
Alan Sumner studied at Melbourne's National Gallery Art School in 1933, at Melbourne Technical College, and from 1933 to 1939 at the George Bell School, then 1950–52 at the Académie de la Grande Chaumière, Paris and the Courtauld Institute, London.

== Career ==
Sumner was apprenticed as a stained-glass designer for the firm of Brooks Robinson, Melbourne then for fifteen years at E.L. Yencken and Co where he was mentored by fellow artist William Frater, becoming head designer. He painted in a post-impressionist style influenced by George Bell, which he applied in his work as a stained glass artist; he was commissioned for around 100 stained glass works, most important of which are the windows for the Services Memorial Chapel, Scots Church, Melbourne, and the memorial window for Charles Joseph La Trobe in Chapelle de l'Ermitage, Neuchatel, Switzerland.

Sumner was early in Australia in adapting, for fine art purposes, screen printing which had been employed for industrial and commercial printing since 1900. He exhibited examples in a solo show Silk screen prints by Alan Sumner which toured Georges Gallery, 162 Collins St., Melbourne, 7–16 May 1946; Finney's Art Gallery, Brisbane 7–23 August 1946; John Martin's Art Gallery, Rundle Mall, Adelaide, 21–31 August 1946; and Margaret Jaye Gallery, Rowe St., Sydney 10–21 September 1946.

== Legacy ==
Very late in life Sumner was recognised in the exhibition Classical Modernism: The George Bell circle at the National Gallery of Victoria in 1992, and the simultaneous exhibition of his screenprints at Eastgate Gallery, Melbourne that demonstrated facility in the medium in which he would use up to 17 screens on the one print.

== Teaching ==
Following service in World War Two, Sumner was appointed assistant instructor in painting at the National Gallery Art School, Melbourne, from 1947 to 1950, and was its first appointment of a modernist artist. He was head of the School from 1953 to 1962. His instruction and personal style was influential on a number of significant Australian artists, Barbara Brash, Dorothy Mary Braund, Stan Ostoja-Kotkowski, Janet Dawson and Ian Lee Burn among them. Nevertheless, Art critic Robert Hughes in 1962 after Sumner's resignation wrote complaining that "since his appointment as the school's head in 1947, Mr Sumner seems to have produced no young painter whose work is of any significance whatever — except Janet Dawson, whose unquestionable talent comes, in part, from a revolt against the flaccid academism Mr Sumner has preached."

== Awards ==
- 1948: Crouch Prize, Ballarat
- 1978: Member of the Order of the British Empire (MBE)
- 1980: Fellow, British Society Master Glass Painters
- 1989: Fellow, Victorian Artists Society (VAS)
- 1990: Medal of Honour, VAS

== Collections ==
- National Gallery of Australia
- Art Gallery of New South Wales
- Art Gallery of South Australia
- National Gallery of Victoria
- Queensland Art Gallery
- Ballarat Fine Art Gallery
