= William Frater =

British-born Australian painter and stained-glass designer

William Frater OBE
- Born: 31 January 1890; Linlithgow, Scotland
- Died: 28 November 1974 (aged 84); Melbourne, Victoria, Australia
- Education: Glasgow School of Art
- Known for: Stained Glass, Painting
- Notable work: The Red Hat, 1937,
- Movement: Modernism
- Awards: Order of the British Empire for his services to art

William Frater OBE (1890–1974) was a Scottish-born Australian stained-glass designer and modernist painter who challenged conservative tastes in Australian art.

== Early life and education ==
=== Scotland ===
William Frater was born on 31 January 1890 at Ochiltree Castle, near Linlithgow in West Lothian in Scotland. His father was forester William Frater (1863–1893) and mother Sarah Boyd (née Manson) a farm servant (1857–1900). After his father died from typhoid, and his mother from gastroenteritis, Frater and his three siblings were brought up by his paternal grandmother Ann and uncle Andrew who lived in neighbouring houses at West Ochiltree Farm. Frater gained his Merit Certificate at Bridgend School, Auldhill Road, West Lothian in 1903, and attended Kingscavil Public School in 1904, then studied art at the Linlithgow Academy in 1905 before taking up a three-year apprenticeship in 1905 in the Oscar Paterson glass studio in Glasgow.

=== Australia ===
Frater won the Glasgow School of Art Haldane Scholarship for drawing in 1906 and studied in the craft and stained glass workshops. However his uncle, fearing a penniless future for his nephew, prevented his entry into the final year to take painting, and Frater left the school 1909, migrating on the liner Norseman to Melbourne in September 1910, a year after his younger brother Tom, who had continued on to Sydney. His application to the National Gallery School of Art was rejected by Bernard Hall (1859–1935), and instead he found employment as overseer of stained-glass design at Brooks, Robinson & Co. Ltd on a five-year contract. He enrolled in the Victorian Artists' Society life class but his behaviour had him ejected. Affronted, he impulsively returned to Britain on the Orama in May 1912 after only five months, and completed his training at Glasgow in the senior painting classes at the School of Art under Maurice Greiffenhagen and Anning Bell.

In July 1913 he returned to Melbourne and in 1915 married tailor Winifred (Winnie) Dow (1888–1974), who had modelled for him before his return to Scotland, and they took up residence in Alphington. They had six children; a stillborn female (1915); Arthur, a manufacturer (1916–1998); John, a carpenter/builder (1920–2004); Barbara Dare, an actor and office worker (1924–2000); and twins, musician William (Bill) (1931–2009) and scientist Robin (1931–2014). Like other red-headed Scots, Frater was nicknamed 'Jock' by friends in his adopted country.

== Career ==
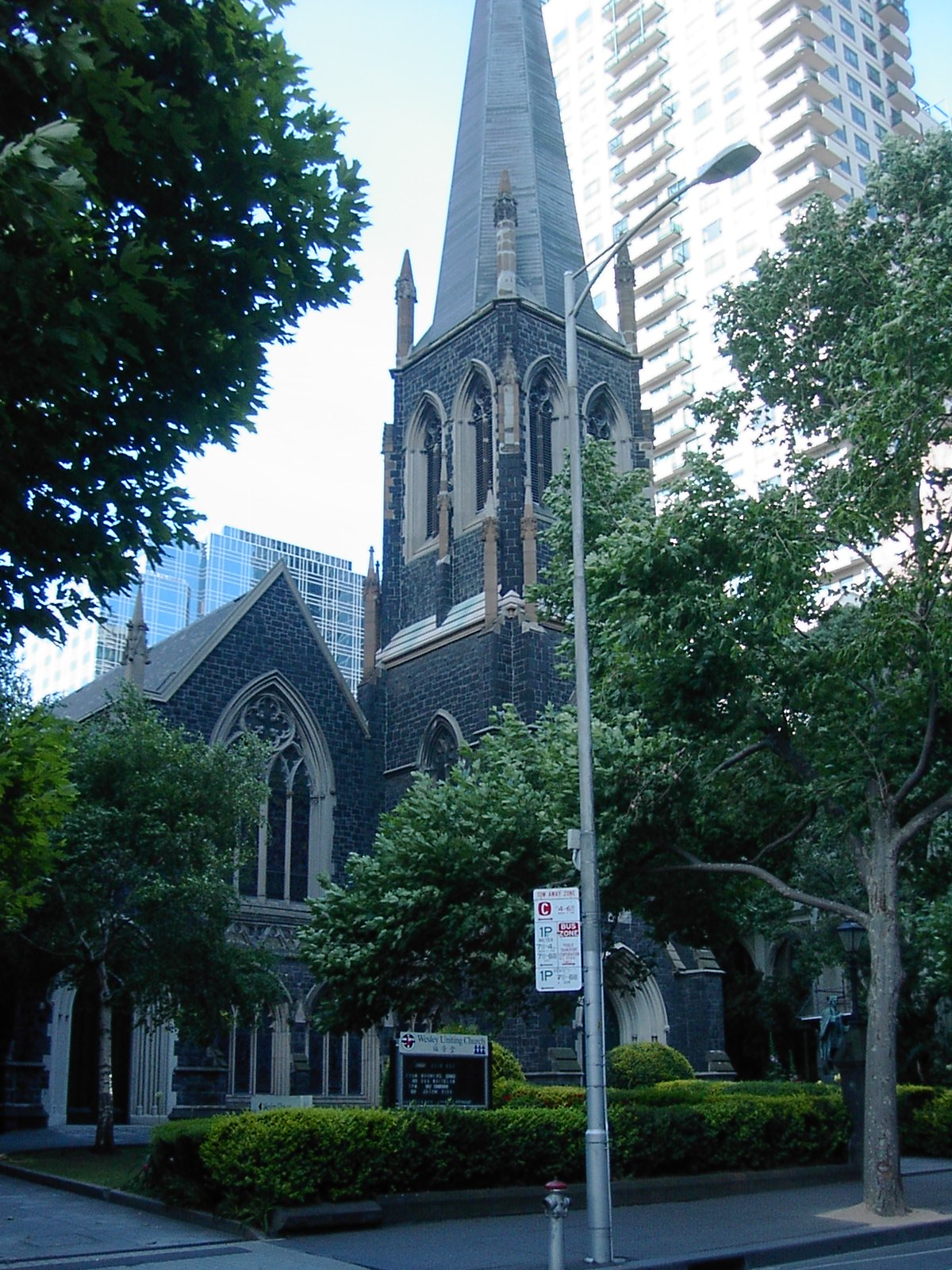
Wesley Church, Melbourne, exterior

=== Stained glass ===
Frater resumed his earlier position with Brooks, Robinson, then was employed by E. L. Yencken & Co. Pty Ltd to design the west window of Wesley Church, Lonsdale Street, Melbourne, which he regarded as his most significant design, and other commissions including windows of Kyabram Wesley Evangelical Methodist Church, St Stephen's Anglican Heritage Church, Wynyard, Tasmania and Birregurra Christ Church. Frater attempted to introduce his Glasgow Arts & Crafts training into his renditions of The Light of the World in the 1930s in glass at Holy Trinity Anglican, Oakleigh and St. Andrew's Presbyterian, Mansfield, but was confined by commercial considerations, so that while recognisable as The Light of the World, they lacked the symbolism of Hunt's painting of the subject and the Arts & Crafts ethos.

At Yencken he mentored teenage apprentice Alan Sumner for fifteen years, encouraging his painting ambitions, and made a lifelong friend in Arnold Shore, also a stained-glass designer, and they continued to paint and exhibit in their spare time.

=== Tonalism ===
Between 1915 and 1920 Frater simplified his composition and design, based on his stained glass experience. For a time in his earlier painting interest in the classical seventeenth century painters interacted with his adoption of the analytical tonalism of Max Meldrum in figure and portrait paintings including The artist's wife reading (1915) and Portrait of artist's wife (1919). In a 1961 interview with Hazel de Berg, Frater recorded his interactions with Meldrum:

Anyhow, I arrived back here...some months before the 1914 war broke out. Max Meldrum had come back here meanwhile, he had been abroad many years in France, and we had terrific arguments. Max would have nothing later than Manet, and the Impressionists he was not at all interested in. Really I think it was through my arguing and discussing with Max that was the beginning of what they called modern art here. Max was so dogmatic...and his conception of tone was just black and white really, and this idea of tone as colour, later in the early twenties, when I became aware of Cézanne, tone became not just light and shade, but tone values had colour values as well, so that was the great discovery, really, that I personally made...

=== Post-impressionism ===
He experimented with Cézannesque modernist colour over the next decade, during which he led and taught a group of Australian modernists, assisting in the modern art school established by George Bell and Frater's lifelong friend Arnold Shore. They made trips to the countryside outside Melbourne on weekends to paint in the plein air tradition of the Barbizon school. With associates Horace Brandt, Pat Harford and Isabel Tweddle, they constituted a post-Impressionist school of painting in Melbourne.

His first solo exhibition was at the Athenaeum, Melbourne in May 1923, and he exhibited there with the Twenty Melbourne Painters from the late 1920s, and the Contemporary Group of Melbourne in the 1930s. In a lecture he publicly challenged the anti-modernist stance that National Gallery School director Bernard Hall had expressed in his previous lecture.

Frater was characterised in a 1933 Art in Australia article as a stereotypical Scot;

...dogged and tenacious, strong in pride of race, reliant and confident in self, a hard man to talk down and a hard man to shake in his beliefs, which change and mature slowly. A dogmatic man, if you like, but a purposeful one and, like Cézanne whom he acclaims, a rugged type with a scorn of frills and unmasculine prettiness—all of which may be discovered in his work.

=== Darebin ===
In 1936 Frater visited a flat in South Yarra owned by well-to-do Lina Bryans (née Hallenstein in Germany) to advise her on stained-glass windows, and painted her portrait. With his help and encouragement she decided to become an artist, producing her first works early in 1937, from which Basil Burdett (1897–1942) selected her Backyards, South Yarra for the 'Herald Exhibition of Outstanding Pictures of 1937.' One of Frater's best known works is The Red Hat, a portrait of Bryans dating from that year. She, using her inheritance, purchased Ambrose Hallen's former hotel-cum-studio at 899 Heidelberg Road, Darebin in which Ada May Plante had been living, and with her painted and decorated it distinctively, naming it "The Pink Hotel". Over the next decade Frater and she lived and painted there together after his separation from Winifred. The artists' colony included Plante, Hallen, Ian Fairweather, Arnold Shore and other artists, and attracted a group of writers associated with the journal Meanjin. Part of their circle were Nina and Clem Christesen whose 'Stanhope' in Eltham they frequented. Bryans sold the Darebin property in 1948, moving to Harkaway, near Berwick, then overseas in 1953.

=== Ascendancy ===
In 1938 he had joined and exhibited in Sydney with Robert Menzies' anti-modernist foundation, the Australian Academy of Art, but, given his ambivalence about conservative art, was to switch allegiance to the supporters modernism. In accordance with government war directives, the Yencken firm closed down his department in 1940 and Frater retired from stained-glass designing and, subsisting on his teaching, devoted himself to landscapes. He regarded a "certain strangeness", in his art in response to the Australian landscape as an essential attribute of great art. He exhibited at the Contemporary Art Society, and in solo shows at Georges Gallery, Melbourne, and the Macquarie Galleries, Sydney, in 1946, expanding his subject matter with visits sponsored by the airline TAA to Central Australia in 1950 and Port Douglas in 1952.

From 1959–1964 Frater was a painting tutor at Melbourne Technical College. He exhibited at Australian Galleries, Melbourne in 1958 and the Victorian Artists' Society in 1963, from which date he became president of the Society until 1972, exhibiting annually with them. Its main exhibition space was named Frater Gallery. In 1967, in the midst of the Vietnam War Frater joined in solidarity a controversial pacifist exhibition of the Victorian Branch of the Contemporary Art Society at Melbourne's Argus Gallery, traveling to Adelaide under the aegis of the South Australian Campaign for Peace in Vietnam.

Frater was given a retrospective at the National Gallery of Victoria in 1966 and a final exhibition in July 1973. His work is represented there, and in galleries and private collections throughout Australia as well as the Kelvingrove Art Gallery and Museum, Glasgow.

== Oral history ==
Frater was interviewed in 1961 by Hazel de Berg about his early life and career. The recording can be found at the National Library of Australia.

== Reception ==
Frater was not well known outside Victoria and his support and application of modernist principles in his art met often with uninterest or derision from Australia's mid-century conservative audiences. During the painter's period of adherence to tonalism, the reviewer of a 1919 Athenaeum showing of the Twenty Melbourne Painters group picked out Frater as "a gloomy enemy of light and gaiety who reports the weather with a stain on its character." The Bulletin of 29 May 1957 briefly reviewed the Victorian Artists’ Society’s autumn show incorporating the E. T. Cato £100 art prize and was dismissive of "William Frater’s Landscape, a simple and somewhat unsubstantial view of gumtrees which possibly owes something to Cezanne," which "cantered home in the oils division.". By contrast, Geoffrey Dutton in the new year, was more favourably disposed toward Frater's entry in Adelaide's John Martin's department store Christmas show, praising his "two fine landscapes of rolling pinks and reds."

However, by 1963 Frater's modernism, by comparison with the emerging painterly abstractionists, was assessed by critic Bill Hannan as beginning to be outmoded:

William Frater is an earlier pioneer, of modern rather than contemporary art. Cezanne still stalks through his painting as he did through most of Frater’s and Bell’s contemporaries. It is interesting to see how well this can stand up to very changed sensibilities. To go, say, from Olsen to Frater is to return substantially to an illusion of the visible world, despite the fact that Frater’s ideas are leagues away from naturalism. Distances shrink very rapidly in time. This is a huge exhibition, and the best of it is very attractive, especially the large airy landscapes and the nudes. One of the most striking qualities of the painting is its spaciousness, largely effected by sure handling of light and sun-washed color. Massively and simply composed, many of the paintings have an apparent breadth much greater than their real size.

Frater's work was flown to Papua New Guinea for an exhibition in 1973 that was intended to reveal the influence of the country's indigenous art on modernist painters. In a 1979 interview with James Gleeson, Albert Tucker confesses that when he "heard about people like George Bell and Jock Frater and Cezanne...I had this sudden extreme and rapid expansion of consciousness and vision around the middle to late thirties. It probably corresponded with a growth period for me. I had a sudden enormous expansion of horizons and possibilities. It was revolutionary for me."

The record price for a Frater work at auction is US$7,662 for a portrait of Diana Lang, sold at Deutscher & Hackett, Sydney in 2010

== Exhibitions ==
=== Solo ===
- 1971: The New 9 x 5 Impressionist Exhibition, Rosalind Humphries Galleries, Oct. 1st To Oct 24th 1971
- 1966: William Frater, National Gallery of Victoria, August 11-September 18, 1966
- 1955: William Frater with Vaughan Murray Griffin, Australian Galleries (joint show)
- 1946: Macquarie Galleries

=== Group ===
- 1973: Port Morseby, Papua New Guinea
- 1958: John Martin's department store, Adelaide, Christmas show
- 1957: Victorian Artists’ Society's autumn show incorporating the E. T. Cato £100 art prize won by Frater
- 1954/5: Portrait exhibition, National Gallery of Victoria, December–February
- 1954: Spring exhibition of the Victorian Artists' Society
- 1919: Twenty Melbourne Painters group show, Athenaeum

=== Posthumous ===
- 2011, Touring exhibition Scottish painters in Australia, Castlemaine Art Gallery and Historical Museum
- 2006: The sound of the sky, Museum and Art Gallery of the Northern Territory
- 1998/9 Classic Cezanne, Art Gallery of New South Wales, 28 November 1998 - 28 February 1999
- 1991: William Frater 1880–1974, Niagara Gallery, Melbourne June 12–29
- 1989: Spring exhibitions, October 9–16 and 17–24 September, Jim Alexander Gallery
- 1980: Australian Galleries, Melbourne
- 1979: Misty moderns: Australian tonalists 1915–1950, Art Gallery of South Australia

== Awards ==
Frater won the Dunlop art competition in 1950 and the Eltham Art Award in 1964. In 1974 Frater was appointed O.B.E. for his services to art, and died at his home at Alphington on 28 November that year and was buried in Arthurs Creek cemetery. He was survived by his four sons and daughter.

== Collections ==
- National Gallery of Australia
- Art Gallery of New South Wales
- National Gallery of Victoria
- Castlemaine Art Museum

== Bibliography ==
- Australian Galleries catalogue 1980 (photocopy)
- Australian Galleries catalogue (joint show William Frater with Vaughan Murray Griffin), 1955 (photocopy)
- Crawford, Ashley (2006), Directory of Australian art (1st ed.), Craftsman House, ISBN 978-0-9751965-3-3
- Dober, Mark (22 December 2001), "A Melbourne modernist.('William Frater: A Life with Colour')", Overland (163), O.L. Society Ltd: 126(1), ISSN 0030-7416
- Frater, William; National Gallery of Victoria (1966), William Frater : [exhibition held] August 11-September 18, 1966, the Gallery
- Hetherington, John; Kahan, Louis, 1905–2002 (1963), Australian painters: forty profiles, Cheshire
- Jim Alexander Gallery exhibition catalogue, 1989 (photocopy)
- Kershaw, Alister; Harrison, Brian (1993), Hey days : memories and glimpses of Melbourne's Bohemia 1937–1947, Royal Blind Society
- Lock-Weir, Tracey; Art Gallery of South Australia (1979), Misty moderns : Australian tonalists 1915–1950, Art Gallery of South Australia, ISBN 978-0-7308-3015-3
- Macquarie Galleries exhibition catalogue, 1946 (photocopy)
- Alan McCulloch; Nodrum, Charles (1984), Encyclopedia of Australian art, Hawthorn, Vic Hutchinson of Australia, ISBN 978-0-09-148250-3
- Murray, Daena (2006), The Sound of the Sky, Charles Darwin University Press, ISBN 978-0-9802923-0-5
- Hoff, Ursula, 1909–2005 (1973), The National Gallery of Victoria, Thames and Hudson, ISBN 978-0-500-18139-3
- Perry, Peter W., 1952-; McKay, Kirsten (2011), Scottish painters in Australia, Castlemaine Art Gallery and Historical Museum, ISBN 978-0-9807831-3-1
- Prunster, Ursula ‘Seeing Cezanne - Australian Affinities.’ In Cézanne, Paul; Maloon, Terence; Gundert, Angela (1998), Classic Cezanne, Art Gallery of New South Wales, ISBN 978-0-7313-8930-8
- Retrospective – National Gallery of Victoria. Essay by Brian Finnemore. 67 works listed, National Gallery of Victoria, 1966, stapled pb, 12pp.
- Smith, Bernard (1962), Australian painting 1788–1960, Oxford University Press
- State Library of Victoria; Hanks, Elizabeth, 1937-; Library Council of Victoria (1982), Australian art and artists to 1950 : a bibliography based on the holdings of the State Library of Victoria, Library Council of Victoria, ISBN 978-0-909962-40-1
- Stuartholme-Behan Collection of Australian Art; MacAulay, Bettina, (curator.); Macaulay, Desmond, (curator.); University of Queensland Art Museum, (publisher) (2010), The Behan legacy: the Stuartholme-Behan Collection of Australian Art, The University of Queensland Art Museum, ISBN 978-1-86499-992-1
- Shore, Arnold (1957), 40 years: seek and find, S.N
- The New 9 x 5 Impressionist Exhibition, Rosalind Humphries Galleries, Oct. 1st To Oct 24th 1971. Essay by Rosalind Humphries, 45 major artists listed. 1971, 8pp, cover is reproduction of 1889 9 x 5 catalogue cover printed on balsa wood (?). Inside back cover has announcement for Clarice Beckett exhibition to follow.
- Thomas, Laurie F (1976), The most noble art of them all: the selected writings of Laurie Thomas, University of Queensland Press, ISBN 978-0-7022-1370-0
- Thompson, John; Counihan, Noel, 1913–1986; Australian Broadcasting Commission; Thompson, John, 1907–1968 (1962), On lips of living men, Lansdowne
- Victoria College (Melbourne, Vic.) (1988), A selection from the Victoria college art collection, Victoria College
- The Melbourne Modernists- Frater, Plante, Shore, Tweddle, Victorian Artists Society, 1990
- William Frater 1880–1974, Niagara Gallery catalogue, 48 exhibits, Illustrated in colour, June, 1991, pb, price list inserted
- William Street Gallery, 1988, pb, Griffin Vaughan Murray
- Wittman, Richard; Frater, William, 1890–1974 (2000), William Frater: a life with colour, The Miegunyah Press, ISBN 978-0-522-84825-0
- Zimmer, Jenny (1984), Stained glass in Australia, Oxford University Press, ISBN 978-0-19-554369-8
- Jost, Mack; Horsham Regional Art Gallery (1986), The Mack Jost collection, City of Horsham Regional Art Gallery, ISBN 978-1-86252-400-2
- Mackie, Elizabeth (1981), The artists of Kew, E. Mackie, ISBN 978-0-9594081-0-2
