= Arnold Shore =

Twentieth-century Australian artist, teacher and art critic

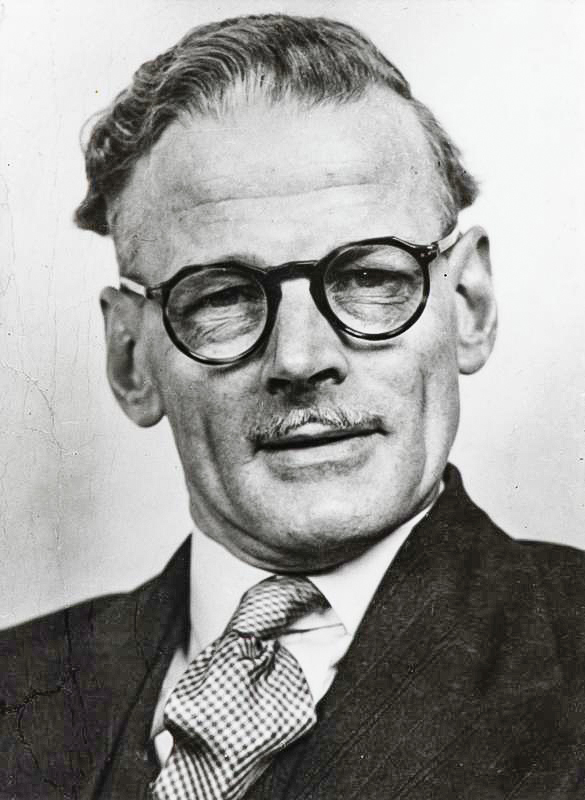
- Arnold Shore
- Born: 5 May 1897; Windsor, Victoria
- Died: 22 May 1963 (aged 66); Hawthorn, Victoria
- Education: National Gallery of Victoria Art School 1912–1917, then Max Meldrum
- Known for: painter, teacher, art critic: Sun New-Pictorial (1934–5), The Argus (1950), The Age (1957-63)
- Style: Post-Impressionism
- Movement: Modernism
- Spouse: Agnes Vivien Scott
- Partner(s): George Bell in the Bell-Shore art school, car Bourke and Queen Sts, Melbourne
- Awards: Herald; 1937 picture -of-the-year – joint winner Crouch Prize; 1938 winner McPhillimy Prize, Geelong; 1939 winner Victorian Artists' Society; 1961 medal of honour
- Elected: President, Victorian Artists' Society (1958-61)

Arnold Joseph Victor Shore (5 May 1897, Windsor – 22 May 1963, Melbourne) was an Australian painter, teacher and critic.

== Biography ==
Shore was the youngest of seven children of John Shore, a coachsmith, and his wife Harriett Sarah, née McDonough. He left Prahran West State School at age 12 and with the help of his brother was apprenticed at Brooks, Robinson & Co. Ltd, North Melbourne, designers and makers of stained glass. Soon, when his artistic talent was recognised, he became a designer and worked there for more than twenty years, supporting his widowed mother.

There he befriended fellow worker, the artist William Frater. Together they are acknowledged as among the first to experiment with modernism in Melbourne.

In 1938 after his mother's death, Shore sold the family home in Windsor and moved to Mount Macedon, and painted in its surrounding landscape.

After a long-term relationship with an older woman and mourning her death, he married Agnes Vivien Scott in 1950 and they moved to suburban Hawthorn.

== Training ==
From 1912 Shore studied under Frederick McCubbin in evening classes at the Victorian National Gallery School until 1917, and that year joined the Victorian Artists' Society, which he quit the following year in accord with Max Meldrum, with whom he also trained.

== Artist ==
In the 1950s he was to return to the VAS, and was its president 1958–61. After Meldrum's school closed in 1923, Shore joined the Twenty Melbourne Painters exhibiting with them for many years. From 1924 he abandoned Meldrum's tonalism and though he never left Australia and knew them only from reproductions, adopted Post-Impressionist and styles of contemporary European artists. He exhibited, in a solo show at the Atheneum, one of the earliest displays of modern art in the city. In 1932 he was a foundation member of the Contemporary Art Group, with A. E. Alsop, Rupert Bunny, George Bell, Ian Fairweather, William Frater, Daryl Lindsay, Ada May Plante, Evelyn Syme, C. S. Powers, Isobel Tweddle and Eric Thake, a forerunner of Melbourne's Contemporary Art Society. He joined the Group in three annual exhibitions, two in Melbourne and one in Sydney. In 1937 his second solo show was at Macquarie Galleries in Sydney, a critical and commercial success. His work was purchased by Colonel Aubrey Gibson, whose collection was shown at the National Gallery of Victoria in 1969.

== Educator ==
With George Bell in 1932 he established the Bell-Shore School in an upstairs studio on the corner of Bourke and Queen Streets, Melbourne in which they taught modern painting, with Shore running it alone when Bell traveled overseas. After Bell's return, disagreements caused them to separate. Shore became a foundation member of, and exhibited with, Robert Menzies' anti-modernist organisation, the Australian Academy of Art. while Bell was vehemently opposed to its conservatism and set up the Contemporary Art Society in competition, to foster modernism. In 1947 Shore moved to Sydney, but the following year he returned to Melbourne where he was employed as Guide Lecturer, introducing visitors to the collection of the National Gallery of Victoria until 1957. Shore is reported to have mentored John Perceval and inspired Noel Counihan to become an artist.

== Art critic ==
Shore was art critic on The Sun News-Pictorial, Melbourne replacing the regular critic, George Bell over 1934–35, on the Argus from 1949 to 1958, and on The Age 1950 and 1957–63. He was judge in 1950 for Geelong Art Gallery's annual competition for the McPhillimy prize for a painting in oils, an award he had himself won in 1938. He wrote two books; a brief autobiography; and a monograph on Tom Roberts, which was posthumously published in 1964 by Oxford University Press.

== Style and reception ==
Shore painted in a spontaneous post-impressionist style to depict the Australian bush, still-life, and some portraits. McCulloch identifies a "freshness of colour, atmosphere and light and the lush texture of roughly laid on paint" as characteristic of his work, which featured prominently in the exhibition Classical Modernism: The George Bell Circle, at the National Gallery of Victoria in 1992. Patrick McCaughey identifies Shore as a pioneer of Australian modernism, and one of "the wave of post impressionists in the 'twenties and 'thirties," with William Frater, George Bell and Adrian Lawlor, who "rediscovered" the "impetus of the modern". Robert Haysom in his monograph demonstrates the influence of Van Gogh on Shore.

== Exhibitions ==
- 1929, August: One-person exhibition.
- 1940, 7–21 August: Arnold Shore, landscapes and still life, opened by Russell Grimwade, Velasquez Gallery
- 1943, from 1 December; Inclusion in a group show of ninety-one paintings and etchings with Allan Jordan, Max Meldrum, John Rowell, Jas. Quinn, John Farmer, Mary Hurry, Dora Serle, Margaret Pestell, Dora Wilson, Isabel Tweddle, Aileen Dent, Murray Griffin, Geo. Colville, and Victor Cog. Hawthorn Library.
- 1945: First annual exhibition, artists E. Alsop, Wallace Anderson, Clothilde Atyeo, A. M. E. Bale, E. Monette Baxter, Tom Bell, Josl Bergner, Arthur Boyd, Ian Bow, Lina Bryans, Nutter Buzacott, Victor E. Cobb, Valerie Cohen, Yvonne F. Cohen, W. Coleman, Elizabeth Colquhoun, F. Lawrence Coles, Noel Counihan, Sybil Craig, Peggy Crombie, Mabel Crump, Aileen Dent, Max Dimmack, Ailsa Donaldson, Ambrose Dyson, Esme Farmer, John Farmer, Alma Figuerola, Burton Fox, Madge Freeman, William Frater, Grace Gardiner, Ina Gregory, Nornie Gude, W. G. Gulliver, Michael Hall, John Heath, Edward Heffernan, Roy Opie, Betty Paterson, Esther Paterson, John Perceval, A. Plante, Muriel Pornett, James Quinn, M. Rankin, Jack Sampson, Dora Serle, Bruno Simon, David Sing, Colvin L. Smith, J. T. Smith, W. Spence, N. F. Suhr, Jean P. Sutherland, Jo Sweatman, E. W. Syme, Arnold Shore, Stephanie Taylor, George H. Tichauer, Louise Thomas, Violet Teague, Francis Roy Thompson, (Note: See New Gallery of Fine Art.) Rollo Thomson, Albert Tucker, Kit Turner, Danila Vassilieff, J. Wentcher, Tina Wentcher, James V. Wigley, Nora Wilkie, Dora L. Wilson, Noel Wood, Marjorie Woolcock, Joan Yonge, Marguerite Mahood. Velasquez Gallery.

== Awards ==
- 1937: Herald picture-of-the-year prize (shared with Longstaff), Athenaeum Gallery
- 1938 Crouch Prize
- 1939: McPhillimy Prize, Geelong
- 1961: medal of honour, Victorian Artists Society, "for distinguished service to art as artist, critic, teacher and guide lecturer."

== Collections ==
- National Gallery of Australia
- Art Gallery of New South Wales
- Art Gallery of South Australia
- Art Gallery of Western Australia
- National Gallery of Victoria
- Queensland Art Gallery
- Tasmanian Museum and Art Gallery
- Art Gallery of Ballarat
- Bendigo Art Gallery
- Castlemaine Art Museum
