= William Salmon (painter) =

Australian painter

William Arthur Salmon (9 April 1928 – 27 October 2018), generally known as Bill Salmon, was an Australian painter.

Bill was born in Geelong, Victoria the son of John Walter Salmon (died 20 September 1956) and his wife Clarice Bennett Salmon (née Taylor) of Camperdown and studied at the Swinburne Technical College 1946–1949 and the George Bell School in Melbourne then the Slade School of Art in London 1950–1952.

He taught art at the South Australian School of Arts and Crafts 1953–1957, during which time he painted a mural of St. Francis of Assisi for the Assisi Hall, Campbelltown, and East Sydney Technical College 1959–1962.

He appeared regularly (as "Apelles") in the Arts segment of the Argonauts' Club children's programme on ABC radio from 1963, succeeding Jeffrey Smart ("Phidias"), and has appeared on television interviewing artists including Clifton Pugh, Sidney Nolan and Roland Wakelin.

He also appeared as the Australian host of Transworld Top Team on ABC TV from 1967 to 1968.

He painted a portrait of poet Charles Rischbieth Jury held by Elspeth Ballantyne.

== Sources ==
- Encyclopedia of Australian Art Alan McCulloch, Hutchison of London, 1968
