= Tweddell =

Tweddell may refer to:

- Ed Tweddell (c. 1941–2005), Australian businessman
- John Tweddell (1769–1799), English classical scholar and traveller
- Ralph Hart Tweddell (1843–1895), English engineer, inventor of the portable hydraulic riveter
- William Tweddell (1897–1985), English golfer

== See also ==
- Tweddell remains affair, a controversy over the possessions of John Tweddell
- Tweddle (disambiguation)
