= Max Meldrum =

Australian painter (1875–1955)

Duncan Max Meldrum
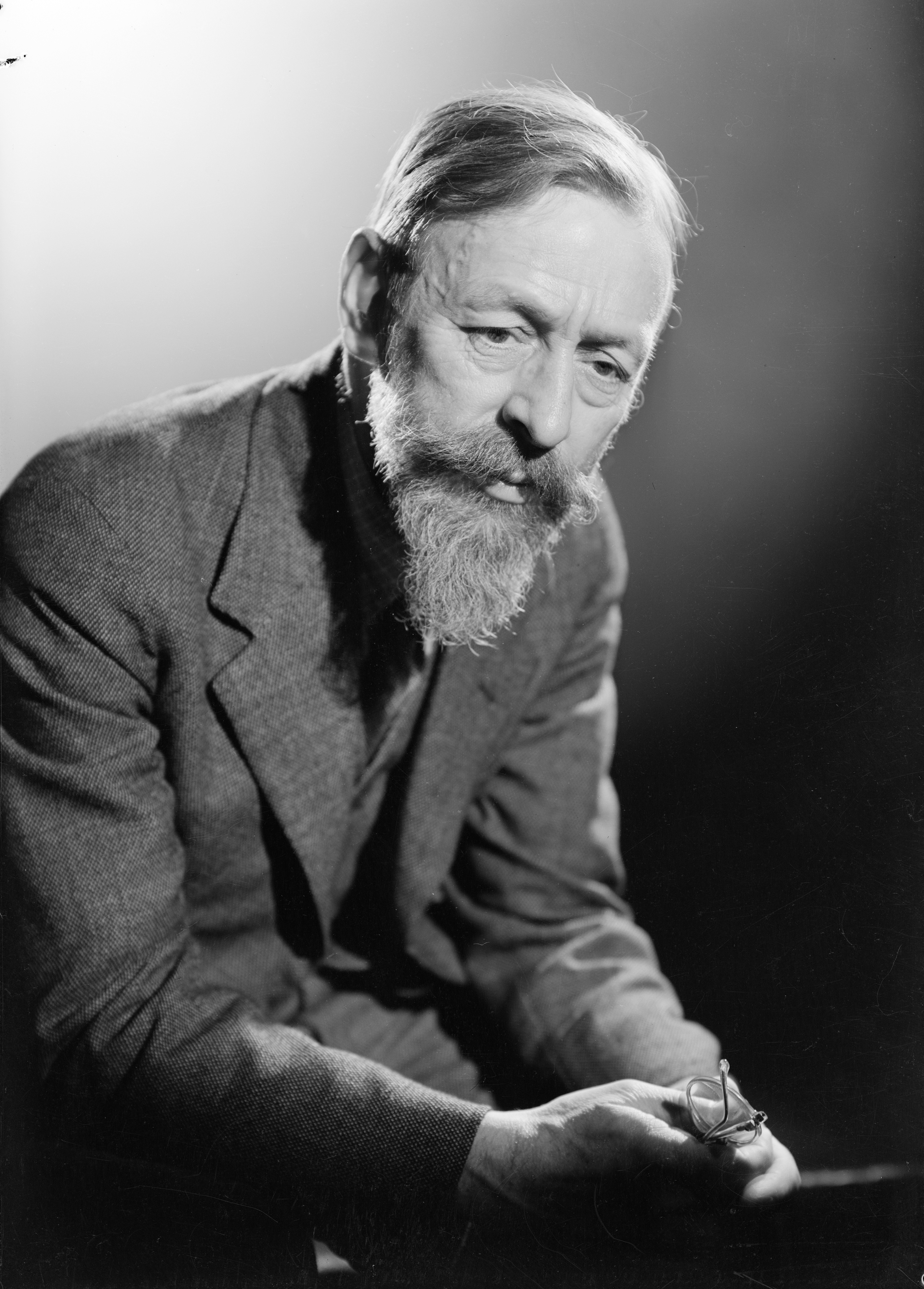
- Max Dupain c. 1937 Max Meldrum at 62
- Born: 3 December 1875; Edinburgh, Scotland
- Died: 6 June 1955 (aged 79); Melbourne, Victoria, Australia
- Known for: Painting
- Movement: Australian tonalism

Duncan Max Meldrum (3 December 1875 – 6 June 1955) was a Scottish-born Australian artist and art teacher, best known as the founder of Australian tonalism, a representational painting style that became popular in Melbourne during the interwar period. He also won fame for his portrait work, winning the prestigious Archibald Prize for portraiture in 1939 and 1940.

== Early life ==
Max Meldrum was born in 1875 in Edinburgh, Scotland. His father, Edward Meldrum, was an analytical chemist and his mother, Christina Meldrum (née Macglashan), a schoolteacher. Products of the Scottish enlightenment, both parents fervently embraced scientific progress and empiricism. His mother was said to be particularly zealous in her beliefs in scientific progress, having “inverted Calvinism into an equally fierce agnosticism…[her] eyes would gleam with holy fire while she would orate upon her favorite scheme of filling the churches with scientific instruments and the cathedrals with mighty telescopes.” Edward, who was friends with many of the city’s painters, introduced Max to art from an early age - he and his father spent many a day touring the city’s well-regarded art galleries when Max was a young boy.

In 1889, the family – Edward, Christina, Max, and Max’s two brothers – emigrated to Australia. His sister Elizabeth was born soon after their arrival in Melbourne. Once there, Max decided the academic life was not for him and quit formal schooling. Initially taking up a clerkship at a wool store, in 1892 he enrolled in the School of Design at the Melbourne National Gallery Art School.

== Learning the painting trade ==
Max entered the National Gallery Art School in 1892, the very same year that Lindsay Bernard Hall, a staunchly conservative English-born artist and teacher, began his long tenure as the school’s director. Bernand Hall took a classical approach to teaching; before a student could even pick up a brush they had to first master charcoal drawing to a level that their work could be included in the school's annual exhibition. He believed painting should “proceed from breadth to detail, from general to particular truths, but always to see them in their order of importance; that is, to draw.” In addition to classes at the National Gallery, Meldrum also studied under George Coates. Coates' classes, held at the North Melbourne Trades Hall, became a gathering point for Melbourne’s bohemian scene and were attended by artists such as Lional and Percy Lindsey, as well as George Bell.

To help with his tuition and expenses, Max also produced illustrations for Champion, a short-lived local paper launched by journalist, publisher, and socialist Henry Hyde Champion.

=== The National Gallery Travelling Scholarship ===
Beginning in 1887, the National Gallery held a painting competition, the winner of which was awarded the prestigious National Gallery Travelling Scholarship. Students at the school were invited to submit a work based on a common subject which were judged by Melbourne’s art establishment. The winner was awarded the tidy sum £150 per annum for three years to continue honing their skills abroad.

In 1899, Bernard Hall chose “Welcome News” as the subject of the season’s competition. Eight works were submitted, from artists including Hugh Ramsey, Norman MacGeorge, and Elsie Hake (Barlow). Meldrum’s submission emerged victorious, with Ramsey’s piece coming second, amid some controversy. Upon winning, Meldrum is said to have slashed his entry to pieces, exclaiming he “would never again put an insincere brush to canvas.”

Max chose Paris as his destination for the travelling scholarship.

=== Paris ===
Meldrum set off for France in April 1900, arriving first in London before quickly making his way to Paris. The terms of his scholarship required him to produce three paintings over the three-year period: a nude study, a copy of an old master, and an original work.

Upon arriving in Paris, he took up residence at 7 Rue Delambre in Montpernasse, an area popular with émigré artists at the time. His apartment was a short walk from the Académie Colarossi, where he began studying under L. J. R. Collin and Gustave Courtois, late proponents of the French Academic style. By March 1901, Meldrum was also taking additional classes at Académie Julian under Jean-Paul Laurens, an anti-clerical republican who also taught the Academic style.

Despite his dedication to study – classes occupied both his days and his nights – Meldrum quickly became disillusioned with the quality of the training. In a letter to a friend dated June 1900, he compares the painting instruction he received in Melbourne favorably to that in Paris and hints at pursuing a more self-directed approach to his study. By mid-1901, he was living with his uncle in Edinburgh where he continued work on his study of the nude. By the end of that year he had shipped his completed work to the scholarship’s trustees in Melbourne.

Meldrum had returned to Paris by 1902 to attend the Louvre to work on his copy of Paolo Veronese’s The Flight of Loth (AKA Flight from Sodom). While he again took up places at the academies, it was more for want of a place to work, later remarking that he “took little interest” in their teaching.

Amongst his associates in Paris was a painter from Rennes in Brittany, Charles Nitsch. The two painted together around Rennes and Pacé, Ille-et-Vilaine, often sharing the same subjects. Meldrum met Nitsch's family and married his sister Jeanne Eugenie Nitsch in 1907. From Rennes he successfully submitted paintings to the New Salon in 1904, 1905, 1908, 1911.

== Career ==
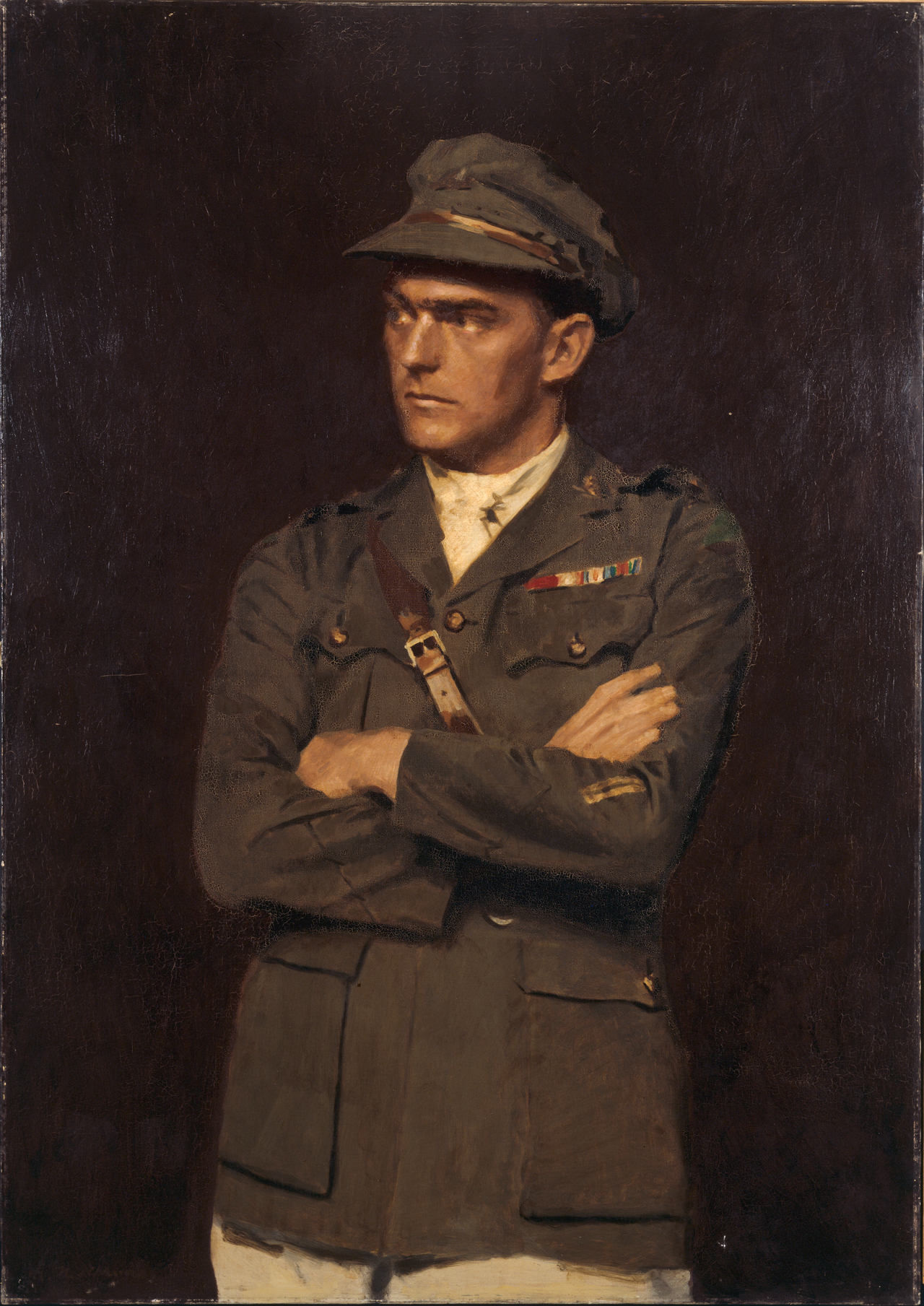
Percy Storkey, VC, c1920, oil painting by Max Meldrum

He ran the Meldrum School of Painting there between 1916 and 1926. Among his students were Clarice Beckett, Colin Colahan, Auguste Cornels, Percy Leason, John Farmer, Polly Hurry, Justus Jorgensen, Arnold Shore and Gray Smith, and had considerable influence on the work of his friend Alexander Colquhoun, whose son Archibald was also a Meldrum student at that time. In 1916–17 he was elected president of the Victorian Artists' Society, but was dropped from the position amidst controversy the following year, inspiring his students to form a breakaway group, the Twenty Melbourne Painters Society, which remains active in the Melbourne arts scene to this day. Drawing on Meldrum's principles, the group released a statement describing their central tenet:

We desire nothing but sincerity and a humble study of nature, from which alone all art, whether decorative or realistic, draws any enduring life.

Meldrum influenced the young Albert Ernest Newbury.

== On modern art ==
Despite his leadership of a group, the Australian tonalists, which has lately come to be regarded as a precursor to minimalism, Meldrum's attitude to modern art was reactionary; in 1937 he described it as 'savagery', 'crude and vile' and 'likely to debase the taste of our children', condemning one example as 'an explosion in a sawmill'.

== On women artists ==
Though women were amongst his followers, with one, Clarice Beckett, whom he held in high regard, Meldrum in criticizing Nora Heysen's winning the 1938 Archibald Prize, proclaimed:

"Men and women are differently constituted. Women are more closely attached to the physical things of life, and to expect them to do some things equally as well as men is sheer lunacy [...] A great artist has to tread a lonely road. He becomes great only by exerting himself to the limit of his strength the whole time. I believe that such a life is unnatural and impossible for a woman."

== Personal life ==
While living in France, he married Jeanne Eugenie Nitsch, a singer with the Opéra-Comique. Meldrum and his wife returned to Australia firstly in 1912 and by 1915 he had received official portrait commissions and established his teaching practice. In April 1926 he returned with his wife and two daughters for another extended period of residence in France, spending time in Paris and Rennes. Meldrum also undertook a successful lecture tour of North America in 1928. Meldrum and his family returned permanently to Melbourne on board the cargo liner Éridan in 1931.

== Death ==
Meldrum died on 6 June 1955 in Kew, Victoria, aged 79.

== Exhibitions ==
- 1943, from 1 December; Inclusion in a group show of ninety-one paintings and etchings with Arnold Shore, Allan Jordan, John Rowell, Jas. Quinn, John Farmer, Mary Hurry, Dora Serle, Margaret Pestell, Dora Wilson, Isabel Tweddle, Aileen Dent, Murray Griffin, Geo. Colville, and Victor Cog. Hawthorn Library.

Awards
Preceded by Nora Heysen	Archibald Prize; 1939 for The Hon. G. J. Bell, Speaker, House of Representatives 1940 for Dr. J. Forbes McKenzie	Succeeded by William Dargie

== Manuscript sources ==
- Correspondence Max Meldrum, 1950, State Library of New South Wales, MLMSS 5288 Add-on 1933/Box 01
