= Tweedle Dee, Tweedle Dum =

Tweedle Dee, Tweedle Dum may refer to:

- "Tweedle Dee & Tweedle Dum" (song), Bob Dylan song from his 2001 album Love and Theft
- "Tweedle Dee, Tweedle Dum" (song), 1971 song by Middle of the Road also found on their album Chirpy Chirpy Cheep Cheep

See also

- Tweedledum and Tweedledee, fictional characters in an English nursery rhyme and in Lewis Carroll's Through the Looking-Glass, and What Alice Found There
- "Tweedlee Dee" (also "Tweedly Dee" or "Tweedle Dee"), R&B novelty song with a Latin-influenced riff written by Winfield Scott sung by LaVern Baker.
