= Twiddle =

Twiddle or twiddling may refer to:

- Twiddle (band), an American rock band
- Twiddle factor, used in fast Fourier transforms in mathematics
- Bit twiddler (disambiguation), for various uses in computing
- Thumb twiddling, action of the hands indicating nervousness, irritation or boredom
- Twiddly bits, English idiom
- Mr Twiddle, zookeeper character in Wally Gator animated TV series
- "Twiddling", the constant fine-tuning of online platforms that is part of the enshittification process

== See also ==
- Tilde character ( ~ ), sometimes referred to as "twiddle" or "squiggle"
- Twiddler, a one-handed input device
