= Isabel May Tweddle =

Australian painter

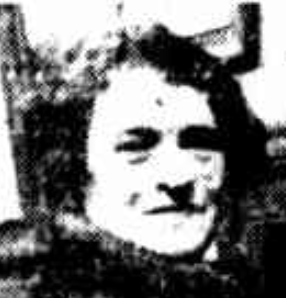
- Isabel May Tweddle, 1933
- Born: Isabel May Hunter; 26 November 1875; Deniliquin, New South Wales, Australia
- Died: 9 July 1945 (aged 69); Melbourne, Victoria, Australia
- Known for: Painting
- Spouse: Joseph Thornton Tweddle (m. 1904–1943)

Isabel May (Diana) Tweddle (1875–1945), was an Australian painter. She was a member of the Melbourne Society of Women Painters and Sculptors and the Twenty Melbourne Painters Society Inc. A number of her paintings are in the collections of the Shepparton Art Museum, the National Gallery of Victoria, and the Art Gallery of New South Wales.

== Biography ==
Tweddle was born Isabel May Hunter on 26 November 1875 in New South Wales. From 1894–1897 she studied at the National Gallery School in Melbourne. There she met fellow artist Ada May Plante.

After her studies she began exhibiting at the Victorian Artists Society. In 1904 she married Joseph Thornton Tweddle, an Australian businessman and philanthropist. The couple traveled throughout Europe, and lived in London, England in 1921. Tweddle visited Scandinavia and the Pacific (the Solomon Islands, New Guinea, and Japan). Her paintings from those trips were exhibited in London.

Tweddle had an interest in Post-Impressionist art, mainly though the work of Arnold Shore and William Frater. She is thought to have influenced Sybil Craig, Peggie Crombie and Jessie Mackintosh.

She was a member of many artistic groups in Melbourne; the Contemporary Art Group, the Contemporary Art Society, the Melbourne Society of Women Painters and Sculptors, and the Women's Art Club.

Her paintings are in the collections of the Shepparton Art Museum, the National Gallery of Victoria, and the Art Gallery of New South Wales.

== Death and legacy ==
Tweddle died on 9 July 1945 in Melbourne.

Tweddle Place in the Canberra suburb of Chisholm is named in her honour.

== Exhibitions ==
- 1943, from 1 December; Inclusion in a group show of ninety-one paintings and etchings with Arnold Shore, Max Meldrum, John Rowell, Jas. Quinn, John Farmer, Mary Hurry, Dora Serle, Margaret Pestell, Dora Wilson, Allan Jordan, Aileen Dent, Murray Griffin, Geo. Colville, and Victor Cog. Hawthorn Library.

== Gallery ==
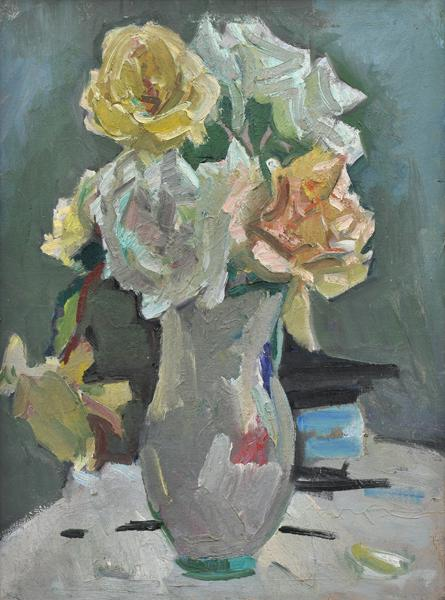
Roses

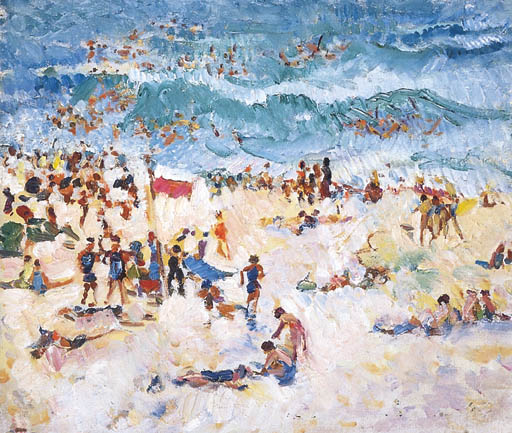
Beach Scene

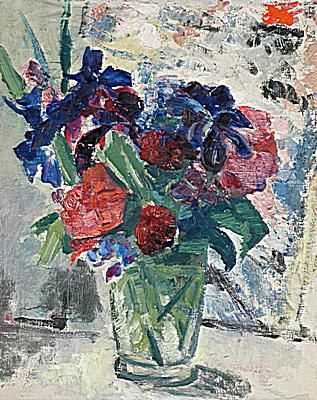
Still Life

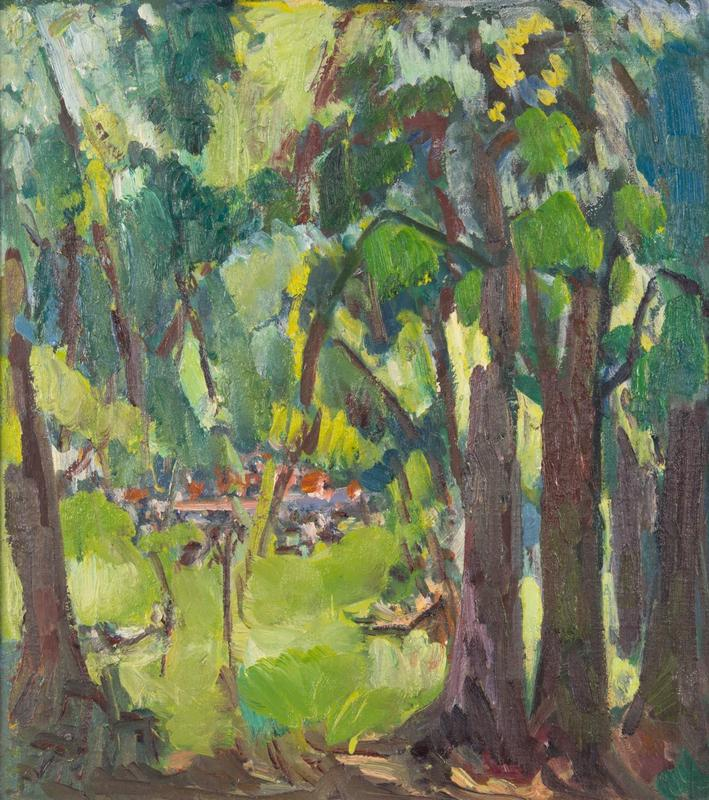
Through the Forest

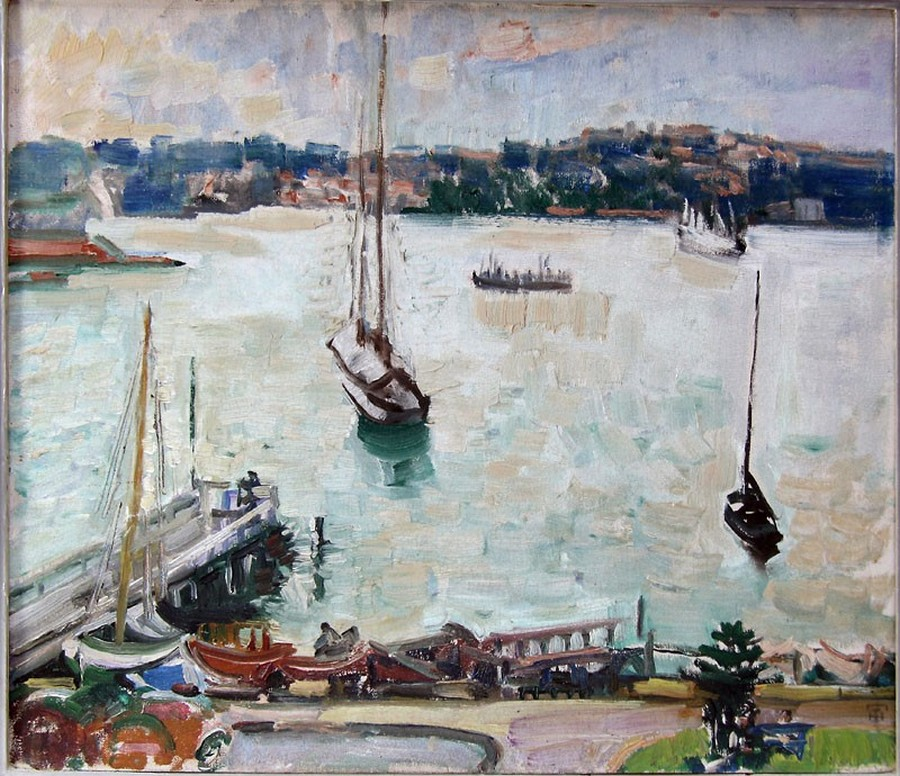
Elizabeth Bay
