= Ian Fairweather =

Scottish-born Australian painter (1891–1974)

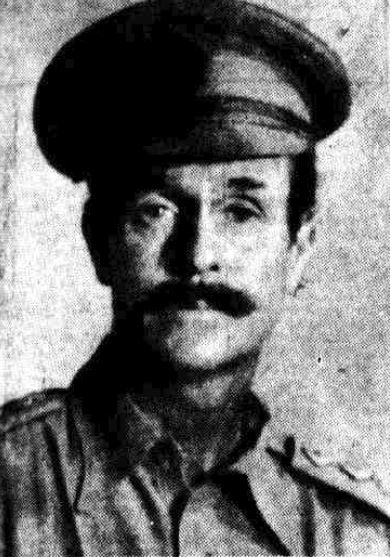
- Ian Fairweather during World War II
- Born: 29 September 1891; Bridge of Allan, Stirlingshire, Scotland
- Died: 20 May 1974 (aged 82); Brisbane, Queensland, Australia
- Known for: Painting

Ian Fairweather (29 September 1891 – 20 May 1974) was a Scottish painter resident in Australia for much of his life. He combined Western and Asian influences in his work.

== Life ==
Ian Fairweather was born in Bridge of Allan, Stirlingshire, Scotland in 1891. His parents returned to India when he was a baby, leaving him in the care of a great-aunt, and he did not see them again until he was 10 years old. He received early schooling at Victoria College in Jersey, in London, and in Champéry, Switzerland, before attending officer training school at Belfast where his rank was second lieutenant.

He was captured by the Germans in the first days of World War I in France at the Battle of Mons and spent the next four years in prisoner-of-war camps. While captured, he was permitted to study drawing, Chinese and Japanese. He was responsible for the illustrations in many POW magazines. His four-year incarceration included lengthy periods of solitary confinement as a result of repeated escape attempts.

After the war he studied art in the Netherlands, London and Munich. In 1918, he studied at the Royal Academy of Art in The Hague, and then privately with Johan Hendrik van Mastenbroek. In 1921 he attended the School of Oriental Studies studying Japanese and between 1920 and 1924 he attended the prestigious Slade School of Fine Art in London. From this time on he began a wandering existence travelling to Canada, Shanghai, Bali, Colombo and Australia. Wherever he was, he painted, and mailed paintings to galleries, initially with little commercial success. In 1934, in Melbourne, he joined artists Lina Bryans, Ada Plante, William (Jock) Frater, Ambrose Hallen and others at Darebin Bridge House, a converted coach-house at Darebin owned by Bryans. He began a mural for the Menzies Hotel at this time.

Later that year he left Australia via Sydney and Brisbane for the Philippines. He then travelled to many places including Shanghai, Peking, Manila, Brisbane, Singapore and Calcutta. He served with the British Army, 5th Mahratta Light Infantry with the rank of captain in India from 1941 to 1943. Discharged from the army in 1943, he travelled to Australia and visited Melbourne Cairns, Cooktown, and Brisbane before eventually settling into a studio back at Darebin in Melbourne.

By this time his paintings had become widely known and had already been acquired by the Contemporary Art Society, London, the Tate and Leicester City Gallery.

After moving back to Cairns and Townsville, in 1951 he moved to Darwin where, after living in abandoned trucks and boats, and probably suffering from depression, he built a raft and embarked on a solo voyage into the open sea. Thought by the Australians to have perished after searches were unsuccessful, he survived and beached on Rote Island in Indonesia. Discovered by Indonesian authorities, he was imprisoned and eventually deported. He travelled to London via Singapore and returned to Brisbane in 1953, aged 62. He built a hut on Bribie Island in Queensland, where he lived for the rest of his life except for visits to India and London during the 1960s.

== Works ==
One of his paintings, Monastery, acquired by the National Gallery of Australia, was described by critics at the time as a masterpiece. It was singled out by fellow Australian artist James Gleeson, who said, "He has fashioned an extraordinarily fascinating hybrid from the pictorial traditions of Europe and the calligraphy of China..." (The Sydney Morning Herald, 14 June 1961)

He is one of the few European painters to have drawn extensively from Oceanian art. His style has been described as "a paragon of sophisticated clumsiness". He often used the cheapest materials such as cardboard or newspaper and poor quality paints, and many of his works were lost or became damaged by the tropical climate in which he lived.

Fairweather's work was included in the exhibition "Australian Painting Today" at the Tate Gallery, London, and in the same year was selected to represent Australia at the São Paulo Art Biennial.

He is represented in all state galleries in Australia, the Tate Gallery, London, City Gallery, Leicester, and the Ulster Museum, Belfast. The only exhibition of his own works he ever saw was a 1964 retrospective at the Queensland Art Gallery.

In 1965 Fairweather published The Drunken Buddha which he had translated from the Chinese and illustrated with twelve of his paintings. It is a novel based on the life of Tao Chi whose eccentric approach to religious teaching was in accordance with an ancient and respected Chinese tradition of how a sage should behave.

Fairweather was interviewed in 1965 by Hazel de Berg on his life history. The interview can be found at the National Library of Australia.

Australian writer Murray Bail has written the monograph Fairweather (1981; revised edition 2009).

Ian Fairweather: A Life in Letters by Claire Roberts and John Thompson was published in October 2019 by Text Publishing.

In April 2019, Fairweather's painting Barbecue sold for $1.7 million.

QAGOMA (Queensland Art Gallery and Gallery of Modern Art) held the exhibition "Birds of Passage" from 2024 until January 2026, juxtaposing Fairweather with Paul Jacoulet.

== See also ==
- Australian art
