= Shepparton Art Museum =

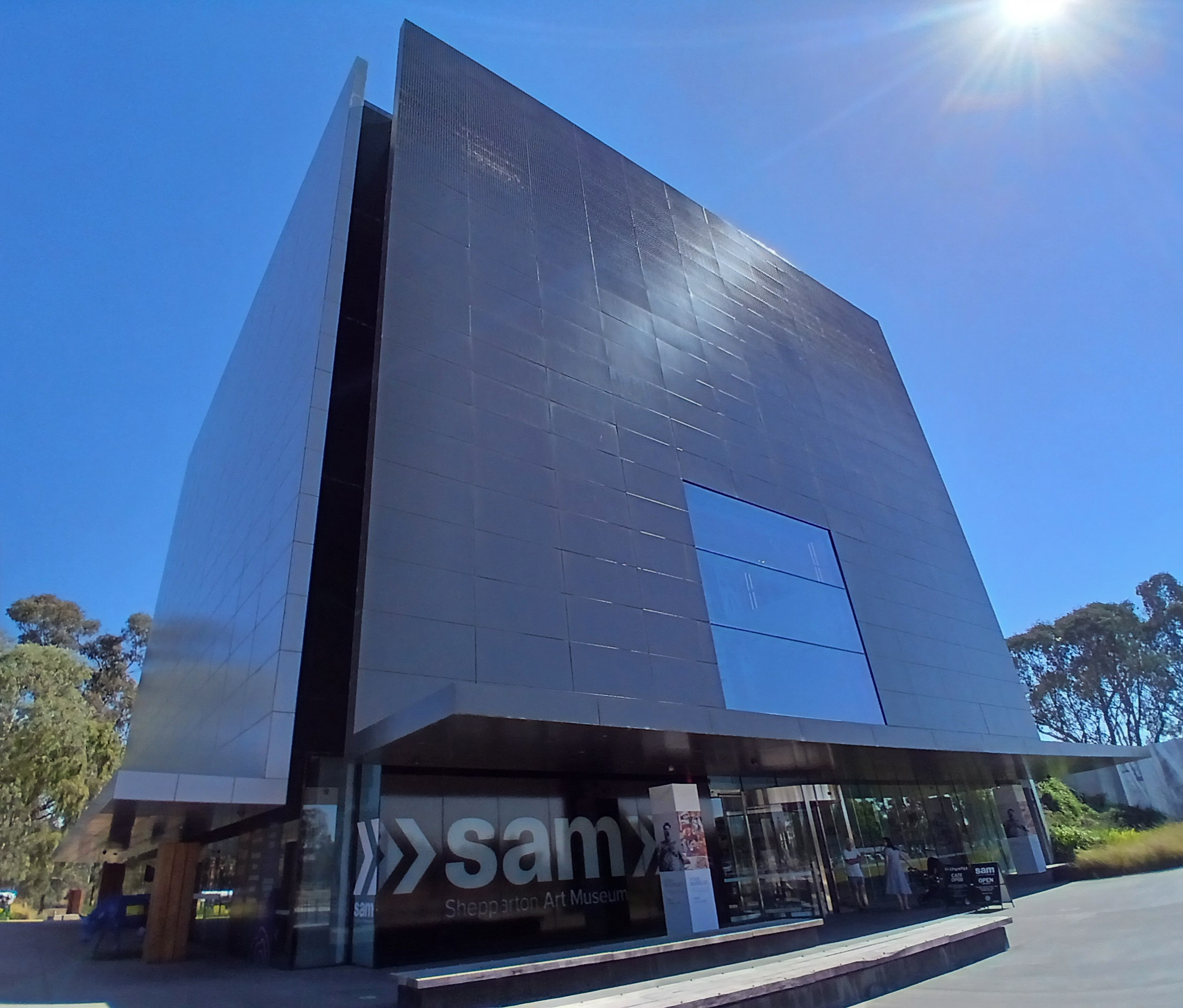
- Front entrance, 2024

- Location within Victoria
- Established: 1936
- Location: 530 Wyndham St, Shepparton, VIC, Australia
- Coordinates: 36.377488°S 145.398188°E
- Type: Art museum
- Collections: Ceramic art
- Directors: Danny Lacy, Artistic Director; Andrew Gooley, Director of Business
- Website: sheppartonartmuseum.com.au

The Shepparton Art Museum (SAM) is an art museum in Shepparton, Victoria, Australia. Established in 1936 as the Shepparton Art Gallery, the collection lacked a purpose-built gallery until the current $50 million building opened in 2021. SAM holds over 4,000 artworks, including one of the largest ceramic art collections in Australia. The building also hosts the Greater Shepparton Visitor Centre; Kaiela Arts, a studio for Aboriginal artists; an outdoor amphitheatre and the Art Hill café.

== Description ==
SAM holds one of Australia's most significant collections of Australian ceramics and Indigenous Australian art. The museum has one of the largest collections of works by the extended Namatjira family (including Albert Namatjira and Vincent Namatjira) and ceramics by Merric Boyd. It is host to the Sidney Myer Fund Australian Ceramic Award (SMFACA) and the Indigenous Ceramic Art Award.

Previously managed by the City of Greater Shepparton, the museum is now governed by the non-profit organisation Shepparton Art Museum Ltd (SAM Ltd).

== Redevelopment ==
In 2013, the SAM Foundation was established to raise funds for a new building. In 2017, a design by Denton Corker Marshall won the architectural design competition for a new Shepparton Art Museum building.

The building design won the Victorian Architecture Award for Public Architecture in 2022, and was the first Australian gallery or museum to be awarded a 6 Star Green Star Rating.

Construction on the $50 million new building commenced in 2019 and opened in November 2021.

== Past exhibitions ==
- Yorta Yorta artist Lin Onus – The Land Within (2021)
- Maree Clarke –Connection to Country – I Remember When...: Stories From Elders About Their Connection to Country, Culture, and Place (2021)
- Flow: Stories of River, Earth and Sky in the SAM Collection (2021)
- Amrita Hepi – A Call to Echo (2021) exhibition for SAM Kids
- Melbourne-based Pakistani artist Nusra Latif Qureshi – The Land I See Is Not Elsewhere (2022)
- Vera Möller – Liquidarium (2022) exhibition for SAM Kids
- Ponch Hawkes – 500 Strong (2022)
