= Murray Griffin =

Australian artist (1903–1992)

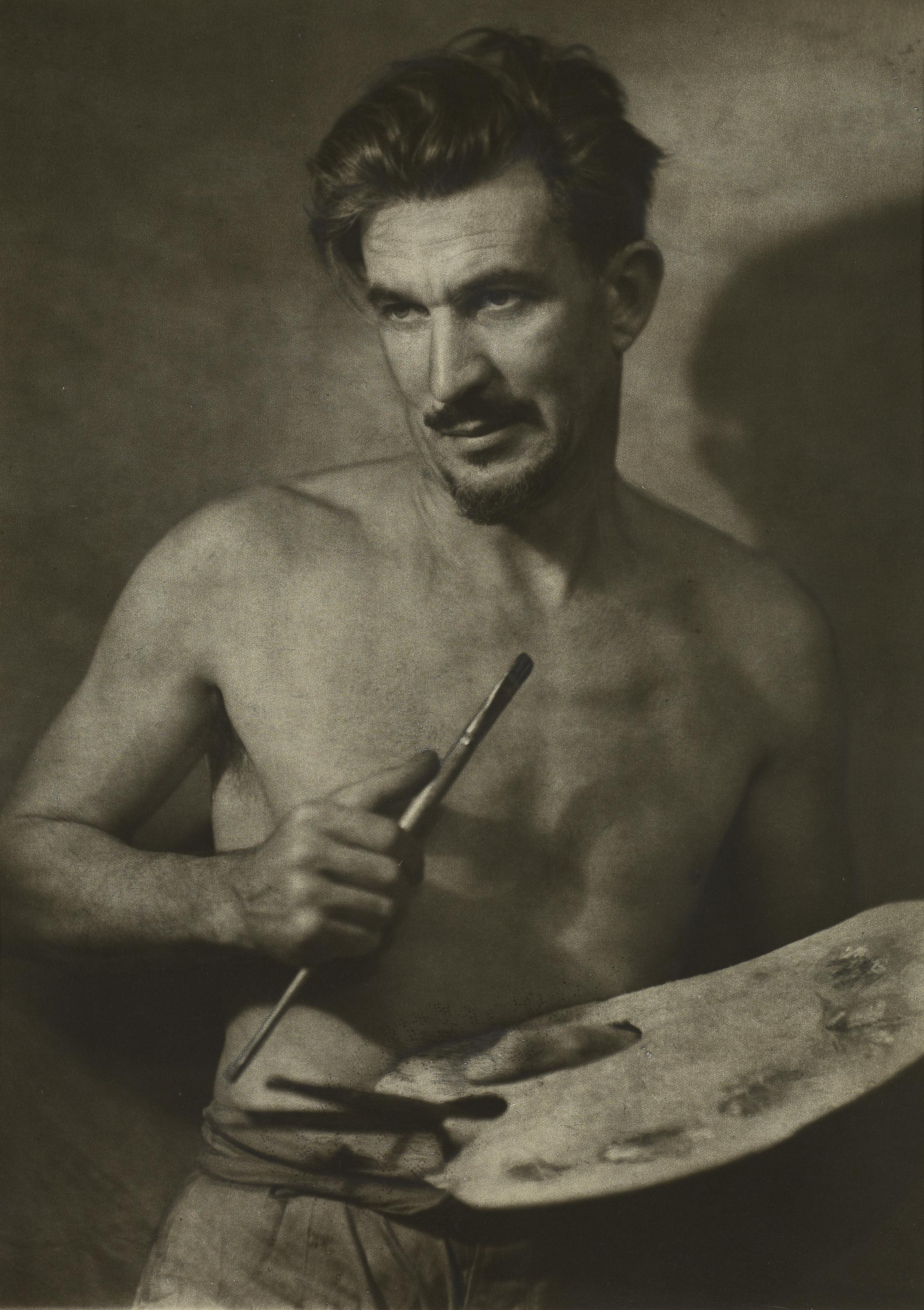
- A portrait of Captain Murray Griffin, c. 1946, by Dr Julian Smith
- Born: Vaughan Murray Griffin; 11 November 1903; Malvern, Melbourne, Victoria, Australia
- Died: 29 January 1992 (aged 88); Heidelberg, Melbourne, Victoria
- Resting place: Templestowe cemetery
- Education: Scotch College, Melbourne; National Gallery of Victoria Art School
- Known for: Landscape and portrait paintings; Printmaking; War artist; Prisoner of war
- Spouse(s): Norrie Hinemoa, née Grist (m. 1932; dec'd. 1980)
- Children: 2 sons
- Parents: Vaughan Gale Griffin (father); Ethel Maude Mary, née Brazier (mother)
- Awards: George Crouch Prize (1935); F. E. Richardson Prize (1939); Maude Vizard-Wholohan Prize (1957)
- Military career
- Allegiance: Australia
- Branch: 2nd AIF (Army)
- Service years: 1941–1945
- Rank: Captain
- Service number: B3/58, VX64361
- Unit: 8th Australian Infantry Battalion
- Conflicts: World War II: Malayan campaign (1941–42); Battle of Gemas (1942); Battle of Muar (1942); Fall of Singapore (1942); Changi POW camp (1942–45)

Murray Griffin, born Vaughan Murray Griffin, (11 November 1903 – 29 January 1992) was an Australian print maker and painter. He also was an art teacher, and, during World War II, was an Australian war artist and a prisoner of war.

== Background and early years ==
Griffin was born in Malvern, a suburb of Melbourne, Victoria, Australia. His parents were Vaughan Gale Griffin and Ethel Maude Mary, née Brazier. Educated at Adwalton Preparatory School for Boys and Scotch College in Melbourne, Griffin trained at the National Gallery of Victoria Art School from 1919 to 1923.

In 1932, Griffin married Norrie Hinemoa Grist and they lived, until 1939, in the Murray Griffin house, located at 52 Darebin Street in Heidelberg, designed for his parents by Walter Burley Griffin, possibly with his wife, Marion. Walter and Marion Griffins also designed Canberra and were unrelated to Vaughan or Murray Griffin, despite sharing the same family name. In 1939, Murray and Norrie purchased the Lippincott house in Eaglemont, designed by Roy Lippincott and his brother-in-law, Walter and Marion Griffin.

== Career ==
Influenced by the Austrian artist Norbertine Bresslern-Roth during the 1930s, Griffin gained a reputation as ‘one of Melbourne’s most innovative modernist printmakers'. He taught art at Scotch College from 1936 to 1937, and drawing and teaching at RMIT from 1937 to 1940. Murray Griffin produced an extensive body of landscape paintings as well as portraits, and he is best known for his printmaking, where he was heavily influenced by Japanese woodcuts. A number of his prints held by the National Gallery of Australia.

=== War service ===
During World War II, in 1941 Griffin was appointed as an official war artist to work with the 8th Australian Division in Malaya. During his three months' service in Malaya, until November 1941, he completed pictures which were prepared for transport to Australia; however, they did not leave the country and were lost through bombing. Following the fall of Singapore in February 1942, Griffin was captured by the Japanese and incarcerated for three and a half years as a prisoner of war in Changi Prison, in conditions slightly less harsh than many other Japanese camps. Whilst he was interned, his work was exhibited at the Hawthorn Library, in 1943, in a group show of ninety-one paintings and etchings with Arnold Shore, Max Meldrum, John Rowell, Jas. Quinn, John Farmer, Mary Hurry, Dora Serle, Margaret Pestell, Dora Wilson, Isabel Tweddle, Aileen Dent, Allan Jordan, Geo. Colville, and Victor Cog.

At the end of 1943, the first survivors of the Burma-Thailand railway returned to Changi and Griffin was shocked by their diseased and emaciated condition. His work changed from being optimistic records of camp life, to visual documents of atrocities and death.

During his imprisonment he made a series of drawings recording his experiences and he exhibited them on his return. The Australian War Memorial holds an extensive collection of this work, and in the 2007 exhibition Paintings, Drawings and Sculpture by Australian Official War Artists 1943-44 a note explained that his self-portrait was "the only work of Murray Griffin that can be shown." Released after the Japanese surrender in September 1945, Griffin accompanied an official party to determine the fate of other prisoners of war before being repatriated in October and employed in the Military History Section, Melbourne. His Changi images, exhibited at the NGV in October 1946 prior to a national tour, won praise for creating ‘great beauty out of scenes of death and horror’. Others found them overly gruesome, including the head of the section, J. L. Treloar, who had blocked their publication in July.

Describing his style, Griffin wrote:

"My drawings were done as simple recordings of facts. Here I believe that an artist can, by what he leaves out, point very directly and convincingly to an activity. His mind acts as a sieve, forbidding the irrelevant."

— Murray Griffin, n.d.

=== Post-war artistic career ===
From 1946 to 1953 he was a teacher of drawing at the National Gallery of Victoria Art School and then returned to RMIT was a senior lecturer in art from 1954 to 1968. During these periods, Griffin became known for his colour prints of birds and animals. He devoted spare time to his own art practice and exhibited at the Art Gallery of South Australia where he won the print section of the Maude Vizard-Wholohan Prize in 1957. Griffin spent most of his latter life living in the Eaglemont and Heidelberg areas of Melbourne, although he also travelled around country Victoria to paint and draw.

Griffin was influenced by Anthroposophy and the teachings of Rudolf Steiner. This passion resulted in a body of oil paintings and linocuts known as the Journey Series, held by the La Trobe University.

Following the death of his wife in 1980, Griffin died of pneumonia on 29 January 1992 at West Heidelberg and was buried in the Templestowe cemetery, survived by his two sons. (Note: Although, The Age in 2023 mentioned that Griffin's son, Murray, junior, had Penny, Julia and Kate as siblings.)

== Legacy ==
A memoir of his wartime experiences was published in 1992. Posthumous exhibitions were held at the Castlemaine Art Gallery (2001) and the Australian War Memorial, Canberra (2017).

His works are held in many national and state collections, notably the National Gallery of Australia, the Australian War Memorial, the National Gallery of Victoria, the State Library of Victoria, the Art Gallery of South Australia, and the Queensland Art Gallery/Queensland Gallery of Modern Art; and in regional galleries including those of Ballarat, Castlemaine, Geelong, Newcastle, and Warrnambool. Collections are also held by the Print Council of Australia, The Ian Potter Museum of Art and the Victorian College of the Arts at The University of Melbourne, the La Trobe University, the Federation University, the Australian Embassy in Washington, D.C., and the Shrine of Remembrance, in Melbourne.

Among his commissioned works were murals at the National Museum of Victoria (1952) and at Mac.Robertson Girls' High School (1954), and a portrait of Sir Edward (Weary) Dunlop (1956), with the latter held at the Australian War Memorial.

=== Prizes and awards ===
Amongst his notable prizes and awards were:

- 1923 — First prizes National Gallery School for Painting and Landscape painting
- 1935 — Crouch prize for the oil painting Golden Barriers
- 1939 — F. E. Richardson prize for the linocut Spoonbill
- 1952 — Dunlop Prize (joint 2nd) for the oil painting Warrior
- 1957 — Maude Vizard-Wholohan Prize: Art Gallery of South Australia for the linocut Bird of Paradise
- 1976 — Henri Worland Memorial Art Prize: Warrnambool Art gallery for the linocut Duck in Reeds
- 1990 — Victorian Artists Society Honour Medal for "outstanding contributions to art"
