= Ian Armstrong (artist) =

Australian artist (1923-2005)

- Born: 30 December 1923; Malvern, Melbourne, Australia
- Died: 2005
- Education: Royal Melbourne Institute of Technology; National Gallery School
- Movement: Classical modernism
- Spouse: Kathleen Parker
- Awards: Commonwealth Jubilee Travelling Scholarship, James Farrell Self Portrait Award, Visual Arts Board Overseas Grant

Ian Armstrong (30 December 1923 – 2005) was an Australian artist. He was a classical modernist painter and print maker.

== Early life ==
Armstrong was born in the Melbourne suburb of Malvern. He left school at the age of thirteen and started his working life as a grocer boy. Later, he joined his father at James Flood Motor Body Builders and worked as a blacksmith. In 1940, he enrolled at the Royal Melbourne Institute of Technology studying three nights a week and Saturday morning. By 1943 he had commenced evening classes at the National Gallery School which he continued until 1950. Looking for more rigorous tuition, he joined the George Bell School, where he studied intermittently from 1945 to 1949.

Bell was a strong disciplinarian. Armstrong acknowledges that Bell taught him "everything that was worth anything". To escape the rigorous discipline of Bell and the more conservative teachings of the Gallery school, Armstrong and fellow students [Fred Williams] and Harry Rosengrave purchased a block of land at Lilydale. The "Block" was a place away from the constraints of the city, where almost every weekend for the next five years was spent painting in the open air. Paintings from this period were exhibited at the Stanley Cove Gallery in 1951.

== In education ==
In 1951, Armstrong controversially shared the Commonwealth Jubilee Travelling Scholarship with Michelle Wunderlich to the Slade School in London. During his time at the Slade an introduction to printmaking led to classes in etching and lithography - media he has excelled in ever since. On the return journey to Australia he met Kathleen Parker. They married in Melbourne in 1954.

In 1960 Armstrong was appointed Drawing Master at the National Gallery School, teaching alongside John Brack and Marc Clarke. Many of his Gallery students have developed notable careers of their own. In 1966 Armstrong resigned from the National Gallery School commencing a full-time painting career which he continued for the rest of his life, supplemented with intermittent teaching at the C.A.E and private classes at his home studio in Blackburn.

== Awards ==
- 1991 James Farrell Self Portrait Award, Castlemaine Art Gallery and Historical Museum
- 1988 Australia Council, Visual Arts Board Overseas Grant. Residency studio Cite Internationale des Arts, Paris
- 1984 Victor Harbour Art Award
- 1983 Swan Hill Pioneer Art Award, Swan Hill Regional Art Gallery
- 1974 Australia Council, Visual Arts Board Grant
- 1973 Rockhampton Prize, Rockhampton Art Gallery
- 1971 Roland Prize, Latrobe Regional Gallery, Morwell
- 1968 W.G.Dean Prize, Victorian Artists Society
- 1964 George Crouch Prize, Ballarat Fine Art Gallery
- 1954 Aubrey Gibson Prize, Victorian Artists Society
- 1951 Commonwealth Jubilee Travelling Scholarship, N.S.W.
- 1950 F.E.Richardson Watercolour Prize, Geelong Art Gallery

== Later life ==
Armstrong was a respected portraitist, mostly painting artist friends and family as the subjects. In 1965 the Australia Galleries in Collingwood exhibited Twelve Portraits by Ian Armstrong, which included the striking full-length portrait, David Lawrence 1965, acquired by the National Gallery of Victoria and Helen Brack 1965, acquired by State Library of Victoria. "In each of these paintings Armstrong relies not only on the face to describe character, but also the entire pose."

In the early 1970s, after suffering ill health and needing a change, Armstrong and his family moved to Wedderburn in central Victoria for a year, to paint the landscape and recover his health. His landscapes and portraits from this time have been exhibited widely and are represented in many regional galleries and private collections. In 1974 a grant awarded by the Visual Arts Board, Australia Council, led to a series of large portraits of family and friends. A trip to France and Spain in 1977 produced many prints and drawings.

At a show in Adelaide, Ian met former Gallery School student Mark Pearce. Their rekindled friendship led to a series of joint projects, including decorating pots, exploring sculpture and many painting trips including time in the Flinders Ranges. During this time Armstrong developed a great love of the South Australian landscape.

The 1980s involved building a mud brick house near Maryborough, central Victorian landscape painting, and more overseas travel. A trip to England and France on an Australia Council grant in 1988 led to three months study and work in Paris, based at the Cite International des Arts.

In 1990, Armstrong sold the family home in Blackburn, and he and Kath moved to Anglesea. The next ten years were spent painting the local land and seascapes, with trips further afield to Mark Pearce's Bungala, South Australia studio. Landscape painting En plein air was a passion that Armstrong followed for over 60 overs; during the 1990s he joined Rick Amor and others to form the 500 Friday Group. In 1999 he completed a painting trip to Central Australia with John and Renee Dent.
