= Ada May Plante =

New Zealand born Australian painter

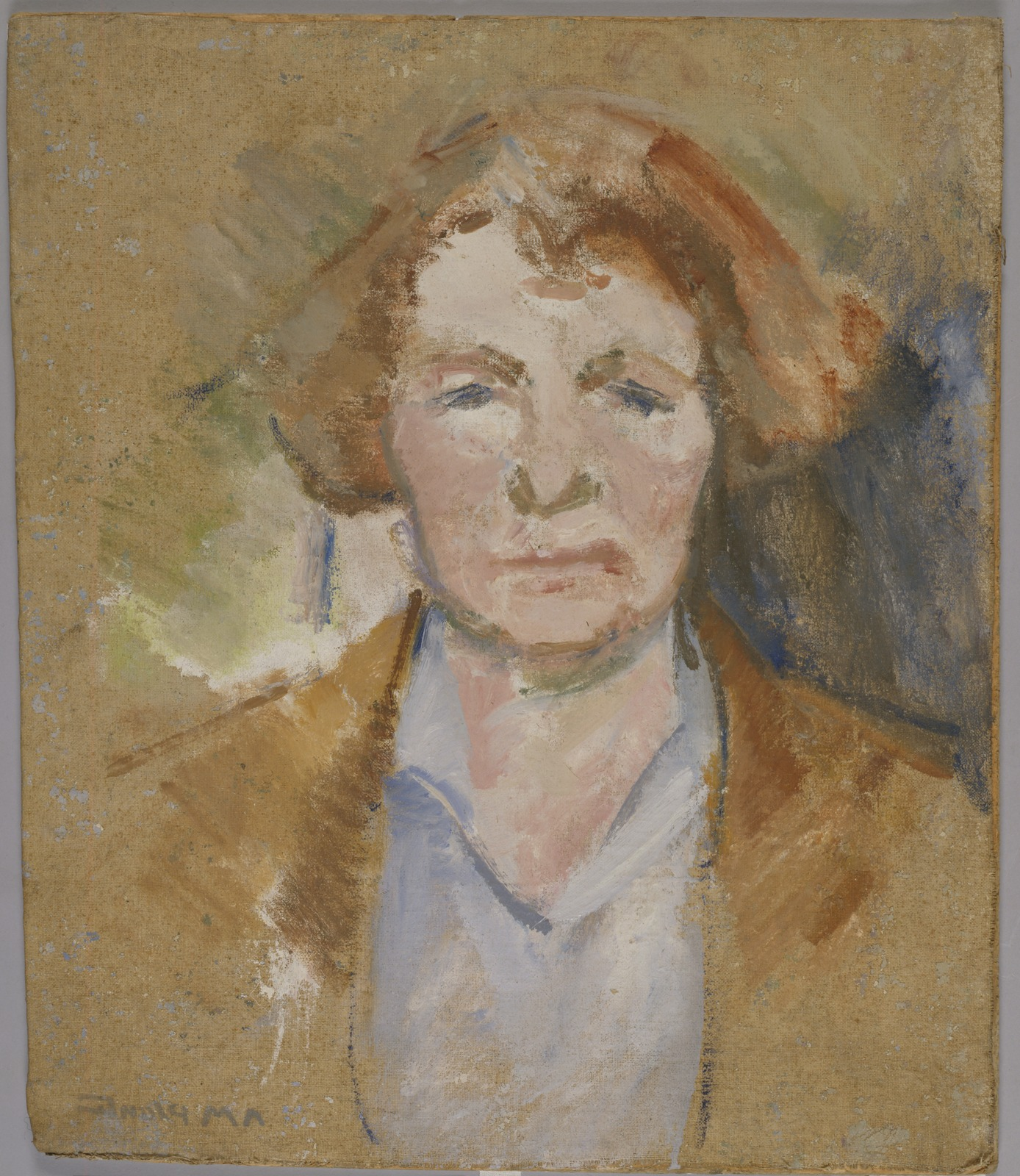
- Born: Ada May Plante; 4 October 1875; Temuka, New Zealand
- Died: 3 July 1950 (aged 75); Melbourne, Australia
- Education: Presbyterian Ladies' College, Melbourne; National Gallery of Victoria Art School
- Known for: Painting
- Movement: Post-Impressionism

Ada May Plante (4 October 1875 – 3 July 1950) was an Australian Post-Impressionist artist who was one of the founding exhibitors in the Post-Impressionist Melbourne Contemporary Group. She was a member of the Melbourne Society of Women Painters and Sculptors.

== Early life and family ==
Ada May Plante was born on 4 October 1875 in Temuka, New Zealand. Her parents had immigrated from England and her father, Thomas Crowther Plante, worked as a merchant. Her mother was Isabella Plante, née Guthrie. The family moved to Australia in 1888, settling in East Melbourne where Plante was enrolled at the Presbyterian Ladies' College in 1891. She received formal training at the National Gallery School from Lindsay Bernard Hall and Frederick McCubbin.

== Career ==
Her first exhibition was with the Victorian Artists Society in 1901.

In 1902 she moved to Paris to study at Académie Julian, sharing a studio with Australian artist Cristina Asquith Baker. She exhibited her work from the academy after her return to Australia at the Victorian Artists Society. In 1907 she exhibited in the First Australian Exhibition of Women's Work which earned her prizes for portrait and figure painting.

In 1932 she exhibited her work in the first exhibition of the Melbourne Contemporary Art Group. She exhibited with the Contemporary Art Society in 1941 and 1943 and had her only solo exhibition at George's Gallery in 1945.

Throughout her life she lived in houses that she shared with other artists, allowing her to come into contact with many artists and be exposed to different ideas. While the beginning of her career saw her painting in an impressionist style similar to James Abbott McNeill Whistler, she was later able to master the post-impressionist style through encouragement from artists such as William Frater and Lina Bryans with whom she lived in an artists' colony in "The Pink Hotel" at Darebin. She earned critical acclaim from Basil Burdett (1897–1942) for her post-impressionist work.

Following her death in Melbourne on 3 July 1950, a memorial exhibition was held at the Stanley Coe Gallery in that city.
