= Gino Nibbi =

Italian Australian author, art critic and bookseller (1896–1969)

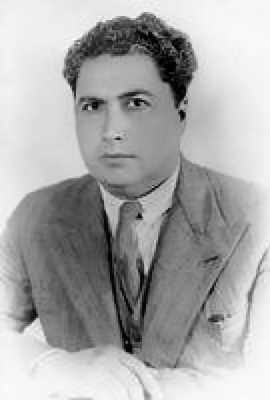
- Born: April 29, 1896; Fermo
- Died: December 17, 1969 (aged 73); Grottaferrata
- Burial place: Cimitero comunale di Porto San Giorgio; 43.16289°N 13.80009°E
- Citizenship: naturalised Australian
- Education: Accountancy
- Occupations: author, art critic and bookseller
- Years active: 1919-1969
- Known for: Leonardo Art Shop, Melbourne
- Spouse: Elvira (née Petrelli)
- Parent(s): Anna (née Spinelli) and Pasquale Nibbi

Gino Nibbi (1896–1969) was an Italian-born naturalised Australian author, art critic, gallerist, intellectual, and bookseller in Australia and Italy, who helped educate and connect Melbourne modernist artists and their public.

== Early life ==
Nibbi was born on 29 April 1896 in Fermo, Italy, to Anna (née Spinelli) and Pasquale Nibbi, a cooper. They moved to nearby Porto San Giorgio, also in Fermo province on the Adriatic Sea. There, Gino completed studies in accountancy at the Technical Institute of Ascoli Piceno on 2 September 1915. Serving in artillery as a lieutenant in World War I he was decorated for bravery, but the experience convinced him to become a pacifist. Post-war he kept accounts for an agricultural cooperative in Fermo then for a pasta factory Società Molini e Pastifici, in Porto San Giorgio, where on 3 April 1922 he married schoolteacher Elvira Petrelli whose father was a painter, a copyist of old masters. Nibbi's own interest in contemporary art developed through his friendship, from 1920, with the painter and Fermo art teacher Osvaldo Licini who in Paris had met Picasso, Cocteau, Modigliani and Cendrars and exhibited with Kandinsky, and who drew Nibbi to the French avant-garde, an interest shared by another friend Acruto Vitali.

Palmer associates Nibbi with other expatriates Yosl Bergner, Danila Vassilieff, Peter Herbst, Gerd Buchdahl, Franz Philipp and Ursula Hoff, whose ‘ordeals in Fascist and Nazi Europe…manifested in their relocation to Australia.’ Haese is more specific: '[Nibbi's] reasons for migrating were to do with both politics and art. Mussolini's accession to power was a factor in prompting the move, since Nibbi had been a fervent supporter of the Italian Republican Party, with its strong liberal tradition of anti-clericalism, anti-monarchism and anti-fascism.' Nibbi's friend Licini was jailed for his protests against the fascists, and Nibbi obtained authorisation to emigrate only through the intervention of journalist Margherita Sarfatti. Artieri confuses Gino Nibbi with Gino Bibbi, an 'individualist anarchist' implicated in assisting Gino Lucetti's attempted assassination of Mussolini in 1926. As a pacifist, Nibbi was, in September 1939, a signatory on an open letter of thanks to Mussolini for declaring Italy neutral, though 9 months later Il Duce joined the Axis in WW2 and declared war on the Allies.

Before leaving Italy Nibbi edited the anti-Marinettian Futurist and Dadaist Le Pagine during its short life 1916–1917, and was a regular contributor in the 1920s to La Fiera Letteraria, the Italian magazine of letters, sciences and arts (later titled, in Rome, l'Italia Letteraria).

== Australia and the Pacific ==
In 1926 Nibbi emigrated to Melbourne, followed by his family in 1927. From thence during 1931-2 he undertook a pilgrimage to Tahiti and the Society Islands pursuing his interest in Paul Gauguin's life in the South Pacific, seeking 'memories [of Gauguin] surviving among the people,’ and writing about his discoveries for a number of Italian newspapers, as well as for the Herald, and about Ra'latea in the Leeward Islands (Polynesia), and Tasmania's picturesque delights for L'Illustrazione Italiana.

With Italian publishers the results appeared in The Islands of Happiness (Milan, 1934). Il Giornale Italiano of Sydney quoted the reception of his book by Quadrivio, the literary weekly of Rome of 8 July 1934; 'his observations do not stop at the surface, and also because the journey is very rich in details. With a style rich in different tones, the author now describes the wonderful landscapes of those islands not wrongly called "of happiness"; now instead, even if briefly, or almost in passing, gives news of a historical or geographical and economic nature (without being cloying), now he tries to penetrate the soul of the natives of those strange countries, perfectly managing to give us an exact sensation of their linear psychology; Il Giornale cites also comments in the Roman fortnightly magazine Augustea of 15 July 1934: 'He is a "personal" narrator, who, while observing minutely, gives a certain fairy-tale feel to his page, which one might say is a little hallucinatory, even when it is seasoned with a skeptical realism. This is not the classic "travel book", it is a kind of confession that the author makes of himself after his experiences there.' Milan's L'Ambrosiano rated the volume among the three best of the month.

== Leonardo Art Shop ==
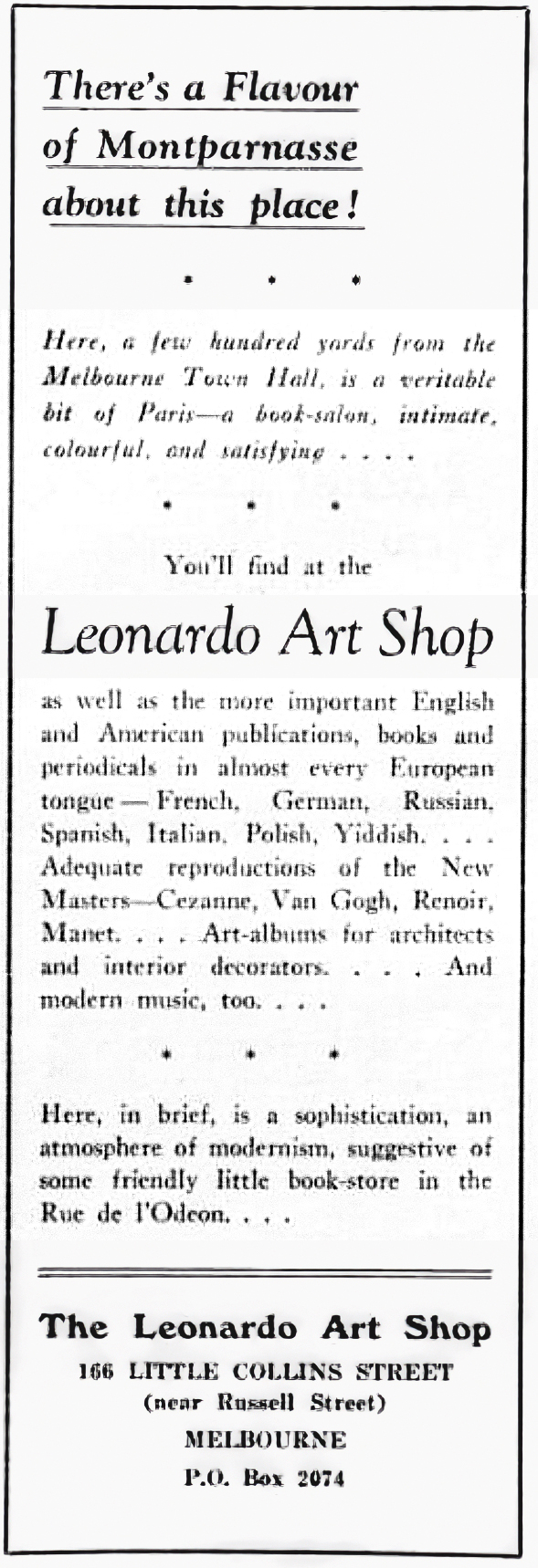
Advertisement for the Leonardo Art Shop in 'Stream' 2 August 1931

Returning to Melbourne in 1928 he established, as Sendy notes, at 166 Little Collins Street, near the corner of Exhibition Street, close to the famous Victoria Coffee Palace and a few doors from F. W. Cheshire's, an avant-garde literary and art shop, his Leonardo Art Shop. O'Grady places it 'at 170 Little Collins Street, behind George's department store.' Meanwhile, Elvira taught Italian at the Melbourne Conservatorium of Music and the Berlitz School of Languages.

The shop was advertised in 1931 as:

...a veritable bit of Paris—a book-salon, intimate, colourful, and satisfying. You’ll find at the Leonardo Art Shop, as well as the more important English and American publications, books and periodicals in almost every European tongue French, German, Russian, Spanish, Italian, Polish, Yiddish—Adequate reproductions of the New Masters—Cezanne, Van Gogh, Renoir, Manet—Art-albums for architects and interior decorators—and modern music, too. Here, in brief, is a sophistication, an atmosphere of modernism, suggestive of some friendly little book-store in the Rue de I’Odeon.

Rees declares that:

the Leonardo Art Shop...inspired a generation of young artists to create a homegrown avant-garde...' in the inter-war decades which 'were the heyday of the White Australia policy...with little diversity and few outside influences, Melbourne was a staid and conservative city, suspicious of new ideas that might challenge the status quo. [Its] conservatism manifested as a fierce antagonism towards the modernist aesthetics revolutionising art in Europe. Picasso, Matisse, Cezanne, Gauguin – artists we now revere as visionaries – were dismissed by Australian critics as degenerates whose abstracted and expressionist forms threatened the principles of academic painting.

Nibbi was a vehement supporter of modern art and was close to Giorgio de Chirico and Amedeo Modigliani. He imported and sold postcards; magazines including in 1931 the radical magazine Stream, the publishing address of which was his shop, and for which he wrote on modern art; plays and poetry by Melbourne authors; and books in various languages, on European modernism; as well as the quality poster prints of Post-Impressionist works published by Piper in Munich; all being superior to the reproductions previously seen by his customers who included Clarice Beckett, Len Crawford, Russell Drysdale, Albert Tucker, Arthur Boyd, John Perceval, Ian Fairweather, Eric Thake, and Donald Friend. Writer Alister Kershaw declared it 'the most enchanting bookshop in the world', while Len Crawford valued Nibbi's advice and opinions on his early painting efforts. Many who were struggling financially and could not purchase his glossy art books appreciated Nibbi allowing, and encouraging, them to browse the shelves.

These young Australian artists, despite their geographical isolation from Europe, were thereby exposed to innovators of modernism, and in the bookshop they would encounter each other. Fairweather had left Bali for Melbourne early in 1934 and was quickly oriented to the Antipodean scene when Nibbi, who recognised his unique talent, introduced him to George Bell, 'Jock' Frater, Arnold Shore and others. Tucker noted that "he went out of his way to import a whole lot of the postcard prints, cheap reproductions and better quality reproductions and books covering the contemporary movement …" Harding notes that it was Nibbi in the early 1940s who introduced Tucker to the expressionism of Edvard Munch, which led him to the Germans Max Beckmann, Otto Dix and George Grosz.

Vic O’Connor recalled to Barbara Blackman his dawning teenage interest in art when in about 1932 he would ‘spend a couple of hours in Gino Nibbi's bookshop, [to] read books [and] look at pictures or talk to Gino Nibbi,’ ‘there was no other bookshop in Melbourne like it,’ and that next door was Riddell furniture shop and gallery with exhibitions of Arnold Shore and Danila Vassilieff. O’Connor describes Nibbi's friendliness and his:

'inquiring mind, he was an interesting man and he…was a great talker, …stoutish and great wavy Italian brown hair and huge milky brown eyes, and wonderful operatic gestures. He could've been singing any of the Puccini operas when he talked to you….he was very conservative politically but he had this wonderful love of culture and he lived it. I remember him telling me…what he was reading.

Nibbi would invite O’Connor to his home, a modest weatherboard terrace-house at 4 Kooyong-Koot Road, Hawthorn where he had original artworks; ‘a nice Chirico [his late Horses on the Beach, a gift of the artist] some paintings by Gino Severini, the Italian cubist, a Carlo Carrà, and he had a Kisling, Moïse Kisling…’ De Chirico's intrigue with distant, melancholic Melbourne, mentioned early in his 1929 Hebdomeros, was piqued when his friend Nibbi sent him a postcard of the city's Italianate Treasury Building.

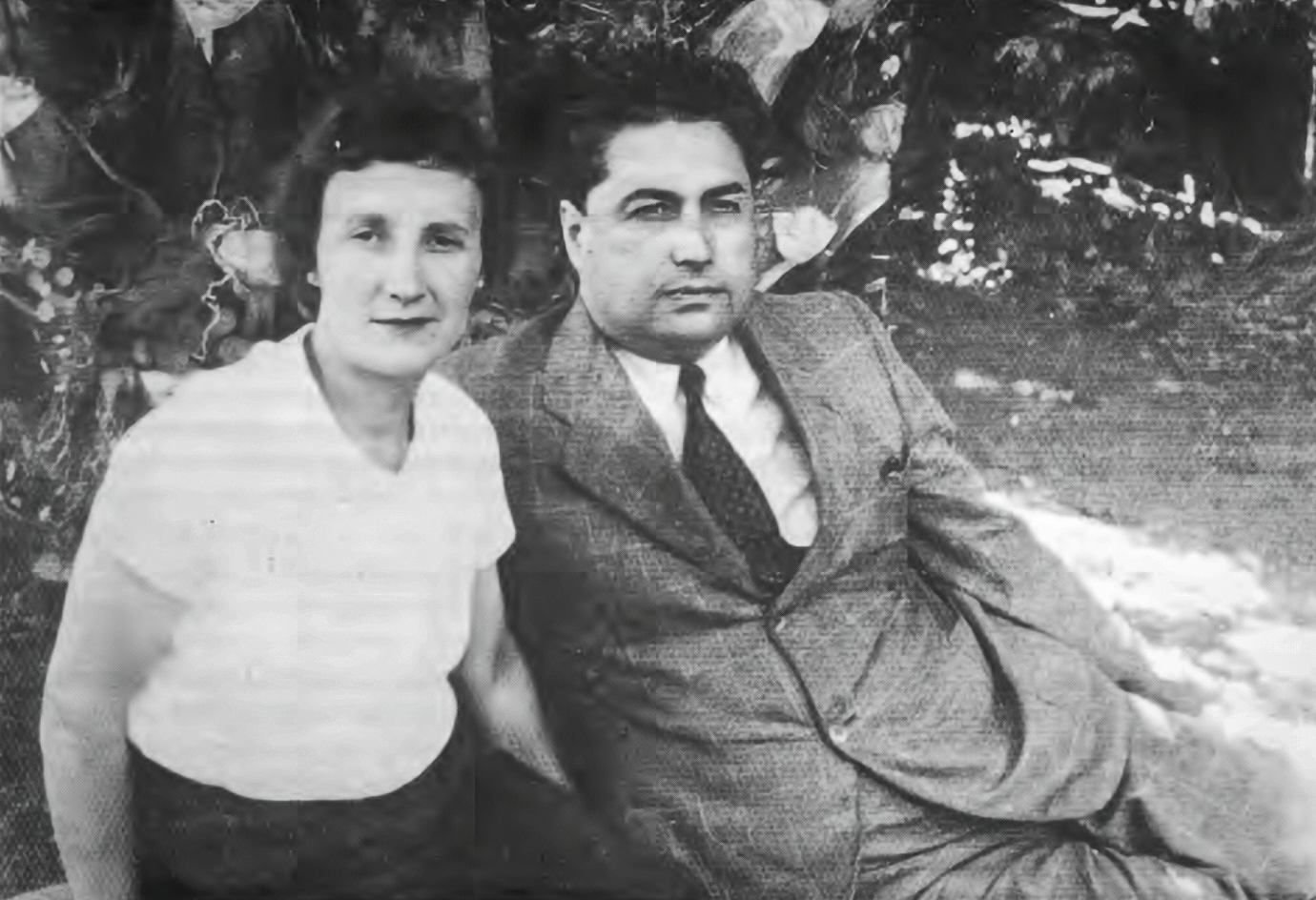
Elvira and Gino Nibbi in Melbourne, 1937

An enthusiastic promoter of Italian culture, for the Australian Broadcasting Commission, Nibbi occasionally presented ‘The Art of Italy’ on radio from September 1933, then from January 1934 until February 1936 spoke on ‘The Italian Language’ in weekly programs from which he generated Gino’s Newest Italian-English Reader (Melbourne, 1936). He also lectured on Italian literature, giving at one Societa Dante Alighieri event a commemorative lecture (with an English synopsis for Australian attendees) on Italian poet and writer, Gabriel d'Annunzio, and at another, lectured on the early Italian novel, Alessandro Manzoni's I promessi sposi ('The Betrothed') and its contemporary setting of the plague epidemic of 1629-31.

The couple traveled to Italy on the SS Pierre Loti for the launch of Nibbi's short stories Il Volto degli Emigranti (Florence, 1937), thirteen accounts by Italian migrants gathered in Melbourne and further afield amongst cane cutters in Queensland. Generously, he had advertised that he would be leaving for Italy on December 15, 1936, to ‘visit the principal cities of Italy for business reasons, and ... is in a position to take an interest in business of various kinds, especially those which may concern Italian customers.’ En route, in early 1937, they stopped at Gauguin's grave in Hiva Oa in the Marquesas, from whence he wrote an article on the artist's last days. The couple toured Madeira, on which Nibbi wrote a travelogue for the Melbourne Herald, and visited Berlin, then Paris, where he interviewed De Chirico, Brancusi, Zadkine and Kisling for his biography of Modigliani which he announced on his return would be his next book. O'Grady, whose information comes from his interview with Nibbi who was then 70, indicates that it was on that trip that he acquired the paintings by De Chirico, Kisling and Severini mentioned by O'Connor. In October that year he loaned to the New South Wales National Gallery for an exhibition of contemporary European art his Kisling, which Basil Burdett singled out as 'the most representative modern work in the show. It represents the "Back to Ingres" movement of French modernism...a very exquisite small work indeed.'

== Censorship ==
After being asked in 1929 by police to remove an 'offensive' Renoir nude from his window, in February 1930 Nibbi had been fined £20 (equivalent to more than $1,800 in 2025) for importing an 'obscene' book; then returning from Genoa on the Remo in September 1937, he brought with him 50 colour prints of an Amedeo Modigliani reclining nude, a reproduction commissioned by Nibbi with permission of its owner, and which he sold for 2/- each. In November they were seized by the Customs Department justified because the cheap prints ‘would have a strong appeal for other than the genuine collector…[and] would not be displayed by a discriminating art dealer.’ The Victorian Artists' Society wrote on 24 November to the Minister for Customs to inform him of the resolution of a 'special meeting' they had called over the seizure:

...the members of the Victorian Artists' Society strongly deprecates the action of your Department in reference to the print of a nude by Modigliani. The Council wishes to stress their opinion that the print contains no hint of obscenity nor can it be styled prurient in any way. They wish to bring to your notice that this same picture is included in the well-known book of Modigliani's work. Your Department commented on the "cheap nature of the print". This print is presented in the usual form and no exception can be taken in the Council's view on this ground. Modigliani is renowned throughout the world as a consummate artist in painting of the nude.

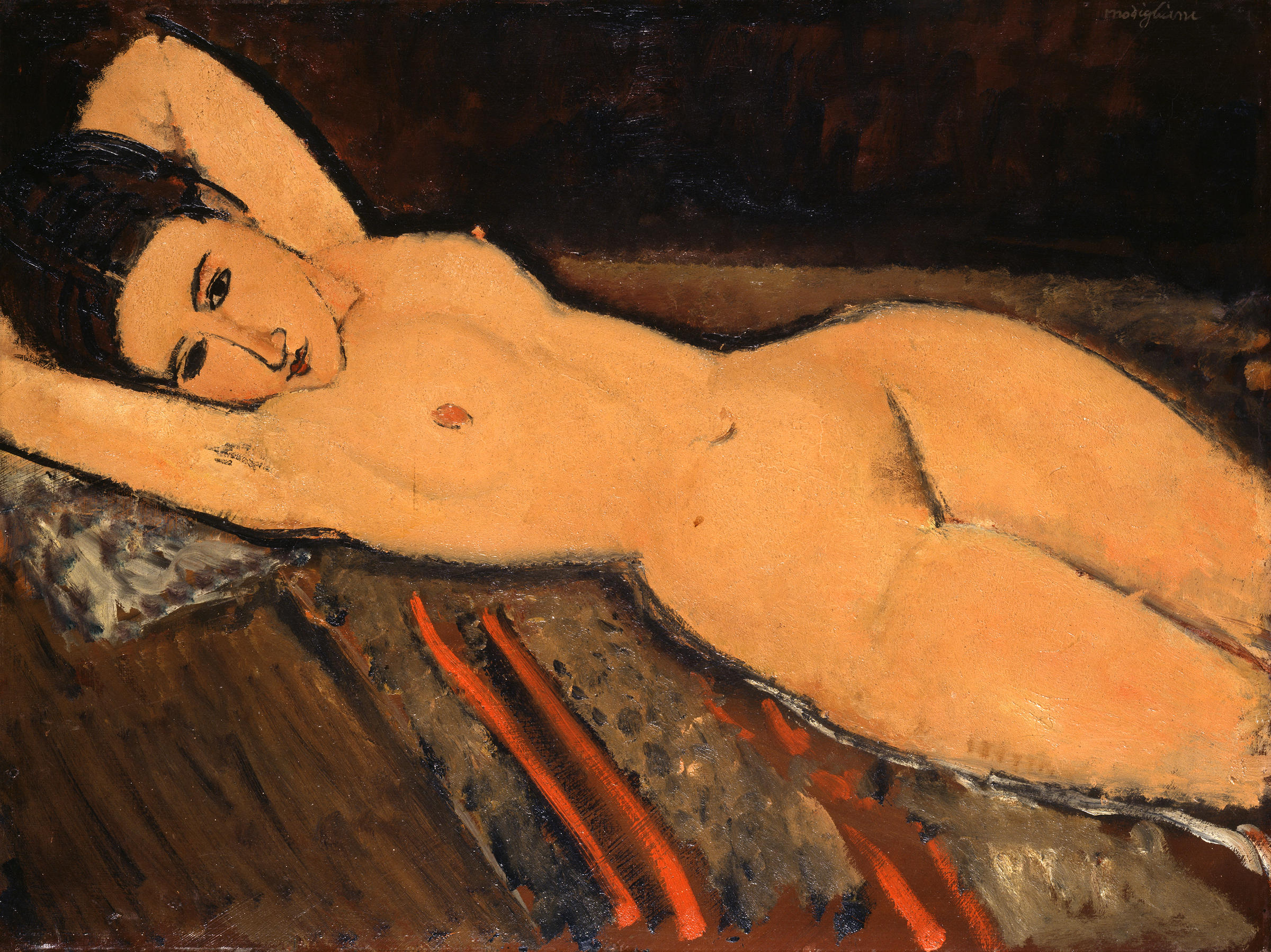
Amedeo Modigliani, 1916, Nu couché, oil on canvas, 65.5 x 87 cm, Foundation E.G. Bührle

The Minister's office was advised by Robert Garran to reply that it 'takes into consideration the nature of the reproduction and the manner' in which it is 'exhibited and sold...In this case the Department tales the view that a crude reproduction, at picture-postcard price would be saleable...not for any artistic merit, but for a conspicuous feature not usually so obtruded in paintings in this country.' Nibbi also appealed, and the story appeared in nearly every Australian newspaper including the regionals', with the effect of boosting the notoriety of his Leonardo Art Shop.

Nibbi took issue, in a December 1939 letter to the editor of the Herald, with the selection of modernist works by National Gallery trustees in which 'distortions of the truth' about their private lives was raised as disqualifying them from the collection.

== Art critic ==
Chanin ventures that Keith Murdoch's December 1931 display 'Modern Masters in Colour Reproduction,' at the assembly-room at his Herald and Weekly Times, of posters of European art, was his response to Nibbi's provocations about the parochialism of Australian art being 'stilted and half-dead,' in his Herald review of the annual exhibition of the Australian Art Association in which he wrote, as quoted by the Brisbane Courier critic William Moore:

"the artists give the impression that they have matured on easy glories tributed to them by the Australian public, which is in its nature enthusiastic. These works, so generical [sic] in quality, are almost totally devoid of personality. We note, for instance, in Mr. L. Bernard Hall's pictures ability irreparably constricted by academic influences, lifeless realities against dead backgrounds. Charles Wheeler appears as an intelligent illustrator, but his manner belongs to our childhood, and is already forgotten. A conventionally treated portrait of a charming lady by W. Beckwith McInnes is only a pale reflection of vitality"

Moore notes Nibbi's observation of Australia artists who were 'studying new problems', and 'discerning citizens" with genuine appreciation of modern art, but also summarised the way Nibbi's views, decried vehemently by many, had supporters like Rah Fizelle and others including Daryl Lindsay and Arnold Shore who at least conceded that the new art had 'been accepted by the majority', or 'could not be denied.' Protesting the incontestable authority of conventional realism most strongly, Moore wrote, was A.M.E. Bale, whom Cézanne could teach 'nothing about the reality of representation', while Jo Sweatman, regarding modernism was a fad of the times, called for its suppression as an evil.

The Herald gave Nibbi a column of over 1,000 words in its 10 December 1931 issue in which he responded that the 'moderns', subject to 'intense critical passion of the last 10 years', were no longer a 'vogue' but were 'more than ever the centre of universal interest'. Cézanne, Gauguin, Van Gogh, De Chirico, Utrillo, Derain, Dufy, Segonzac, Braque, Rouault, Gromaire, Kisling and Lurcat, were visionary inheritors of the 'unique intuitions,' 'faithful to their times' of Giotto, El Greco, Tintoretto, and Rembrandt, in their 'painting, for instance, a face, not as we believe we see it, but painting the emotion that gives us that particular face. Avoiding on one hand the platitude of color photography, and on the other the deceitful reproduction of objects which results in the cold and conventional appearance of a fictitious entity.'

Naturalised in February 1939, in 1938 Nibbi had been a founding member and treasurer, and in 1941 was elected lay vice-president, of the Melbourne branch of the Contemporary Art Society of Australia, formed after discussions in his bookshop, to counter Menzies' conservative Australian Academy of Art. Art in Australia profiled him in a foreword to his article 'Ideas Behind Contemporary Art', in which he discusses the C.A.S. exhibition in June at the McAllen Gallery of the National Museum of Victoria which showcased the group's diverse talents.

Signor Nibbi is of Italian birth; but he has lived for many years in Melbourne. His Leonardo Book Shop has done much to familiarse the public with contemporary art through reproductions and literature. He is closely in touch with the latest developments, both here and abroad. In this article, he sets out to probe and penetrate into the ideas which have animated various prominent members of the Contemporary Art Society.

In this representative sample of his discerning critiques thus introduced, he addresses the embrace of modernism by the exhibitors, in some detail: Russell Drysdale's combining of cubism and realism in 'vivid, plastic relief'; 'delicate, unreal atmospheres' in Eric Thake's abstract fantasies; Albert Tucker's struggles with his rigid colour application in his advance towards abstraction; 'magical and disturbing imagery' in James Gleeson's Dali-influenced surrealism. He details how sculptor Clive Stephen 'excavates' material to 'free it from some secret'; discovers a 'controlled sobriety' and balance in David Strachan's 'debut' in cubist still life; admires Erik Dorn's arabesque line and Louise Thomas's 'unusual virility'; praises Purvis Smith as 'one of the most qualified at present to give some allegorical interpretations of the virgin appearances of the Australian land'; expresses disappointment that George Bell, a 'modern experimenter' and main founder of the group was not well-represented in the exhibition; encourages Sali Herman's nascent inventive ventures; and puzzles over Joan Yonge's success in 'producing portraits with such thick and vibrating impastos, and of an inspiration so warm'; remarks that Marjorie North is 'seduced by the cubistic technique'; and admired Edith Hughston's 'head of a girl, whose accent, expressively barbaric, was most effective. Common amongst these artists is their rejection of the academy, he says, and its promotion of a 'mythical' Australian Art, when 'art is inevitably tending to renounce every local peculiar characteristic, to assume the function of an instrument conveying universal significance...a local art could not help appearing provincial, amateurish.' Consequently, he concludes, it is more useful to believe in Australian artists like these, than 'Australian art.'

Amongst other members of the C.A.S. Nibbi contributed a 10-minute talk 'A Few Remarks About Abstract Art' for the public attending the exhibition, and was the announcer of its £50 prize for best exhibit, joint winners; James Gleeson, for We Inhabit the Corrosive Littoral of Habit; and Eric Thake, for Salvation from the Evils of Earthly Existence.

To the second, and penultimate, issue of Cyril Pearl's journal Stream, which he distributed, Nibbi contributed his essay 'Some Modern Masters' surveying French modernists. Not restricting himself to visual arts, he wrote in 1935 on Sicilian playwright Luigi Pirandello for Manuscripts: A Quarterly Of Art And Letters, published by the Bookshop of Margareta Webber, which was effectively a competitor of his own business.

On 30 April 1940 Nibbi promoted the art of Adrian Lawlor at the Atheneum, in opening the show, as; 'one of the few in this country who attempts to maintain creative art on the same levels as that of other nations.' He then presented in mid-May, to his compatriot immigrants in Melbourne at the Dante Alighieri Society a warmly received talk 'Aspects of Modern Art' on the origins of Cubism and the simultaneous rise of Futurism in Italy, alerting the audience to their influences in contemporary life, and discussed the contribution of Italy to modern art, offering as the 'most original Italians' in that period, the artists Carrà, Modigliani, Morandi, De Chirico and Severini.

For Max Harris's Angry Penguins 4th 1940 issue Nibbi's poetic essay on 'Rousseau Le Doouanier' was translated from the Italian, and in the following issue he wrote about Arthur Rimbaud, and in 1941 for Cecily Crozier's A Comment he wrote on El Greco, rhapsodising over his:

...harmony of the vertical line in the gothic cut of characters stretched skywards, as ushered by the ether which blurs their features; organization of acute angles allowing more stressed violation of space; prettiness of tapering fingers to the extent of resembling petals of strange lilies; phosphorescences wriggling along edges of contours, as if burning by contagion. A propos, one could safely remark that everything emerging from his vision, seems both glowing under reverberation of blaze, and slightly veiled by diaphragms of emerald motes.

In Ern Malley's Journal, also edited by Max Harris and John Reed, with Barrie Reid, in 1955 he writes in Italian, translating into English himself, about the 'anti-romantic' qualities of Arthur Boyd's then current production of terracotta sculpture.

== Return to Italy ==
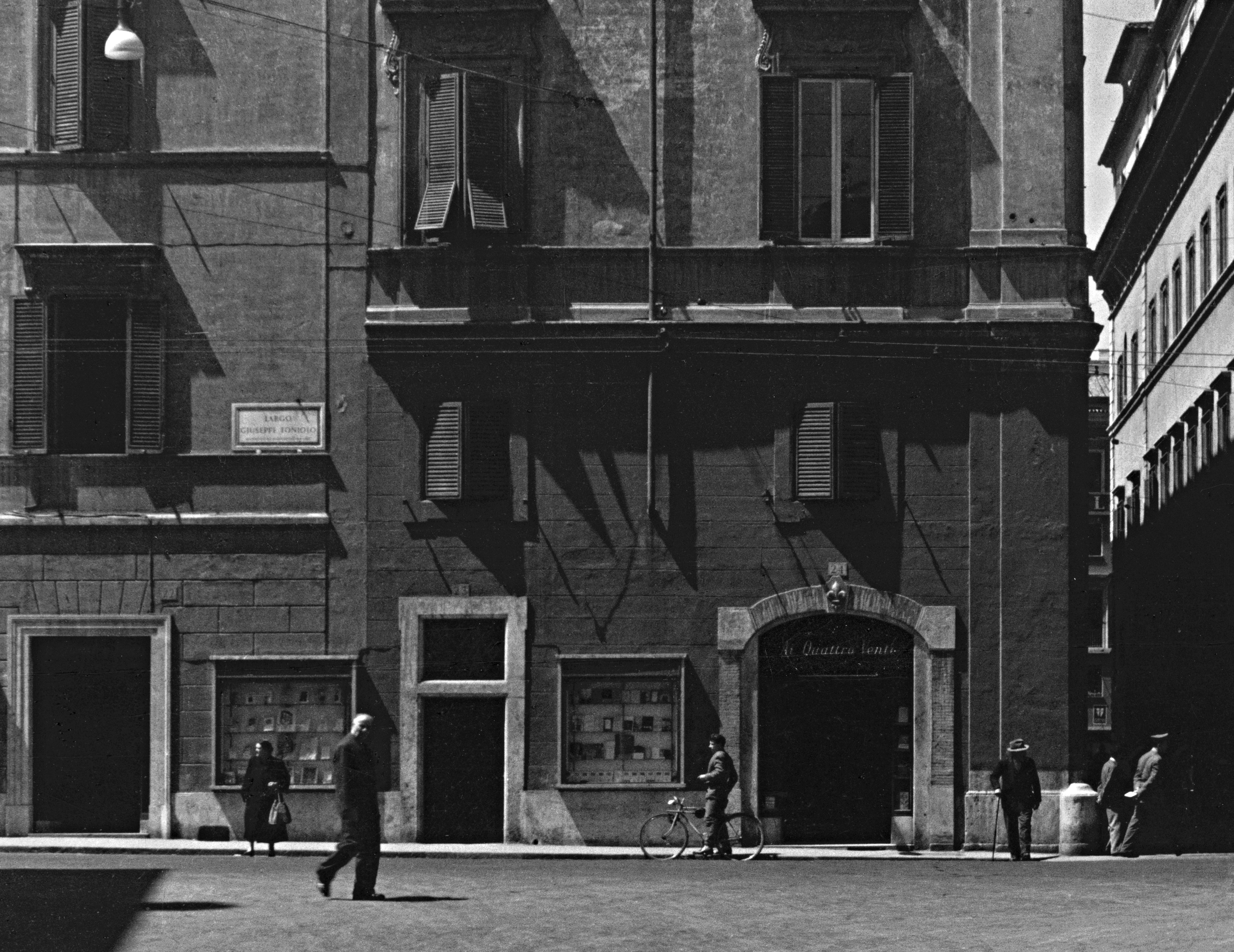
Albert Tucker (c.1953) Gino Nibbi's Galleria ai Quattro Venti in the Piazza di S. Luigi de' Francesi, Rome (detail) State Library of Victoria. Gift of Barbara Tucker, 2010

Nibbi's lease on his shop ended, and unable to find another such accommodation for his business, he returned with his family to Italy in 1947 and opened the bookshop 'Ai Quattro Venti' previously occupied by a supplier of clerical texts, at the southern end of the via della Scrofa in the Piazza di S. Luigi de' Francesi, and on the corner of the Via di S. Giovanna d'Arco in the building (since 2000s) occupied by Institut Français Centre Saint Louis.

Operating that outlet for ten years Nibbi maintained his Australian connection, writing for example on an instigator of the Eureka Stockade, Raffaello Carboni, and mounting an exhibition there of Sidney Nolan's and Albert Tucker's work, before commuting restlessly between his native and adopted countries over 1954-1963, finding himself, as Luzi notes, 'intolerant of Europe, but equally dissatisfied with Australia.'

In the Giornale di Trieste he is provocative about Australian urbanisation; his article 'Skyscrapers in the desert' offers as a paradox Australia's urban-rural divide at odds with the contemporaneous perception of Australia as a primarily rural country: despite vast rural landscapes, Australia is "eminently urban." Populations cramped up in coastal cities, he argues, hinder exploiting Australia's abundant agricultural and mineral resources. Meanwhile Australia is struggling to develop original cultural production. He advocates for a massive influx of international populations to stimulate "biological renewal" and cultural development, diversity being the key to the nation's maturation, a panacea to the psychological effects of geographical isolation and detachment from global intellectual movements. However, he is skeptical of any of the Australian government's efforts on population issues, amused at Prime Minister Chifley's insubordinate, 'paternalistic' immigration proposals to Britain. More positive in a 1949 issue of the Giornale he proposes Sydney is the Sibari of the other hemisphere; an optimistic, welcoming and festive city with a superb ocean outlook. also writing in the same year on New Zealand and the Maori.

During this period Nibbi, then in his fifties, developed diabetes and a gastric ulcer that resulted in part of his digestive tract having to be removed.

== Writer ==
While writing reviews, on Jacques Chardonne and Barbara Hepworth among others, for the weekly cultural supplement of the Italian Idea in 1953, Nibbi published in Florence his philosophical Oracoli sommessi: pagine di breviario ('Whispered Oracles: Breviary pages') a series of short meditations, in the form of breviaries, on diverse subjects; concepts, things, morals, sentiments, like glory, or treachery, places, artists and writers, food, animals and plants.

He revisited Italy in 1957 on the Castel Felice via the Panama Canal and Spain to see his 32-year-old son, and for the 52nd Dante Alighieri congress, returning to Melbourne in April 1958 on the liner Riouw. He was a contributor to La Fiera letteraria, L'Osservatore Politico Letterario and the Australian magazines Art in Australia, Broadsheet, and Modern Art News in which in 1959 he supported the notion that 'the avant-garde art of Australia keeps its own with similar developments of Europe and America, being well in line with the latest trends of style abroad.' In Japan in 1961, he was art critic temporarily replacing its Elise Grilli for the English language Japan Times and produced the unpublished Variazioni Nipponiche, on Japan and its artists. Prior to his permanent return to Italy in 1963 Nibbi went to the inaugural meeting in Melbourne of the Australian members of the International Association of Art Critics.

From 1963, when he and his wife were living in the hills near Rome, he was an art correspondent, and included writing on Australia and Australian artists, in his submissions to Italian journals and the Italian newspapers; Il Tempo, Il Resto del Carlino, and Il Giornale d'Italia; to Goya in Madrid; and to the Melbourne Herald and the Italian language Il Giornale Italiano published in Sydney. These activities had the evident effect of improving cultural relations between the nations of Italy and Australia.

In 1965 in Milan he published another set of short stories set in Australia, Cocktails d'Australia, most of them about the Italian migrant community there, and finally released his promised biography of Amedeo Modigliani as part of the unpublished Galleria, a discussion of one hundred classical and modern artists, both Italian and foreign.

== Later life ==
Enjoying the last six years of his life back in his native country, and visits to the Marche provinces, Nibbi's love of language that he shared with his wife inspired his compiling a dictionary of endangered Italian dialects spoken in Macerata and Ascoli Piceno.

Nibbi died on 17 December 1969 in his home near the supposed site of Cicero's villa at Grottaferrata. He was survived by his partner Elvira, daughter Sandra (b.1923), and son Tristano (b.1925). Buried in the cemetery at Porto San Giorgio, he is commemorated in the name of a road in Porto San Giorgio.

== Published books ==
- Nibbi, Gino (1934). Nelle Isole della Felicita : Tahiti e Isole Sottovento [In the Islands of Happiness: Tahiti and Leeward Islands] (in Italian). Milan: Carabba.
- Nibbi, Gino (1936). Newest Italian-English reader : bilingual : text with translation on the opposite page. Melbourne: Leonardo Art Shop.
- Nibbi, Gino (1937). Il volto degli emigranti : scene di vita in Australia [The Face of Emigrants: Scenes of Life in Australia]. Collezione di letteratura, v. 7 (in Italian). Firenze: Parenti.
- Nibbi, Gino (1953). Oracoli sommessi : pagine di breviario [Whispered Oracles: Breviary pages] (in Italian). Florence: Giacomo Agnell.
- Nibbi, Gino (1965). Cocktails d'Australia [Cocktails of Australia] (in Italian). Milan: Aldo Martello Editore.
