= Il Giornale (disambiguation) =

Il Giornale (English: The Newspaper) may refer to:

- Il Giornale, a newspaper in Milan
- Il Giornale d'Italia, a defunct newspaper in Rome
- Il Giornale Italiano, a defunct Italian-language publication from Australia
- Giornale del Popolo, an Italian-language newspaper in Lugano, Switzerland
- Giornale di Sicilia, a newspaper in Sicily
- Il Giornale, coffee bar chain acquired by Starbucks
