= 9-11 (book) =

2001 book by Noam Chomsky

- Book cover, first edition
- Author: Noam Chomsky
- Language: English
- Publisher: Seven Stories Press
- Publication date: 1 November 2001

9-11 is a collection of interviews with Noam Chomsky first published in November 2001 in the aftermath of the terrorist attacks on the World Trade Center. The revised edition of 2011, 9-11: Was There an Alternative?, includes the entire text of the original book and a new essay by Chomsky, "Was There an Alternative?".

The book was given a 2002 Firecracker Alternative Book Award.

== Content ==
=== 9-11: 2001 first edition ===
In the original edition of 9-11 of November 2001, Chomsky places the September 11 attacks in the context of past American intervention in the Middle East, Latin America, Indonesia, Afghanistan, India, and Pakistan. Chomsky warned against America increasing its reliance on military rhetoric and violence in response to the 9-11 attacks, and that escalation of violence as a response to violence would inevitably lead to more, and more devastating attacks on American civilians at home and around the world.

9-11 is written in a question and answer format. It consists of seven sections, each with one or more interviews of Chomsky. Interviewers include Italian periodical Il Manifesto; Kevin Canfield of the Hartford Courant; David Barsamian; Radio B92 of Belgrade; Elise Fried; Peter Kreysler; Paola Leoni of Giornale del Popolo (Switzerland); Marili Margomenou of Alpha TV (Greece); Miguel Mora of El País (Spain); Natalie Levisalles of Libération (France); and Michael Albert.

The first edition of 9-11 was published in more than two dozen countries and appeared on several bestseller lists, including those of The Washington Post, the Los Angeles Times, The Boston Globe, and The New York Times. An article about it in The New Yorker stated, "9-11 was practically the only counter-narrative out there at a time when questions tended to be drowned out by a chorus, led by the entire United States Congress, of 'God Bless America.' It was one of the few places where the other side of the case could be found."

=== 9-11: Was There an Alternative?: 2011 extended edition ===
The extended edition of the book, published in September 2011, includes a new essay by Chomsky which examines the impact and consequences of US foreign policy up to the killing of Osama bin Laden in Abbottabad, Pakistan, and reflects on what may have resulted if the crimes against humanity committed on 9/11 had been "approached as a crime, with an international operation to apprehend the likely suspects."
