= Victor O'Connor =

Australian artist (1918–2010)

Victor George O'Connor (21 December 1918 – 8 September 2010) was an Australian artist and an exponent of the principles of social realist art. From the time of the Great Depression in the 1930s his work embodied social and political comment on the conditions of working-class people and the structures of society that caused their suffering.

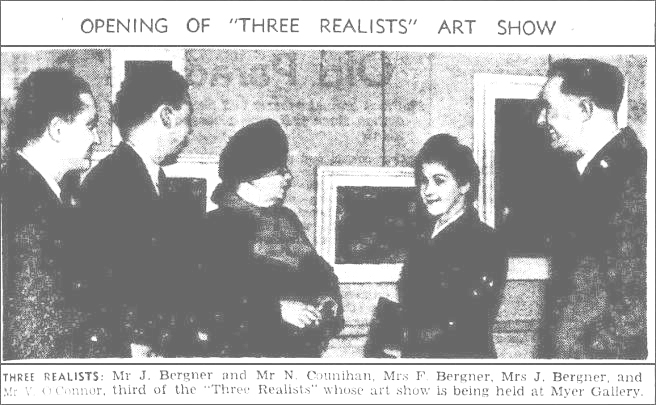
Vic O'Connor at the 'Three Realists' art exhibition in 1946, courtesy The Argus newspaper, 17 July 1946, p. 13

== Ancestry and family ==
Victor George O'Connor was born in Melbourne, on 21 December 1918, to Bertie Edward O'Connor (1882–1951) and Ada Alice (née Clear) (1879–1953).

He and his siblings represented the third generation of his family to have been born in Australia. In the early decades of the 19th century his mother's ancestors had moved to Australia from County Down and neighboring County Armagh in Ireland and from Cornwall in England. During the same period, his father's forebears came from Dublin in Ireland and London in England (as can be seen from the birth, marriage and death records in state and national Public Record Offices and also accessible via commercial genealogy organizations such as Ancestry.com, FindMyPast and FamilySearch).

His parents married on 20 Dec 1905, in Tarraville, Victoria, a once-flourishing country town, approximately 200 kilometres south east of Melbourne, which had been an important hub during the Victorian gold rush. The newly-weds did not remain in Tarraville - by the time of the birth of their first child, in 1906, they had relocated to the city. Vic (as he was usually known) was the fourth of their five children. He was born in 1918 in Preston, a northern suburb of Melbourne.

As in other countries, the Great Depression caused severe, prolonged poverty in Australia in the late 1920s and 1930s. Vic O'Connor's father was already incapacitated by illness, and the general economic failure of the Depression deprived them of the income generated by their stall in the Queen Victoria Market. They moved to the countryside and survived by living the most simple life. As described by McDonnell "This era had a significant and life long effect on O’Connor who observed the hard work, the comradeship and the poverty".

His first wife was Ailsa Margaret O'Connor (née Donaldson) (1921–1980), an Australia painter and sculptor. They were married from 1942 to 1966, and had a son and a daughter.

His second wife was Vera Lilian Brown (née Stanley) (1919–2004), with whom he had a daughter. They were married from c. 1966 to 2004.

== Education and career ==
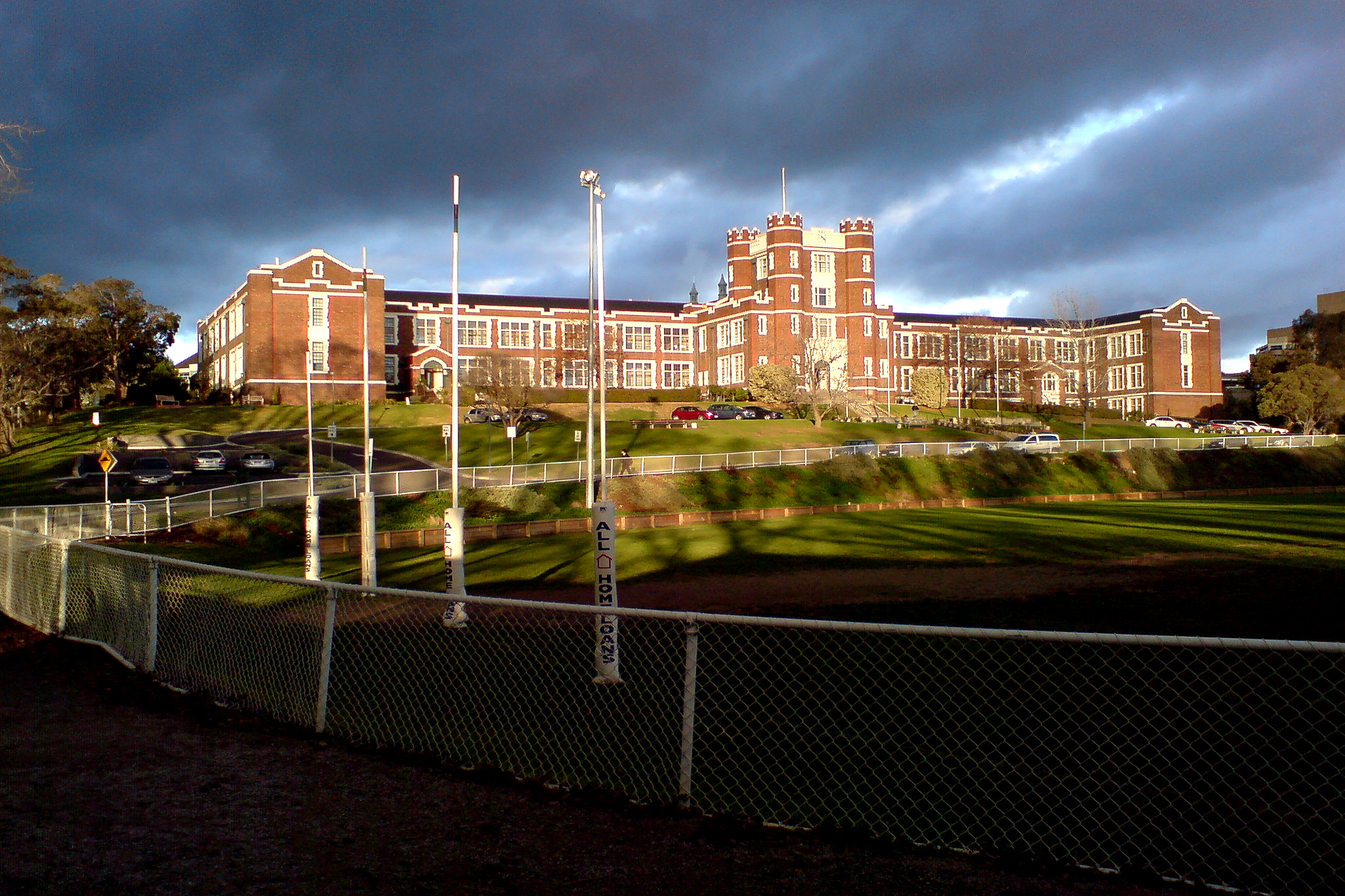
Melbourne High School

O'Connor's schooling took place at Lilydale Primary School and then at Melbourne High School. Interviewed by Barbara Blackman he recalled that from about 1932, aged 14, he’d ‘spend a couple of hours in Gino Nibbi's bookshop, [to] read books [and] look at pictures or talk to Nibbi;’ ‘there was no other bookshop in Melbourne like it,’ and next door was Riddell furniture shop and gallery with exhibitions of Arnold Shore and Danila Vassilieff. Nibbi showed him original works by Giorgio de Chirico, Gino Severini, Carlo Carrà, and Moïse Kisling. O'Connor left Melbourne High School in 1935, then from 1939 to 1945, served with the Australian Army Reserve during the Second World War.

For several terms in 1939 he took Saturday afternoon art classes at the George Bell School, in Melbourne, but was mostly self-taught as an artist. However, the close associations formed there with other artists were enduring. Eagle and Minchin describe the atmosphere and character of Bell's school at the time:

George Bell's contribution to art in Melbourne has been more often recognised than described. He taught more than 1000 students between 1923 and 1966. The first student to emerge as a prominent artist was Eric Thake. With Arnold Shore from 1932–1936, then alone until 1939, he had a school in Bourke Street from which came the important painters of the 1940s, Russell Drysdale, Sali Herman and Peter Purves Smith. The "untrained" moderns Albert Tucker, Vic O'Connor and Adrian Lawlor came to him too. The studio was the focus of conscious modernism. In and out went Sam Atyeo, Ian Fairweather, Jock Frater, Isabel May Tweddle, Mary Cecil Allen, Moya Dyring and Basil Burdett, even John Reed for a while. Over the tea table they prepared strategies against the conservative forces - Menzies, MacDonald, Meldrum. The stylistic enemy was tonal realism. Bell taught 'form', 'distortion', 'expression', and he stressed that art had to arise from imagination. (Eagle and Minchin, 1981)

Following in the footsteps of his eldest brother, Alfred Edward O'Connor, Vic O'Connor was accepted by Melbourne University to study law. He was successful and was awarded a Bachelor of Laws degree (LLB 1940 Law) as confirmed by the university (Alumni Administration Officer, Advancement Office, The University of Melbourne, 2018, personal communication, 12 July). After graduating, he practiced as a solicitor until the late 1950s.

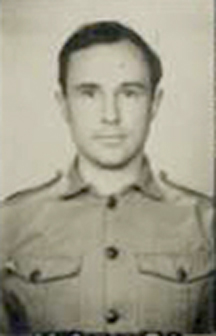
VG O'Connor 1939, military dossier page 2, in National Australian Archives, World War 2 collection.

During World War 2 (1939-1945) O'Connor enlisted in the Army Citizen Military Forces, rising to the rank of Sergeant; his younger brother, Norman Andrew, and his sister's husband, Sidney Henry William Mounsey, fought overseas. O'Connor's photograph appears in his military dossier on page 2, in National Australian Archives, World War 2 collection.

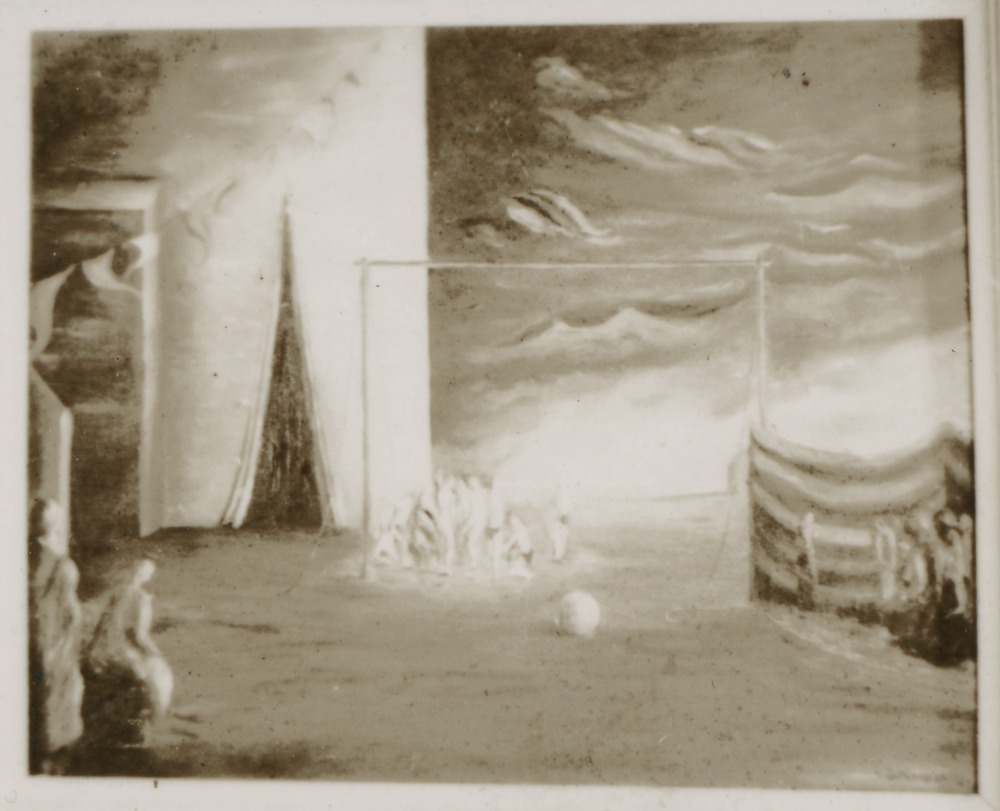
Albert Tucker's 1940 photo of the prize-winning painting by Vic O'Connor is part of a collection of Tucker's contact prints, 1930–1945, courtesy State Library Victoria

He was, at the same time, drawing, painting and exhibiting his work. In 1941, his talent was officially recognized by his peers - he was awarded first prize by the Contemporary Art Society, sharing the prize with Donald Friend. As Bernard Smith stated: "Tucker ... Counihan and O'Connor [were] the three major contributors of the exhibition".

In 1946, O'Connor, Bergner and Counihan held their first major exhibition, Three Realist Artists, 16–25 July 1946, at the Myer Art Gallery in Melbourne which attracted considerable notice and approval. During an interview with John Elder in 1998 O'Connor summed up their direction at the time: "The mainstream were painting yellow circles and black squares and we were painting the passing parade."

By the mid-1950s O'Connor was also gaining recognition as a landscape painter. The Age art critic, Arthur V. Cook praised his scenes for their "poetic warmth and feeling", and noted that they were "richly coloured ... and glow with an inner light".

In 1960 O'Connor was one of several Australian realist artists who, led by Noel Counihan, exhibited in Russia.

At that time, he decided to cease law practice and devote himself entirely to art; moving from Melbourne to Sydney. From 1973 to 1974 he and his family travelled extensively in England, Scotland and Europe, where he painted and exhibited.

It was in 1983 that he finally returned permanently to Victoria, settling in the seaside suburb of Dromana.

He continued to paint well into old age, until prevented by arthritis and failing eyesight. In September 2010 he was buried beside his wife Vera, in Dromana Cemetery, Arthur's Seat, Victoria.

== Awards ==
- CAS (Melbourne) Prize shared with Donald Friend 1941

== Represented ==
As at July 2018, the Australian Art Sales Directory lists the Australian museums holding works by Vic O'Connor as follows:

- Art Gallery of New South Wales (5 works)
- Ian Potter Museum of Art, Melbourne University (3 works)
- Geelong Gallery, Victoria (6 works)
- National Gallery of Australia, Canberra, ACT (80 works)
- National Gallery of Victoria, Melbourne (7 works)

In addition the biography of Vic O'Connor on the web site of the Bridget O'Donnell Gallery records other holdings in:

- State galleries in Brisbane, Hobart and Perth;
- Victorian regional galleries at Benalla, Bendigo, Mornington and Warrnambool;
- South Australian regional gallery at Mt Gambier;
- Queensland University collection.

== Bibliography ==
Further reading:

- Bernard Smith, Australian Painting 1788 - 1970, Oxford University Press 1974
- Allan McCulloch, Encyclopedia of Australian Art, Hutchinson 1977
- Jean Campbell, Australian Watercolour Painters 1780 - 1980, Rigby 1982
- Max Germaine, Artists and Galleries of Australia, Boolarong 1984
