= The Sunday Telegraph (Sydney) =

Australian newspaper

- Type: Weekly newspaper
- Format: Tabloid
- Owner: News Corp Australia
- Editor: Mick Carroll
- Political alignment: Conservative, popular
- Headquarters: 2 Holt Street, Surry Hills, New South Wales, Australia
- Website: www.dailytelegraph.com.au

The Sunday Telegraph is an Australian tabloid newspaper, the separately published Sunday edition of The Daily Telegraph. It is available throughout Sydney, across most of regional and remote New South Wales, the Australian Capital Territory and South East Queensland. As of December 2018, The Sunday Telegraph was Australia's biggest selling weekend tabloid newspaper.

== History ==
The Sunday Telegraph was founded in 1939 by Frank Packer, as the weekend version of the Daily Telegraph, which he had acquired in 1936. On its first front page on 19 November 1939, it reported on Nazi Germany's oppression of the Czechs, after the Nazi invasion of Czechoslovakia in 1938. The first editor was Cyril Pearl who worked with the editor of the Daily Telegraph Brian Penton to fight against government censorship during the war. Packer sold the Sunday Telegraph along with the Daily Telegraph to News Limited on 5 June 1972.

== Publication ==
The Sunday Telegraph is produced in the Holt Street, Surry Hills offices of News Corp Australia It is printed at the Chullora and Gold Coast printing presses and distributed across New South Wales, Canberra and South East Queensland.

== Structure ==
The Sunday Telegraph is a tabloid style newspaper, with a strong emphasis on family and giveaways. The newspaper contains five distinct sections as well as five liftouts.

=== Sections ===
- News – breaking news and investigative journalism from around Australia.
- World – news from around the globe.
- Sport – features sport news from around Australia and the world (also includes The Punter, a racing liftout.)
- Insider – the back pages of the newspaper, featuring gossip and celebrity news.

=== Liftouts ===
- Body+Soul – a health and lifestyle magazine with an emphasis on women.
- Stellar – a glossy liftout featuring interviews, fashion and delicious on Sunday food section.
- Escape – a large travel magazine featuring stories and travel deals.
- TV Guide – features television guide and entertainment news and reviews.

== Editor ==
The current editor is Mick Carroll (former deputy editor of The Daily Telegraph and editor of the Townsville Bulletin) who has edited the paper since 2012. Carroll also became editor of The Saturday Telegraph in 2019.

== Accolades ==
In addition to being Australia's most widely read weekend tabloid newspaper, The Sunday Telegraph won News Limited's Newspaper of the Year Award at the 2011 News Awards.

== Controversies ==
=== 'Black Lives Matter' coverage ===
On 14 June 2020 the Sunday Telegraph published an opinion column headlined "Where's the Real Justice?" dismissing the Black Lives Matter protests concerning police behaviour and Black deaths in custody. The article said that "The reality in this country - and the US - is that the greatest danger to aboriginals and negroes - is themselves." The article referred to the shooting of a white Australian woman by US police and asked "where were the marches through the streets of Australia after Ms Damond died?". In response to a complaint submitted to the press regulator, the publication claimed that 'the columnist is entitled to express his personal views on issues which are clearly in the public interest.' Concerns were raised that the article was based on unfounded racist generalisations, employed pejorative slurs, and characterised Black people as the key perpetrators of racial violence. After an investigation spanning 15 months, the Australian Press Council concluded that the article breached its media ethics General Principles because it was (a) based on significantly inaccurate material or omitted key facts, and (b) materially contributed to distress, offence, or prejudice without any public interest justification.

=== Press Council complaint regarding Mark Latham article ===
In December 2011, The Sunday Telegraph published two articles about former Labor leader Mark Latham and an alleged argument he had with his child's swimming teacher. Mr Latham complained to the Australian Press Council that there was a conflict of interest which should have been disclosed as the reporter was the daughter of one of the swim teachers at the school. Mr Latham also complained that the articles breached the privacy of his family, especially his young children, and were not in the public interest. The Press Council upheld the complaint and published the following statement (extract only):

The Council emphasises that in accordance with generally-recognised principles a conflict of interest exists where there is a reasonable possibility that the conflict will affect a reporter's impartiality, irrespective of whether it actually does so. Accordingly, this aspect of the complaint is upheld.

The Council also found that there had been an "unreasonable intrusion on the children's privacy" and upheld that aspect of the complaint.
