= Cyril Pearl =

Australian journalist, author and television personality

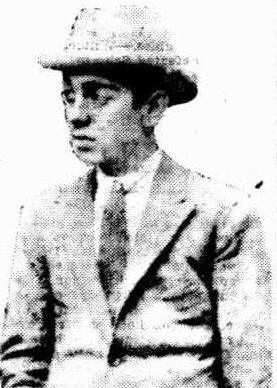
- Pearl aged 20
- Born: 11 April 1904; Melbourne, Australia
- Died: 3 March 1987 (aged 82); Sydney, Australia
- Education: University of Melbourne
- Occupations: Journalist, author and television personality
- Spouse(s): Irma Janetzki, Patricia Donohoe
- Children: 2
- Writing career
- Language: English
- Years active: 1933–1987
- Notable works: Wild Men of Sydney (1958), Morrison of Peking (1967)

Cyril Alston Pearl (11 April 1904 – 3 March 1987) was an Australian journalist, author, and television personality.

== Life and career ==
Pearl was born in the Melbourne suburb of Fitzroy, Victoria, on 11 April 1904 to Jewish gem-dealer Joseph Pearl and his wife Goldy, both immigrants from Britain. He was educated at Scotch College, Melbourne, and Hale College, Perth, after the family moved to Western Australia. Cyril returned to Victoria to attended the University of Melbourne, where he studied philosophy and Russian, leaving without a degree.

During his first year at university he became co-editor of the student newspaper Farrago. With Gino Nibbi he established the literary monthly Stream in 1931, which lasted only three issues. He also founded Transition Press, with artist Irma Janetzki, whom he married in 1934.

Pearl's career in journalism began in 1933 when he joined the staff of the Star newspaper in Melbourne. He had become an accomplished reporter, writer and sub-editor by the time it closed three years later. Together with other former Star journalists, he travelled north to Sydney where he joined Sir Frank Packer's Daily Telegraph, and was soon made features editor. Packer made him editor of The Sunday Telegraph, and, by 1948, his duties included editorship of a new monthly magazine, A.M..

He left The Daily Telegraph in 1950 then resigned from Consolidated Press entirely in 1953 and moved back to Melbourne. There he became a freelance writer, producing hundreds of articles, columns and reviews for magazines and newspapers, including The Sydney Morning Herald, Nation, Nation Review and the Weekend Australian.

Pearl scripted the film Anzac (1959) by Adrian and Jennie Boddington, which pioneered the use of historical stills with rostrum camera effects and was amongst early Australian Film Institute Award winners.

Pearl also wrote more than 20 books in the last three decades of his life. He had a special interest in social history, biography and politics, and research for these works sometimes took him overseas. His book Wild Men of Sydney, exposing corruption in colonial Sydney, was published in 1958. As an editor he published many great Australian writers, including Lennie Lower. He made a brief return to journalism after Rupert Murdoch persuaded him to become editor of The Sunday Mirror in Sydney in 1960.

His literary friends included Clive Turnbull, Richard Hughes, Clem Christesen, Peter Ryan, Alan Moorehead and Chester Wilmot.

His wife, Irma, died in 1962. In 1965, he married Patricia Donohoe in Sydney. Pearl died in 1987, survived by his second wife, and the younger of his two sons.

== Bibliography ==
- Our Yesterdays (1954)
- The Girl with the Swansdown Seat (1955)
- Wild Men of Sydney (1958)
- Bawdy Burns: The Christian Rebel (1958)
- So, You Want to be an Australian (1959)
- Always Morning: The Life of Richard Henry "Orion" Horne (1960)
- So, You Want to Buy a House ... and Live in It (1961)
- ANZAC Newsreel: A Picture History of Gallipoli (1963)
- The Best of Lennie Lower (1963) (editor)
- Pantaloons and Antics; or, Doodling with a Hermes (1964)
- Morrison of Peking (1967)
- Beer, Glorious Beer: With Incidental Observations ... (1969)
- Dublin in Bloomtime: The City James Joyce Knew (1969)
- Rebel Down Under: When the "Shenandoah" Shook Melbourne, 1865 (1970)
- Hardy Wilson and His Old Colonial Architecture (1970)
- Sydney Revels (1970)
- The Victorian Era, 1850–1900 (1971)
- Brilliant Dan Deniehy: A Forgotten Genius (1972)
- Victorian Patchwork (1972)
- Five Men Vanished: The Bermagui Mystery (1978)
- The Three Lives of Gavan Duffy (1979)
- The Dunera Scandal: Deported by Mistake (1983)
- Limericks Down Under (1985) (co-editor with Alan Benjamin)

== Sources ==
- Day, Mark (31 October 2008). "Cyril Pearl: a fortunate life". The Australian.
- William H. Wilde, Joy Hooton & Barry Andrews, (1986) The Oxford Companion to Australian Literature, Oxford University Press, Melbourne, p. 551.
