= Ailsa O'Connor =

Australian Sculptor (1921–1980)

Ailsa Margaret O'Connor (née Donaldson) (26 January 1921 – 3 February 1980) was an Australian artist specialising in sculpture and painting in the style of realism. Following her belief that art and artists cannot be separated from questions of society and politics, she was an activist against social injustice in Australia and abroad, and particularly against suppression of the rights of women.

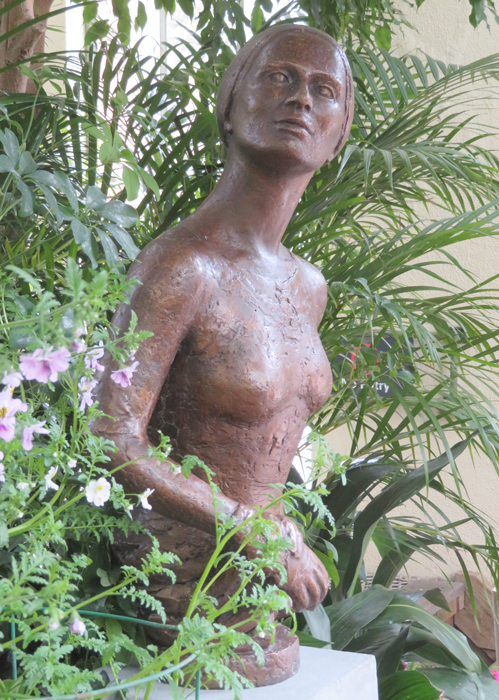
Mary Gilbert, ciment fondu, by Ailsa O'Connor 1974, Fitzroy Gardens, Melbourne, Australia

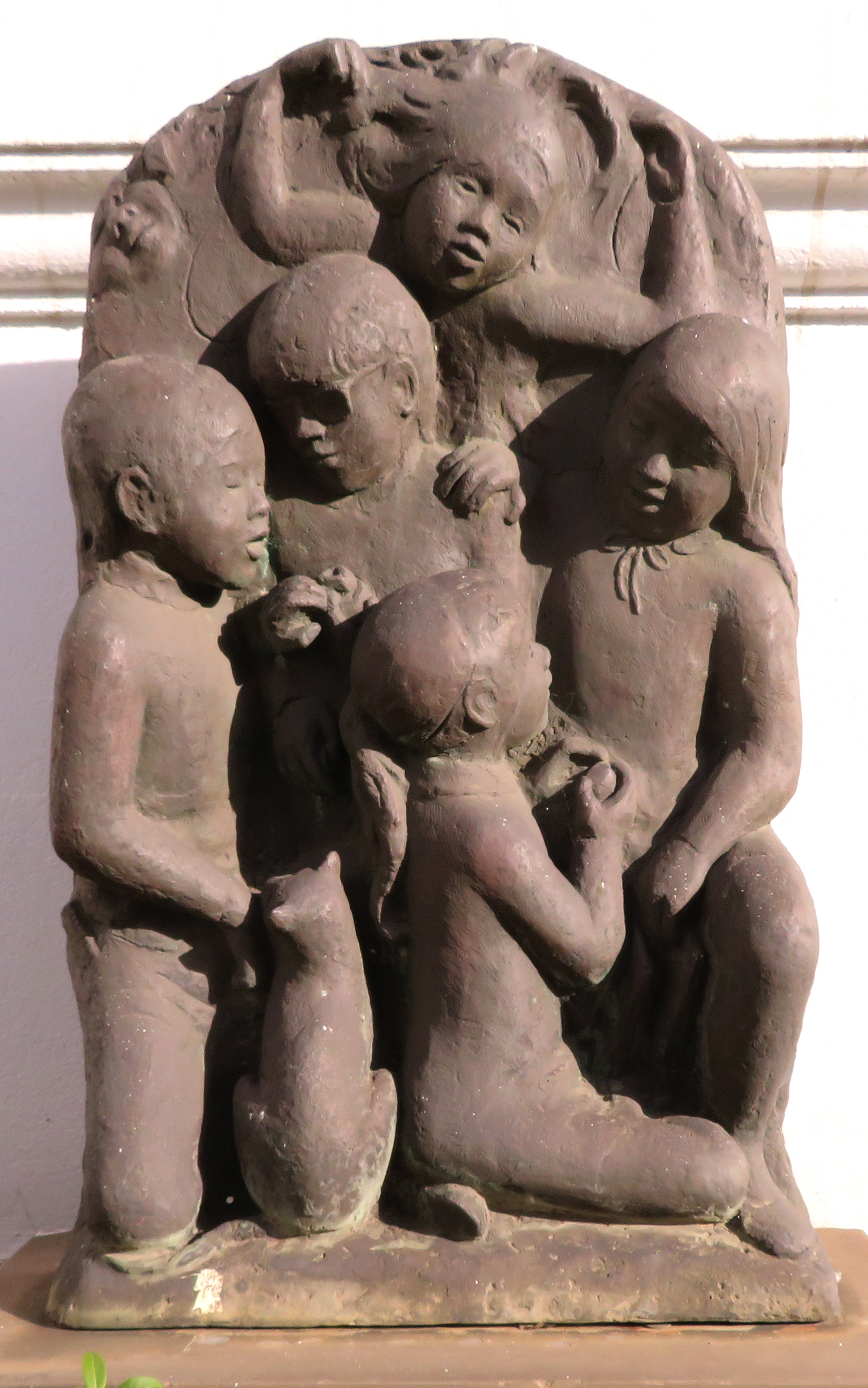
Ourselves When Young, bronze, by Ailsa O'Connor 1979, Glen Eira Town Hall. The title is a tribute to the Australian writer Ethel Florence Lindesay Richardson, pen name Henry Handel Richardson, who lived in Maldon as a child (1880–1886), and named her autobiographical book Myself When Young, 1948.

== Background ==
The discovery of gold in Australia was first made public overseas in September 1851. As a result, hundreds of thousands of people arrived in Australia over the next 10 years, amongst them Ailsa O’Connor's ancestors – miners from Ireland and Wales and stonemasons from Scotland. Their various destinations were in the future state of Victoria.

=== Maternal family – Maldon ===
Ailsa O'Connor's maternal ancestor who landed in Australia in 1862, was William David (1835–1904), a coal miner from the ancient town of Neath, Glamorgan, Wales.

William David, his Welsh wife Ann Walters (1836–1899) and their two young children settled in Maldon, Victoria where he continued mining – but for gold rather than coal. At the time of his arrival Australian wage-earning gold miners were beginning to form the first mining trade unions, demanding that mining companies reform workers' conditions, including an eight-hour working day (albeit for six days per week) and improved health and safety measures. The Maldon Museum has the banner of the Amalgamated Miners' Association of Australasia – the earliest known surviving trade union banner in Victoria.

William and Ann David, with many of their children and some of their grandchildren led their lives in Maldon, and were buried in the Maldon Cemetery – see the supplementary pictures section, at the end of this article.

William David's son Alfred married Australian-born Amelia Jane Birmingham (1862–1942), whose Irish father, Thomas Birmingham from County Armagh was also a miner in Maldon, and whose mother Emma Caroline Goodhead was English, from the city of Birmingham.

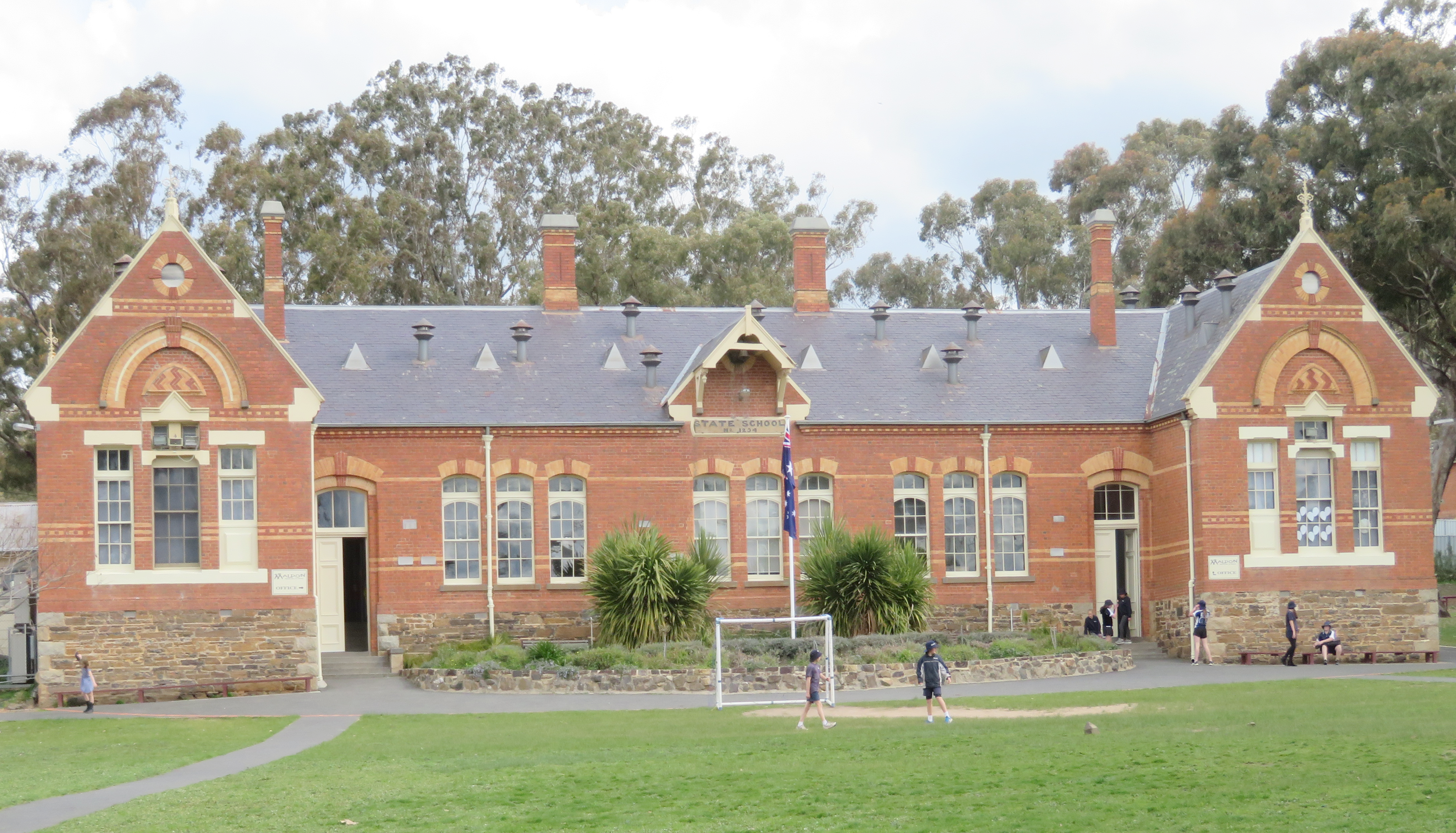
Maldon Primary School, officially opened 1875, still in use in 2018. Victorian Heritage listing no. H1394

The Maldon State School Pupil Register records the admission of Alfred David's future wife when she was 12 years of age, in 1874. It later registers the admission of her second daughter Amelia Jane David (known as Millie) aged 3 years 1 month, in 1888.

Margaret Flora David (1888–1968) was the fourth of their 12 children born in Maldon.

Upon her marriage, in 1915, Margaret Flora David left Maldon and went with her new husband, Ralph Charles Donaldson (1888–1955) to his home town, Heyfield in Gippsland, Victoria.

Her husband worked as a labourer until, at 40 years of age, he had learned the skills of a baker. The family moved to the far south-west of Victoria to Portland and were soon running the bakery there. The bakery building (now a bank) stands on the corner of Henty and Percy Streets. It has been heritage-listed for preservation.

=== Paternal family – Heyfield ===
Her paternal ancestors descended from a line of stonemasons living in the 14th century town of Airdrie, North Lanarkshire in Scotland. David Donaldson (1820–1886), had left Scotland for America, then joined the new gold rush to Melbourne, Victoria in about 1852. There he married another Scot, Annie Thomson (1826–1906), and set up his own stonemason's company.

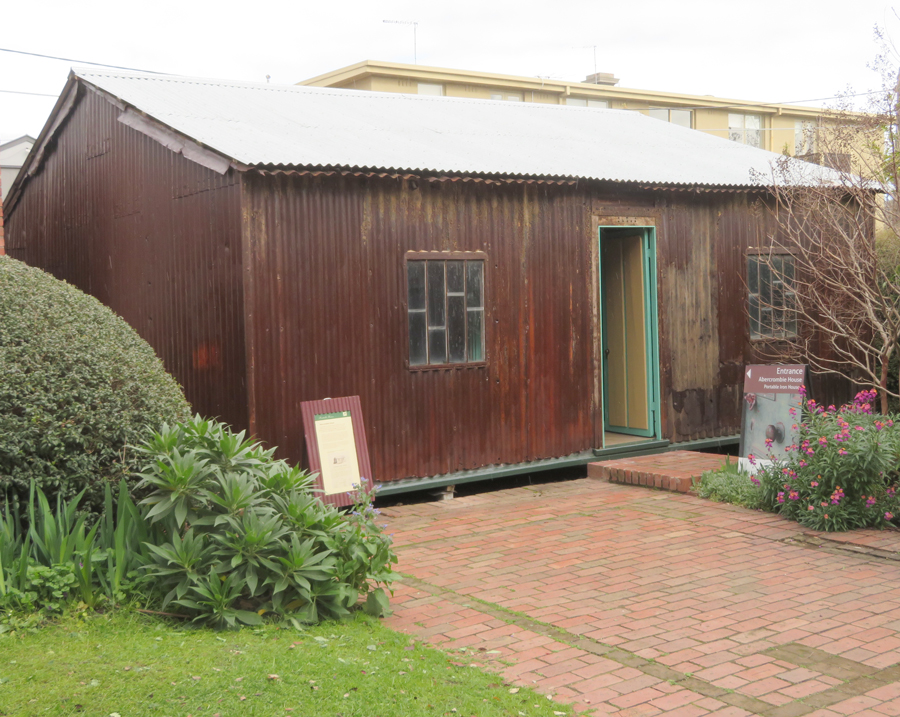
Portable Iron House, erected 1853 – back view with outline of brick foundation of external kitchen; National Trust property B0354

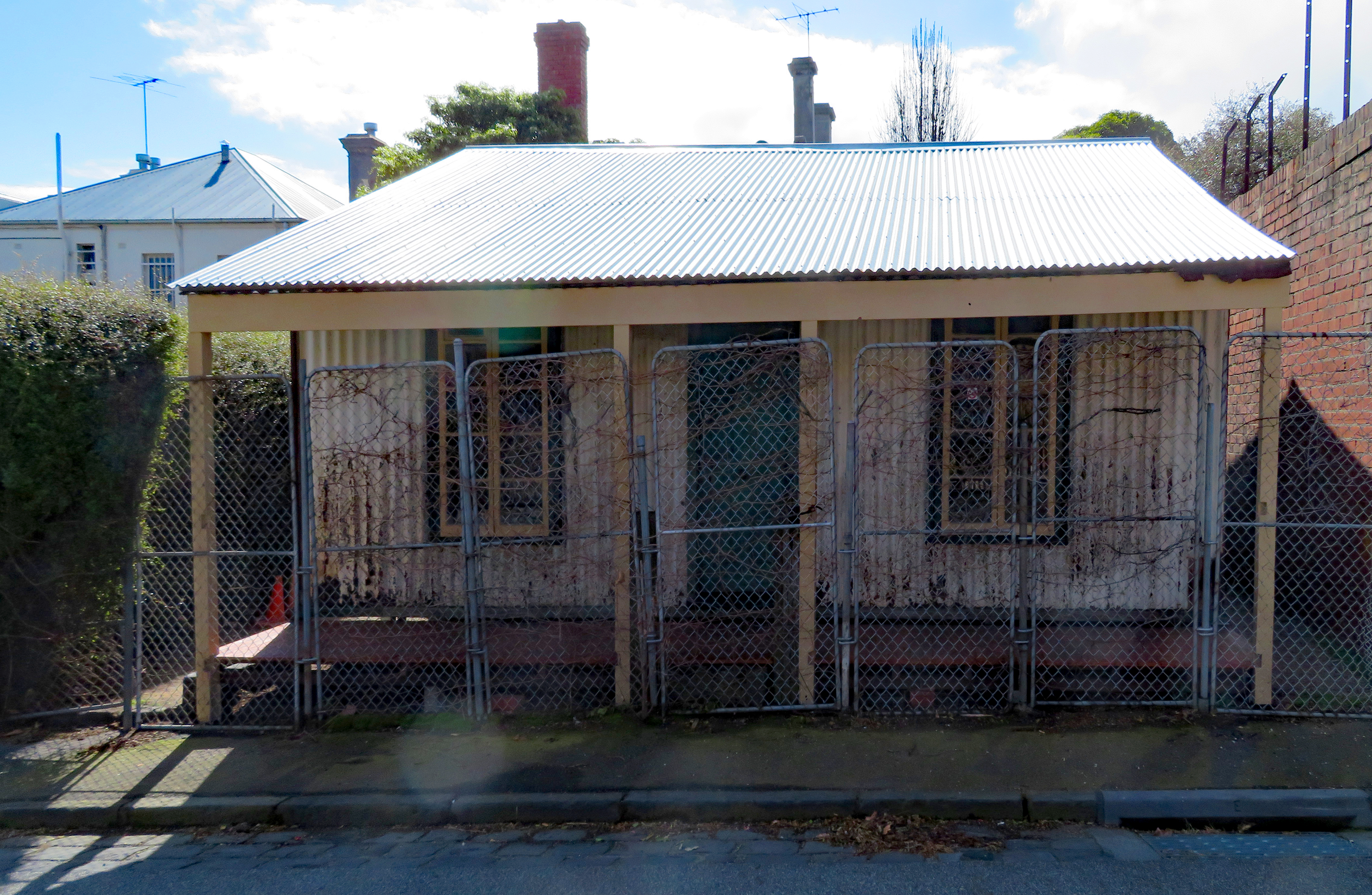
Portable Iron House, erected 1853 – front view; National Trust property B0354

For five years the Donaldsons lived in a pre-fabricated iron house in North Melbourne that is now heritage-listed and conserved by the National Trust.

In the 1860s the high country to the east of Melbourne caused a number of gold rushes, including in Matlock in 1861. The Gippsland area originally attracted not only gold prospectors but also settlers with agriculture in mind, as well as service providers catering to locals and travellers bound further afield.

David Donaldson and his family moved east, setting up a general store first in Matlock and then in 1878 in Morwell where he remained until his death in 1886.

His widow Annie and the two youngest sons, John Goulburn Donaldson and David Donaldson (Jnr) continued to run the general store for more than a decade, until Annie moved back to Melbourne for health reasons and the sons traversed the continent to another gold-rich area, Coolgardie, Western Australia. Annie's daughter, Agnes, had settled in Western Australia in 1894 with her husband, Charles Sommers, who became a member of the Western Australian parliament from 1901–1918, after having been the mayor of Coolgardie, 1896–1900.

Meanwhile, two other of David Donaldson's children had left Morwell for nearby Aberfeldy: the oldest daughter Elizabeth married an Aberfeldy butcher, the Irishman Thomas Dwyer from Tipperary, in 1879. Shortly afterwards, her brother Henry became the postmaster in the village, from 1880–1885.

After the death of Elizabeth (September 1884, aged 29) which was followed by that of her husband Thomas Dwyer (December 1885), the three orphaned Dwyer children lived with their grandparents, David and Annie Donaldson, in Morwell. The eldest, John Patrick Dwyer, showed extraordinary academic and sporting abilities, and would later become Chief Justice of Western Australia and be honoured with a knighthood and then a KCMG in 1949.

At the time of Elizabeth's death, her brother Henry Donaldson and his wife and children also moved away from Aberfeldy to Heyfield, where he was postmaster until 1896. His wife, Elsie, née Scott (1862–1948), took over from him for five years, being Heyfield's postmistress from 1886–1900.

Heyfield remained their home, and their third son, Ralph Charles continued to live there for many years with his widowed mother Elsie and his wife and three daughters, until the move to the Portland Bakery in 1928.

=== War heroes, 1914–1918 ===
Two of Annie Donaldson's sons were involved in World War I, as was her grandson, the elder son of her late daughter Elizabeth, John Patrick Dwyer.

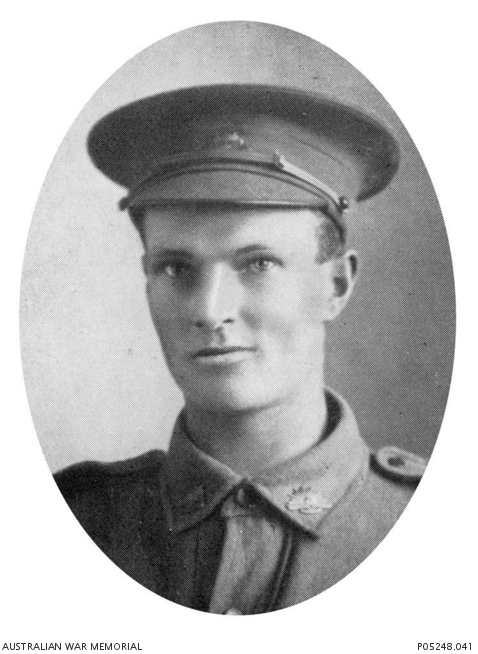
Henry Archibald Donaldson 1916, Australian War Memorial World War 1 Collection

Ralph Charles Donaldson DCM was the first to enlist, aged 27. He became a driver in the 2nd Australian Division Signals Company from 12 Feb 1915 to 28 March 1919, fighting in 18 different locations. He was awarded the Distinguished Conduct Medal, on 14 Dec 1916, for conspicuous gallantry on two occasions, working under heavy fire to maintain vital communication lines between base camp and the battle front. His service number was 1186.

Henry Archibald ("Archie") Donaldson enlisted in January 1916, at the age of 29. He was a school teacher living in Portland, Victoria. As a private in the 58th Australian Infantry Battalion he fought in 15 different locations, before falling in battle at the Somme on 13 March 1917. He is buried in Bull's Road Military Cemetery, Flanders, Picardy in France. His service number was 5089.

Their cousin, John Patrick Dwyer also enlisted, aged 35. In Freemantle he joined the 44th Australian Infantry Battalion in March 1916, returning to Australia after the end of the war. He reached the rank of lieutenant within 12 months. He had no service number, since he was an officer.

== Childhood ==
Ralph Charles Donaldson's second daughter, Ailsa, was educated in the towns where her parents lived: Heyfield and then Portland, until her final year at school which she spent apart from her family, at Mac.Robertson Girls High School in Melbourne. There she matriculated with five subjects – gaining honours in two : Art and English.

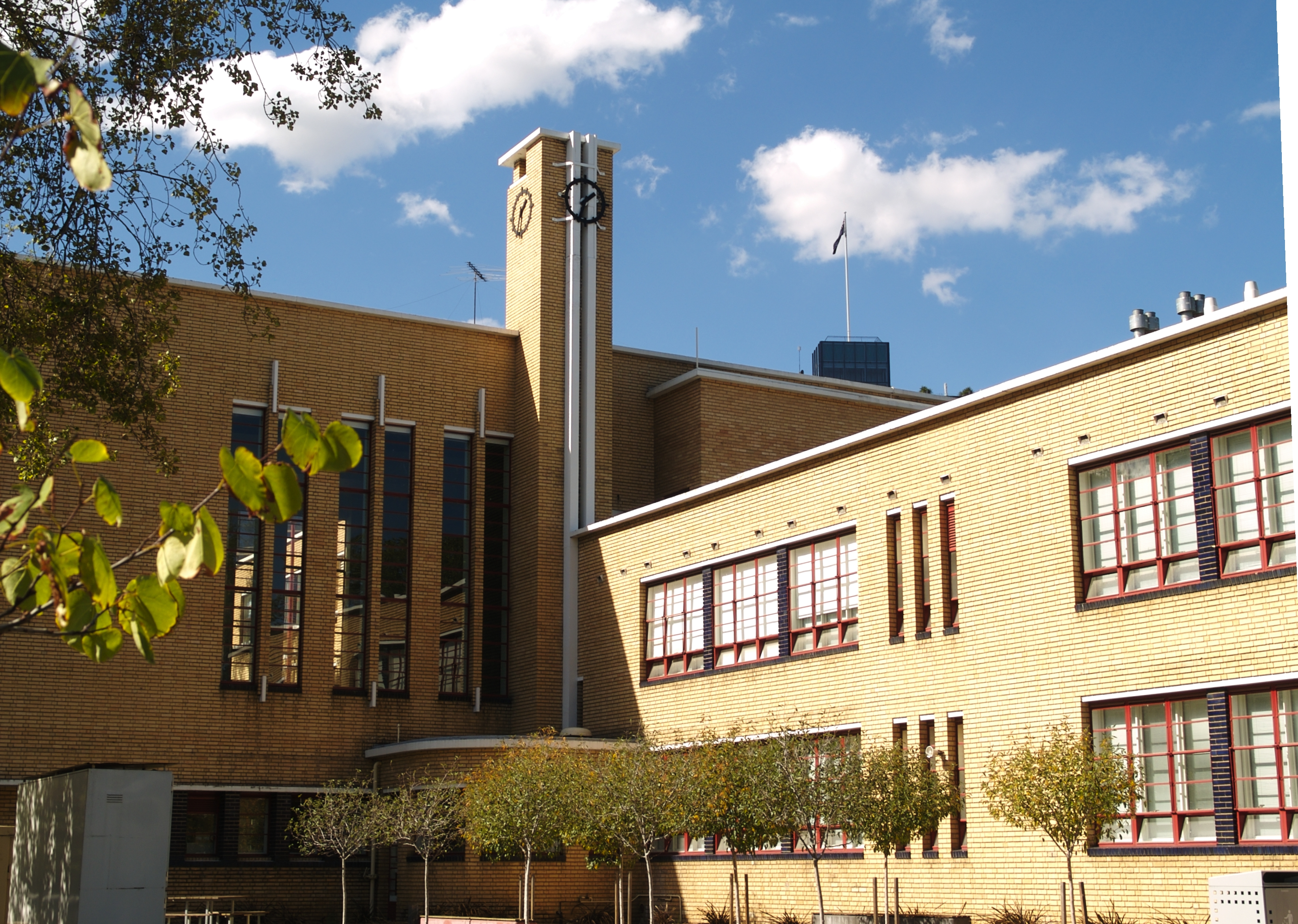
Mac.Robertson Girls High School, Melbourne

Ailsa Donaldson is reported by Sandy Kirby as recalling that after school her tertiary education began in 1937:

I left home at fifteen, was at school in Melbourne, and at sixteen commenced an art course at Royal Melbourne Institute of Technology on a technical scholarship which paid an allowance of £7 a term plus fees. I used up two years of the four-year scholarship, managed to cram in a teaching course as well as a fine art course by going to classes every night, then a further year of teacher training, and at nineteen I was on the payroll in front of those large wartime classes of Brunswick boys, ousted from their classrooms by the needs of airforce trainees. (Kirby, 1995)

Not only disruptions to school life resulted from World War II – most other aspects of Australian life were impacted by the severity of the austerity and dangers at home, added to anxiety for the troops sent overseas. The Australian National Archives' World War II Collection contains the military dossiers of six male relatives of Ailsa's extended David and Donaldson families who fought overseas, whilst at home, her widowed aunt, Annie Ethel Warren, née Donaldson, enlisted in the Army Citizen Military Forces in Melbourne, at the age of 50.

Ailsa Donaldson married during the war, to another artist Victor George O'Connor, who enlisted in the Army Citizen Military Forces, rising to the rank of Sergeant, whilst his younger brother, Norman Andrew, and his sister's husband, Sidney Henry William Mounsey, fought overseas. Ailsa took her husband's surname thereafter, becoming Ailsa O'Connor.

== Artistic maturity ==
The year before the outbreak of World War II, in 1938, the avant-garde Contemporary Arts Society of Victoria (CAS) held its inaugural meeting in Melbourne. Ailsa Donaldson, aged 16, registered as one of the founding members. Thereafter she regularly exhibited paintings and drawings in CAS exhibitions. Although there were other women painters in the Society, Ailsa Donaldson was alone in aligning herself with the politically-engaged social realist sub-group rather than the sub-group known as the Angry Penguins. As Kirby noted: she "was the only woman to exhibit in the 1942 Melbourne “Anti-Fascist Exhibition" (Kirby, p. 419). Unfortunately "all her paintings from this period [the war years] are lost" (Burke, p. 66).

The Australian radio presenter, producer, editor and researcher, Julie Copeland, contributed the foreword to the book of the posthumous collection of O'Connor's written works entitled Unfinished Work published in 1982. Copeland described O'Connor's enduring concern for the suffering and humiliation of poor and disadvantaged people, and noted that her political activism in seeking change left too little time and energy available for her development as an artist.

Other strong demands upon her included her commitment to her full-time employment as a secondary school teacher and headmistress for fifteen years until 1970, and her role as a mother.

Her resources were stretched even further by her involvement in the rise of Second Wave Feminism in the 1960s and 1970s. Her activities as a feminist had a lasting effect, as Burke recalled:

Many of the networks initiated in those years are still functioning. For example, the Women's Art Register, started in 1975 ... Kiffy Rubbo and Ailsa O'Connor ... helped to shape their time and the memory of them shapes it still. (Burke, 1990, p. 2)

She also made time to write lengthy newspaper articles and papers about art and contemporary issues, and to review the written work of colleagues. For example, in her book review in 1975, of Noel Counihan by Max Dimmack, she touches on a quest that she, herself, was preoccupied with:

Perhaps we women are becoming more aware of the distinction between fantasy, role, and reality, or perhaps it is just that no artist has yet produced a convincing image of contemporary woman. (O'Connor, 1975)

A sense of the breadth and depth of O'Connor's involvement in following her convictions can be gleaned from a summary of the public record of her activities, from her early adulthood until her death in 1980:

Exhibitions

O'Connor contributed paintings, drawings, linocuts and sculpture to exhibitions held in Melbourne, including for instance:

- 1938 – c.1942: with the Contemporary Art Society, Melbourne, established by George Bell in 1938:
- 1950s & 1960s: with the Realist Group, Melbourne (other members included Noel Counihan, Mary Hammond, Ken Scarlett and VG O'Connor)
- 1971: in an exhibition with Mary Hammond
- 1975: at the Russell Davis Gallery – a solo exhibition of sculpture and drawings
- 1978: at the McClelland Regional Gallery – a printmakers’ group exhibition
- 1979: at the Trades Hall Gallery with Mary Hammond
- 1989: [Posthumous] at the Niagara Galleries, 22 November – 9 December

Memberships

O’Connor actively supported the causes that were important to her, including the following:

- 1944–1980: Communist Party of Australia
- 1950–1955: Union of Australian Women, founding member and Secretary
- 1953: World Congress of Women, Copenhagen, she was the Victorian delegate from the Union of Australian Women
- 1953–1956: Asian Australian Child Art Exchange, initiator and organiser

Representation in public galleries

Private collections hold the majority of O’Connor's works of art; she is also represented in several Australian public art galleries

- Tasmania Museum and Art Gallery, Hobart, Tasmania, Australia (2 works)
- National Gallery of Australia, Canberra, ACT (number awaiting confirmation)
- National Gallery of Victoria, Australia (1 linocut: 'Building the Stockade' 1954)
- Art Gallery of New South Wales, Australia (reference to above-mentioned linocut)

Art awards received

- 1945: 'Australia at War' exhibition: first prize, for a painting in the 'Women in Industry’ section
- 1953: May Day Art Competition: first prize
- 1979: Caulfield City Council Invitation Art Award: winner
- 2001: posthumously inducted into the Victorian Honour Roll of Women

== Supplementary pictures ==
Maldon Cemetery – the David family graves

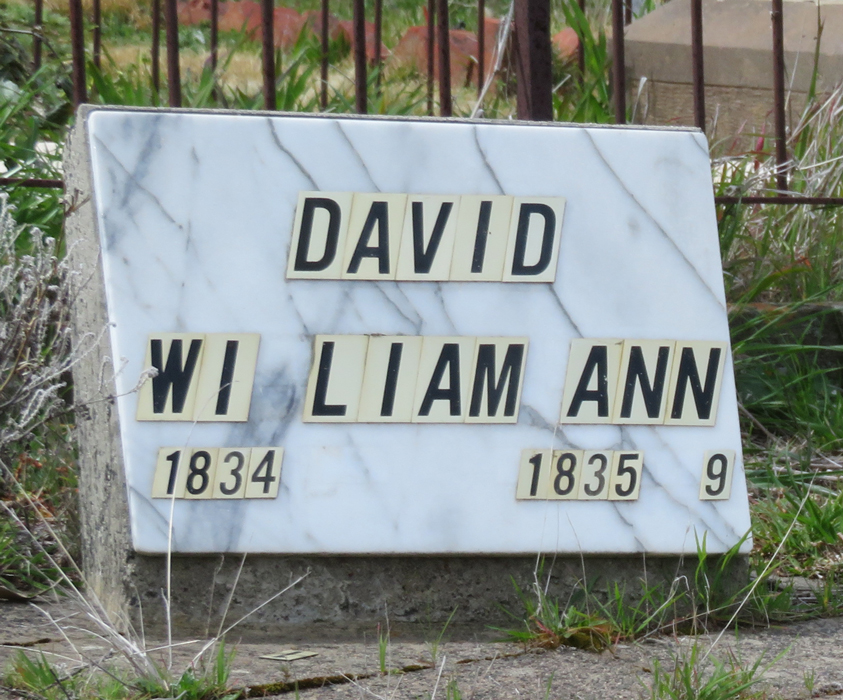
William David (1835–1903) Ann David, née Walters (1836–1899)

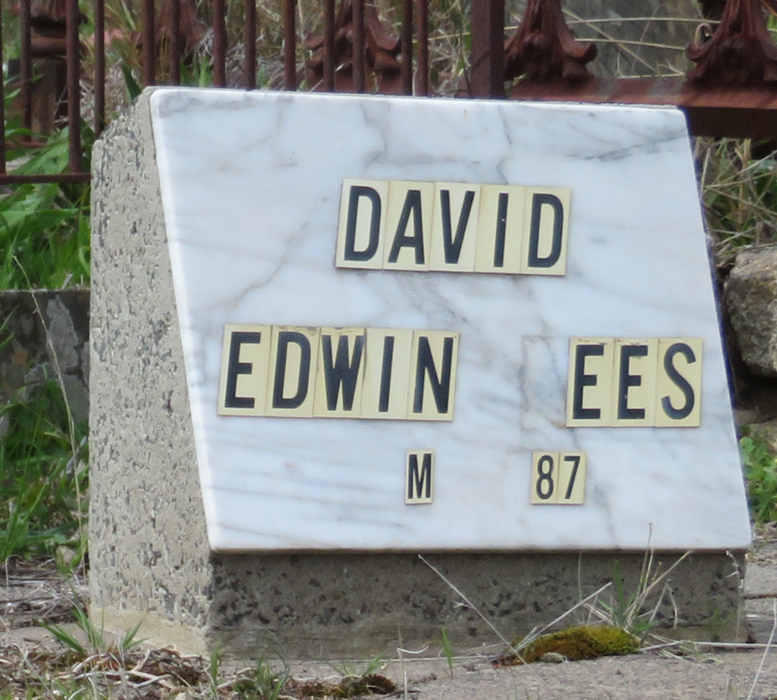
Edwin David (1867–1867) Rees David, (1871–1871)

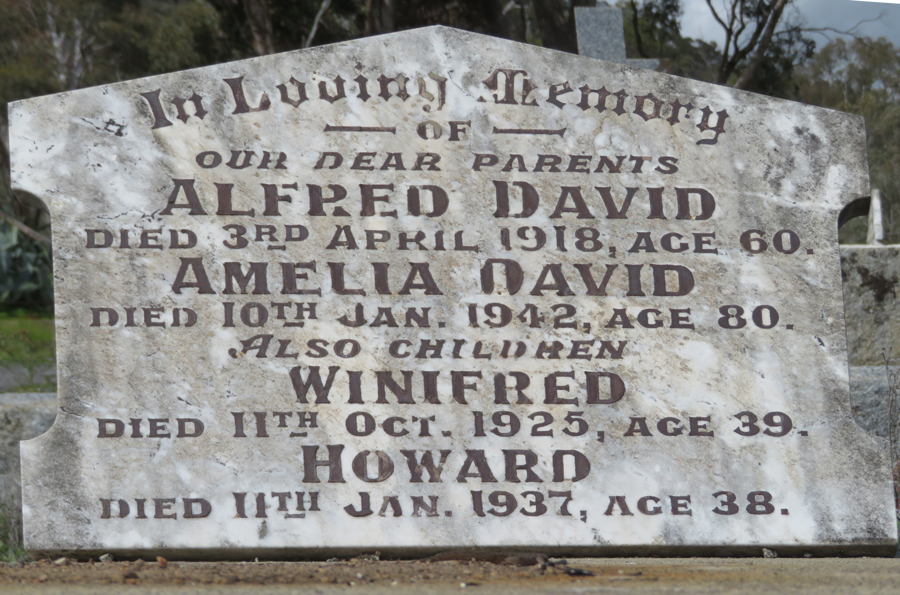
Alfred (1858–1918) Amelia (1862–1942) Winifred (1886–1925) Howard (1898–1937)

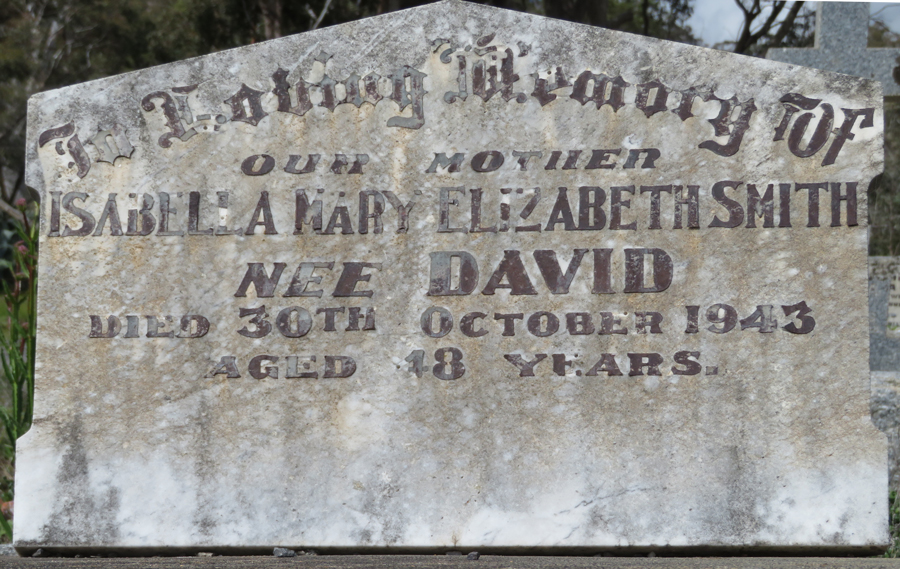
Isabella David (1895–1943)

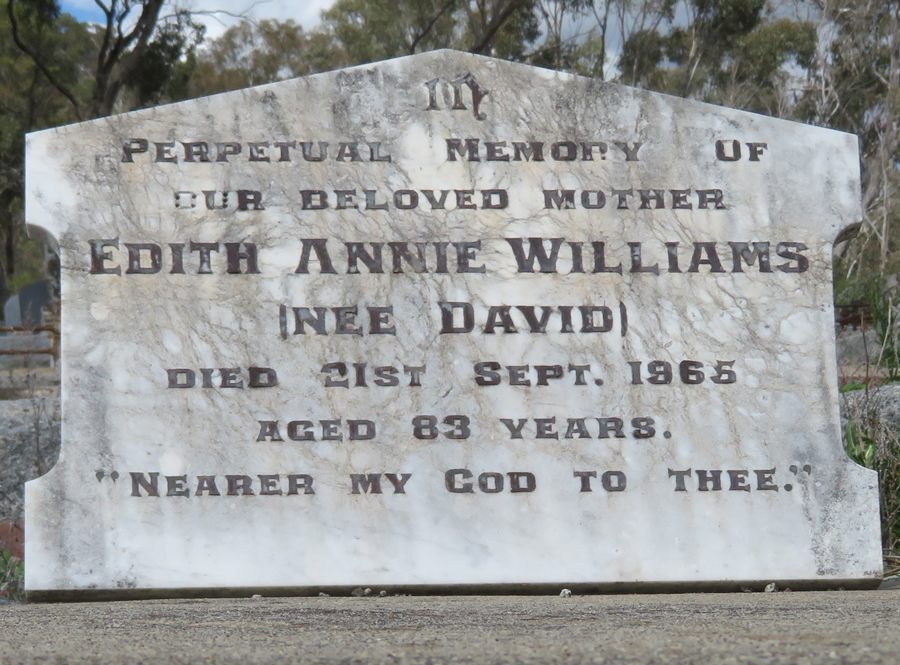
Edith David (1881–1965)

The Conservatory, Fitzroy Gardens, Melbourne – O'Connor sculpture of Mary Gilbert

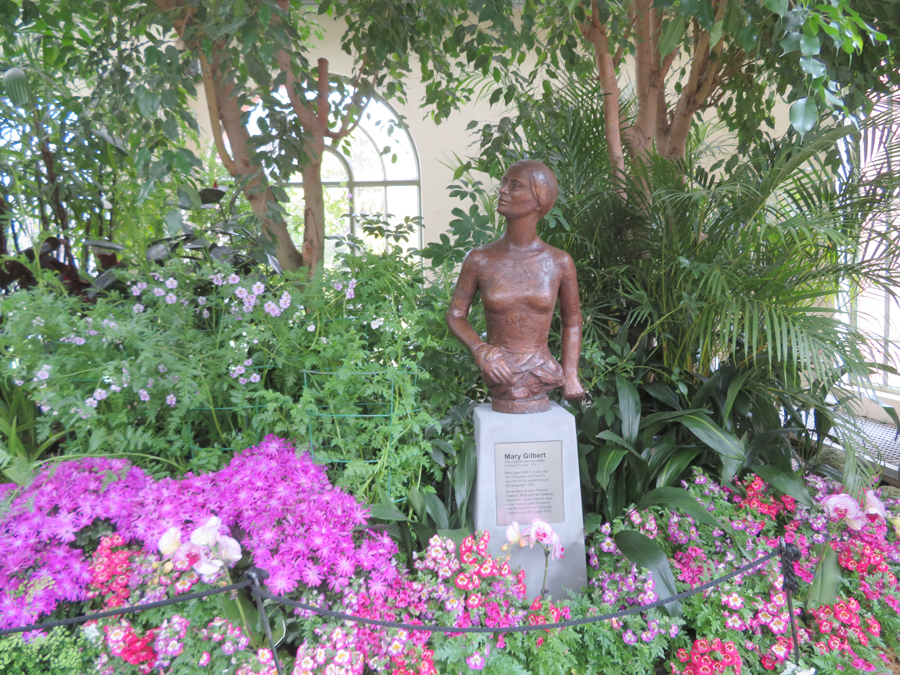
Interior of the Conservatory with sculpture of Mary Gilbert

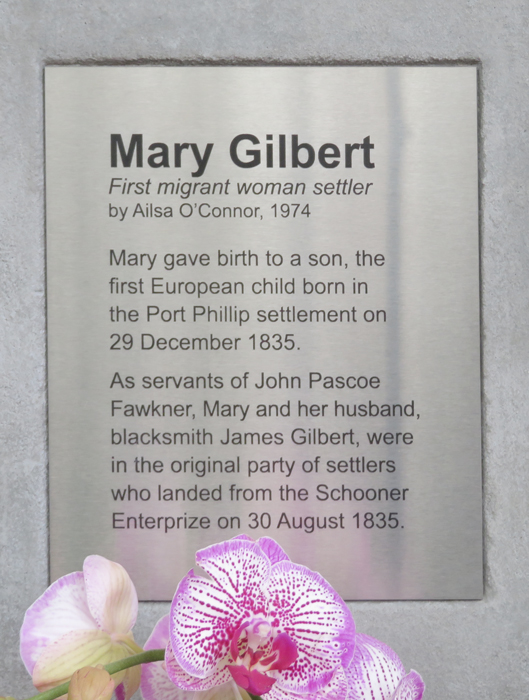
Mary Gilbert close-up of new plaque in 2018

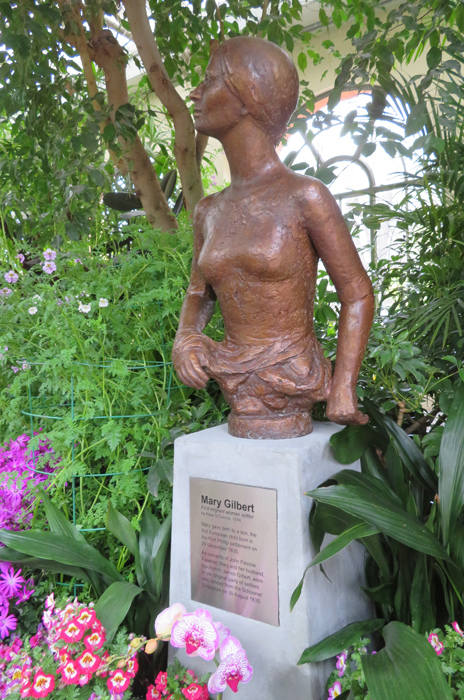
Mary Gilbert side view

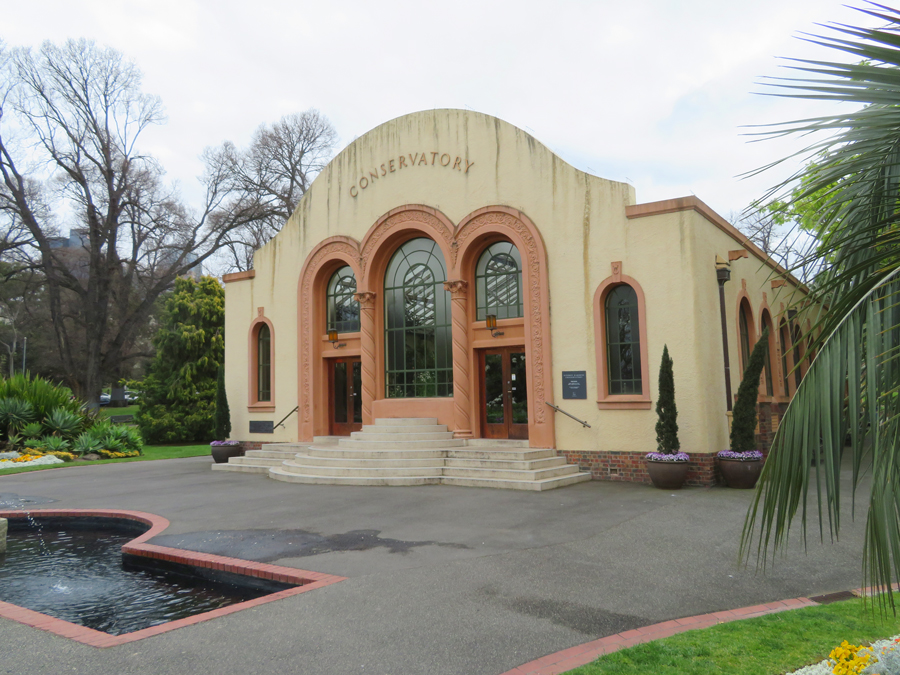
Conservatory, Fitzroy Gardens, Melbourne, Victoria, Australia
