= Peter Purves Smith =

Australian painter (1912–1949)

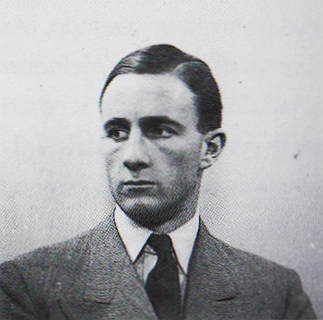
- Peter Purves Smith, photographed by Russell Drysdale, 1938
- Born: Charles Roderick Purves Smith; 26 March 1912; East Melbourne, Victoria, Australia
- Died: 23 July 1949 (aged 37); Heidelberg, Victoria, Australia
- Known for: Painting
- Notable work: Kangaroo Hunt; The Nazis, Nuremberg; The Diplomats

Peter Purves Smith (26 March 1912 – 23 July 1949), born Charles Roderick Purves Smith, was an Australian painter. Born in Melbourne, Purves Smith studied at the Grosvenor School of Modern Art in London and under progressive art teacher George Bell in Melbourne.

In his student years, Purves Smith emerged as a uniquely confident artist. He was the first modern artist in Australia to paint historical Australian subjects, including the explorers Burke and Wills, and was among the first Australian artists to have direct contact with the international Surrealist movement. He travelled throughout Europe in the late 1930s, painting many of his most celebrated works in Paris. In 1941, art critic Clive Turnbull identified Purves Smith, William Dobell, and Purves Smith's close friend Russell Drysdale as "the three most significant Australian artists" of the era. However, Purves Smith's artistic career was put on hold while he served in World War II, and later by illness. He died in 1949, leaving behind a small yet influential body of work.

== Early life and education ==
Peter Purves Smith was born on 26 March 1912 in East Melbourne, the second child and only son of Victorian-born graziers William Purves Smith and Loe Purves Smith. The family's male line in Australia extends back to Peter's grandfather Thomas Smith (1830–87), who emigrated from Darnick, Roxburghshire, in the Scottish Borders to the Colony of Victoria during the early days of the Victorian gold rush in 1854. Thomas rapidly prospered, establishing various businesses and acquiring farming properties and inner Melbourne mansions. William—although distant from Thomas—took to his father's alternating lifestyle of rural farming and leisured vacations in the city. By 1905, William had married Laura (Loe) Chapman and was wool-growing at Dwarroon, outside Warrnambool. They raised their children Alison (known as Jocelyn) and Peter in various places throughout Victoria, never settling permanently in one place. Purves Smith attended a prep school in England and Geelong Grammar School in Australia, alongside future artist and friend Russell Drysdale. In order to please his father, Peter entered the Royal Australian Naval College in 1926, but dropped out three years later to become a jackaroo near Hay by the Murrumbidgee River. William Purves Smith committed suicide on Christmas Eve, 1932.

Following his father's suicide, Peter travelled extensively throughout Europe. In England, 1934, Purves Smith's sister Jocelyn noticed his hobby of drawing, and suggested he attend an art school. He studied under Iain Macnab at Grosvenor School of Modern Art in 1935, and back in Australia under George Bell at the Bourke Street Studio School. There he met again old Geelong friend Russell Drysdale, and fellow Bell student Maisie Newbold, whom he married in 1946 at Toorak with Drysdale as best man. Drysdale, too, had been a jackaroo, and both artists worked closely together and influenced each other's art. Apart from his teachers and Drysdale, Amedeo Modigliani, Paul Nash, Henri Rousseau, Maurice Utrillo, Christopher Wood and surrealism impacted what would become Purves Smith's highly personal style.

=== Student works ===
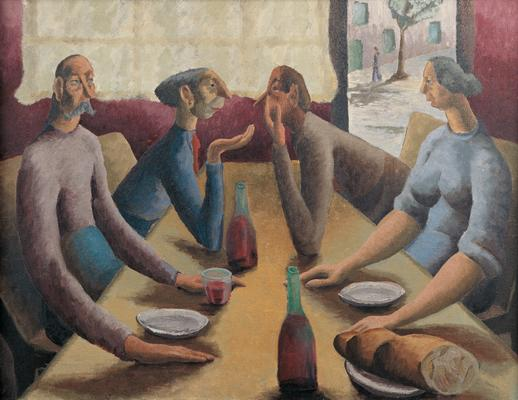
French Café, 1936, Art Gallery of South Australia

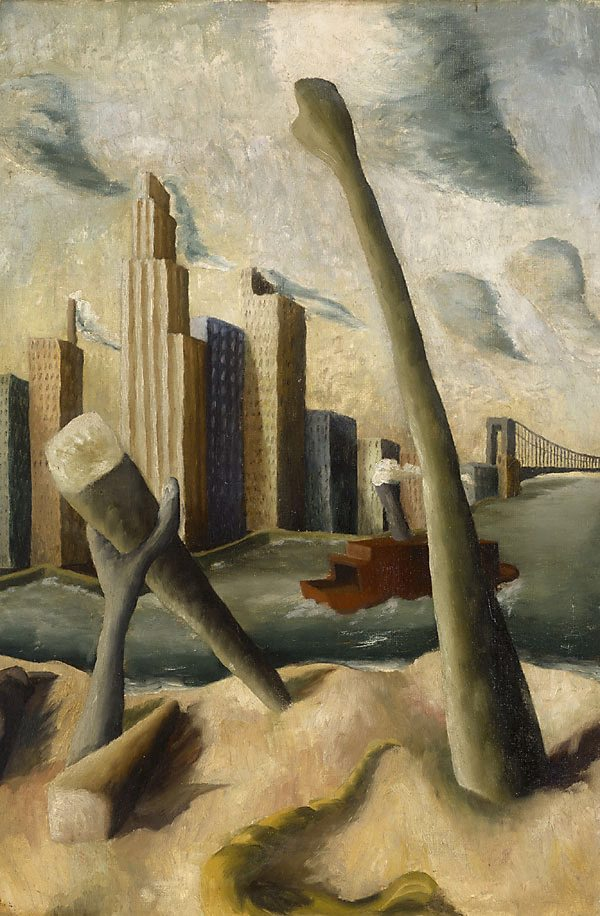
New York, 1936, Art Gallery of New South Wales

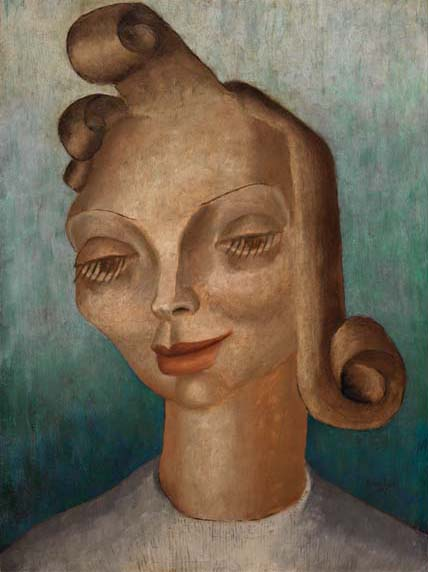
Lucile, 1937, Queensland Art Gallery

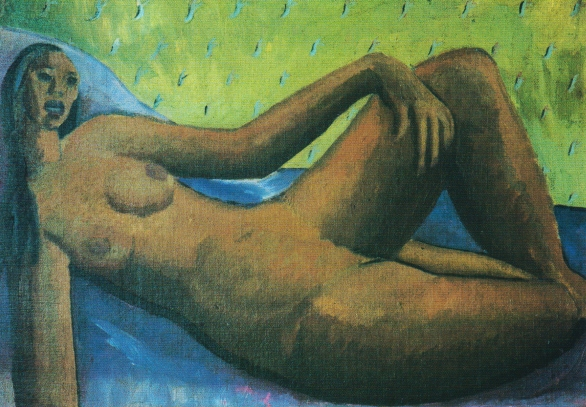
Nude, 1937, Heide Museum of Modern Art

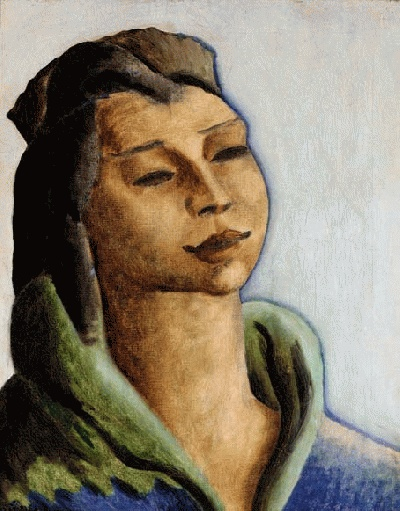
Blue Head, 1937, Art Gallery of South Australia

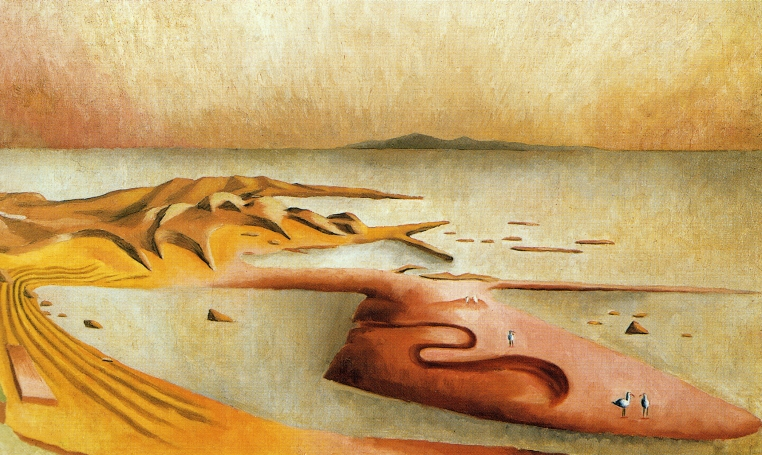
Ricketts Point, 1937, Art Gallery of South Australia

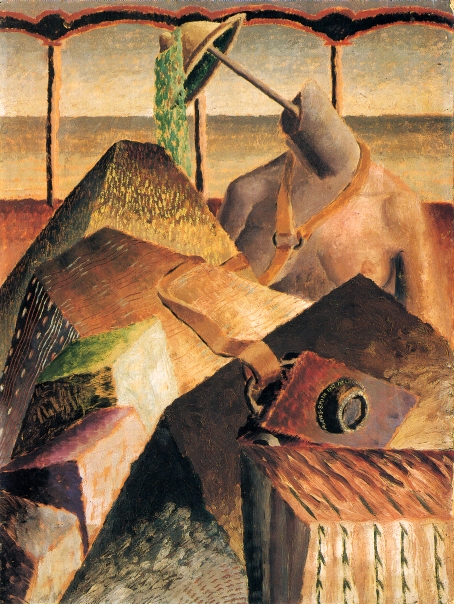
Topee, 1937, National Gallery of Australia

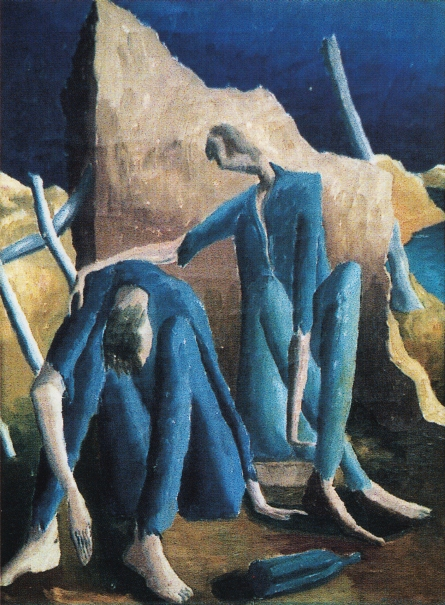
Burke and Wills (The Perish), 1937, Benalla Art Gallery

== Work and travel ==
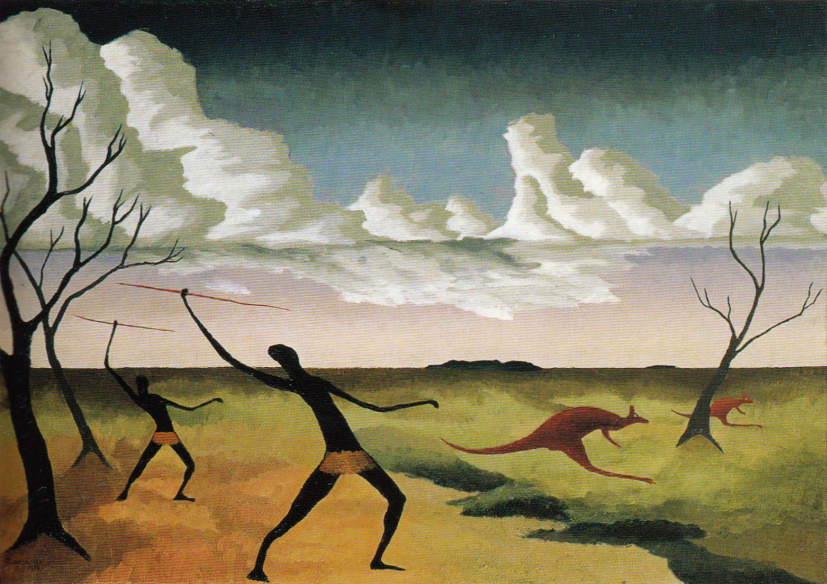
Kangaroo Hunt, 1938, Museum of Modern Art (New York)

Throughout the late 1930s, Purves Smith painted in London and Paris, which critic Bernard William Smith cites as his most important era. Not only did Purves Smith paint his new physical surroundings (1939's Early Morning in Paris) and political environment (1938's The Nazis, Nuremberg), but also recalled works of the Australian landscape, namely Kangaroo Hunt (1938), which was included in the touring exhibition Art of Australia 1788-1941, and acquired by the Museum of Modern Art, New York. In 1939, art critic Gino Nibbi said "Purves Smith seems one of the most qualified at the present time to give some allegorical interpretations of the virgin appearance of the Australian landscape". He painted a scene from the Burke and Wills expedition in 1937 (several years before Sidney Nolan began his Burke & Wills series), and the "pole-like trees, elongated figures, sheets of iron, and low horizons" of his early 1940 Drought landscapes anticipated "in more ways than one" the future direction of Drysdale's art. According to art historian Sasha Grishin, Purves Smith's "apocalyptic" depictions of Australia's desolate interior convey a fear of vast space, and employ a "recognizable Australian setting to express both personal, as well as broader social anxieties" in the lead up to war.

== World War II ==
Germany invaded Poland on 1 September 1939, and Britain, which had made an alliance with Poland in August, declared war. During this time, Purves Smith was vacationing in California with his mother; the outbreak of war caused him to make a detour to the Grand Canyon, about which he wrote to Maisie in a characteristically facetious tone: "If one is to die gloriously one might as well see a few things first". He returned to London in October and tried to enlist in the British army, but was told to wait. During the intervening months his state of mind became "paralytic" and he withdrew from social life. Maisie, now back in Melbourne, urged Peter to return to Australia. Despite missing Maisie and suffering from homesickness, he successfully joined up in May 1940.

Purves Smith's first role in the army was to transport petrol and military supplies across the south of England. Life in the training camps was mentally numbing, and before each academic exam Purves Smith feared being given the bum's rush. In September 1941, having volunteered for a posting abroad, he went on active service in West Africa (then known by soldiers as the "white man's grave"). Purves Smith was a lieutenant stationed in Nigeria with the West African Forces' 11th General Transport Company. Not much is known about his time there as the postal censor checked mail from the front for military information. What remains of Purves Smith's letters describes the day-to-day aspects of life in the jungle, including dashes into the African wilds and his growing revulsion at body odour and the sight of sweat. Detailed histories of the West Africa Campaign indicate his company travelled along the Takoradi supply route, which was established in August 1940 as a means of bypassing Vichy French territories to reach upper Egypt. The route lasted until September 1943, coinciding with the end of Purves Smith's service in Africa. Much later, Purves Smith painted a memory of Chad in West Africa (1948, National Gallery of Victoria).

In 1944, he was one of Major General Orde Wingate's "chindits" behind Japanese lines in Burma. Immediately after the war, he was hospitalised with tuberculosis.

== Return to Melbourne ==
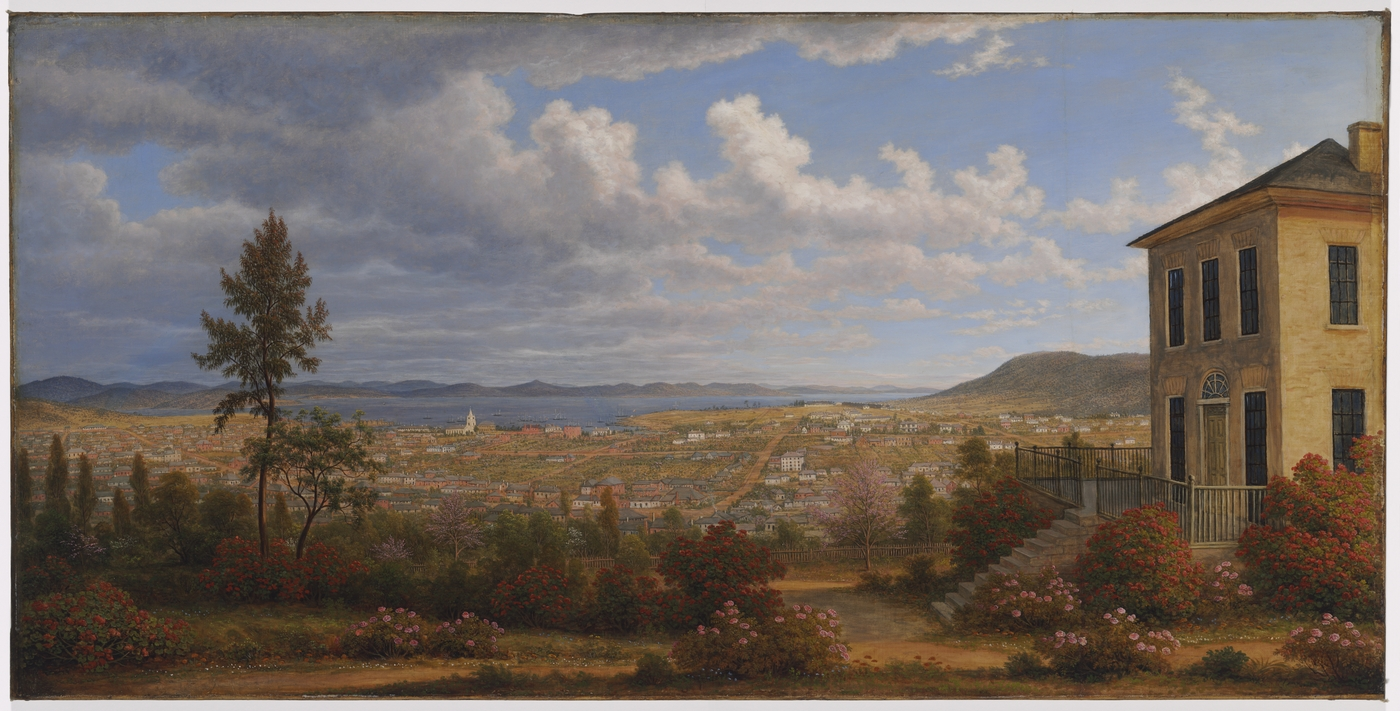
John Glover, Hobart Town, taken from the garden where I lived, 1832, Tasmanian Museum and Art Gallery. Glover included his place of residence in several key landscapes.

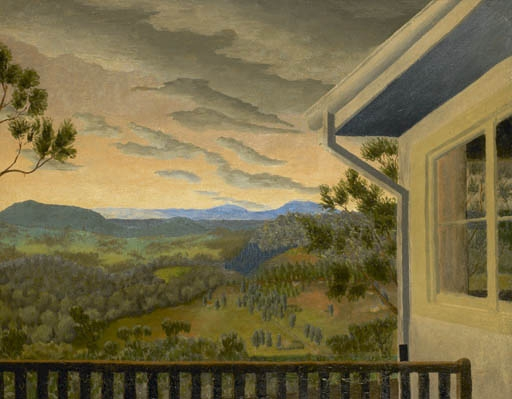
Glover may have inspired Purves Smith's final oil painting, Sassafras, 1948, private collection

In May 1946, he returned to Australia and also to painting with a far more abstract approach. Significant works from this period are The Pleading Butcher and Woman Eating Duck, both painted in 1948 and now held at the National Gallery of Australia. Purves Smith's final oil painting was a landscape painted from the perspective of his home in Sassafras, in the Dandenong Ranges. It was an attempt to "paint like the old boys", a reference to early Australian colonial artists such as John Glover.

=== Later works ===
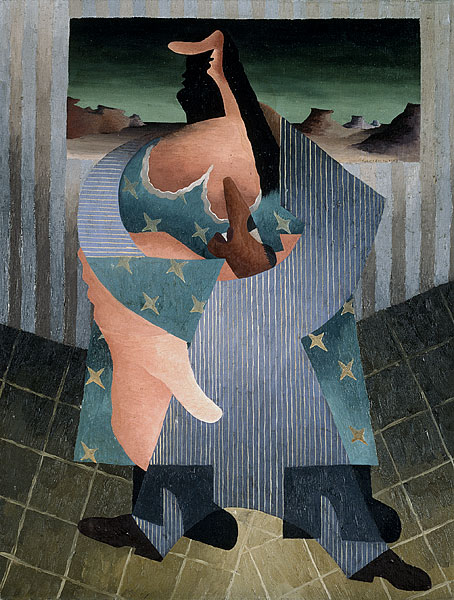
The Pleading Butcher, 1948, National Gallery of Australia

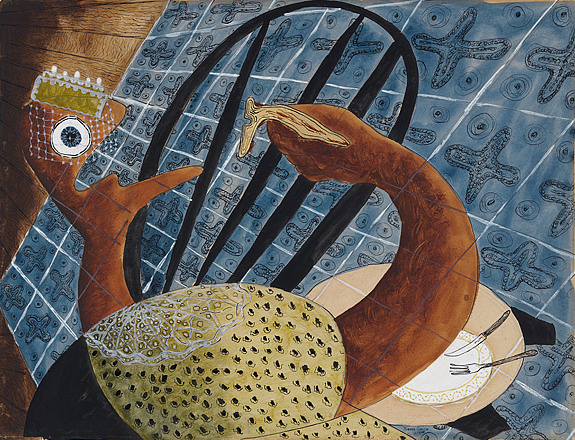
Woman Eating Duck, 1948, National Gallery of Australia

== Death and recognition ==
Peter Purves Smith was hospitalised in 1948, and later drafted to the Heidelberg Repatriation Hospital for major lung surgery. He died of post-operative shock the next day, 23 July 1949, and was cremated. Despite his small oeuvre of less than 100 paintings and posthumous descent into relative obscurity, Purves Smith emerged as a celebrated artist—influencing many of his contemporaries—and has been recognised as "the first of the young modern artists to look inquiringly at the Australianness of country life". His use of surreal elements, colloquial themes and at times biting satire set precedent for the work of the Melbourne-based Angry Penguins in the mid to late 1940s. Two retrospective exhibitions were held in Melbourne: one at the Stanley Coe Gallery in 1950, and the other at the Joseph Brown Gallery in 1976. A touring exhibition of his work commenced in 2001 following the publication of Mary Eagle's biography Peter Purves Smith: A Painter in Peace and War.

George Bell wrote an obituary for him in The Sun, saying Purves Smith

... was and would have remained unique in Australian art. None other has combined such a wealth of qualities, alertness of imagination always revealing something unexpected, an adult point of view and technical ability, all infused by a warm humanity and seasoned by a puckish humour which was his alone.

— George Bell

Following the death of Russell Drysdale's wife in 1963, Drysdale married Maisie Purves Smith in 1964. In March 2000, burglars stole two paintings by Peter Purves Smith from Maisie's home in Woy Woy on the Central Coast, as well as a Drysdale painting which was given to Maisie as a gift soon after Peter's death. The works were valued at $350,000.

Peter Purves Smith's 1938 painting The Pond was the subject of an ekphrastic poem by scholar Peter Steele in the 2006 book The Whispering Gallery: Art into Poetry. In 2008, several of Purves Smith's works were included in the exhibition Australian Surrealism: the Agapitos/Wilson Collection, held at the National Gallery of Australia, and his major student work New York was shown in the 2008 Powerhouse Museum exhibition Modern Times. Purves Smith is also represented in the National Gallery of Victoria's Joseph Brown Collection, a survey of Australian art from its colonial beginnings to contemporary times. Of the collection, former Christie's director of art sales Jon Dwyer said "There are many iconic pictures, including von Guerards, some great Streetons and McCubbins - and arguably the best work Peter Purves Smith ever painted, which is my favourite." Lucile, Purves Smith's 1937 portrait of Melbourne socialite Lucile Stephens (daughter of Henry Douglas Stephens), was acquired in 2011 by the Queensland Art Gallery through its Foundation Appeal, and is deemed by the gallery to be a collection highlight.

== Gallery ==
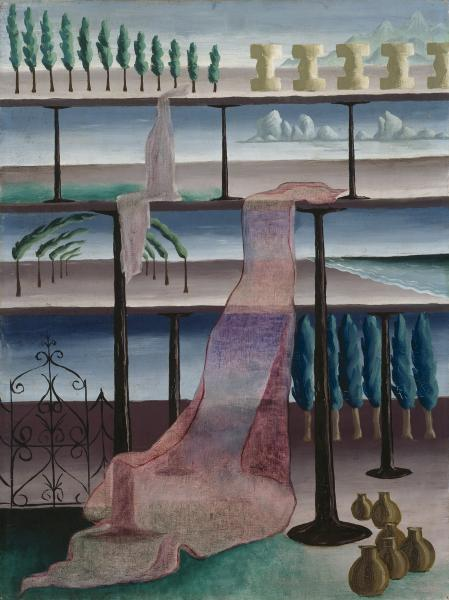
Surrealist Landscape, 1938, National Gallery of Victoria

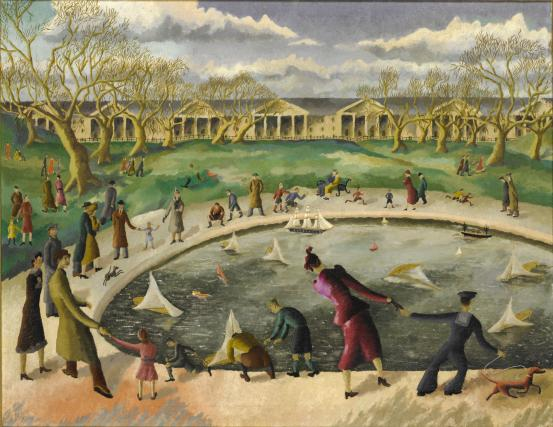
The Pond, 1938, Ian Potter Centre

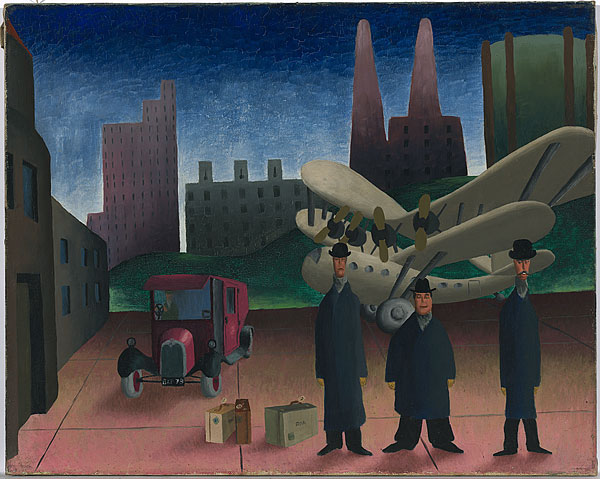
The Diplomats, 1939, National Gallery of Australia
