= Elise Grilli =

American art critic

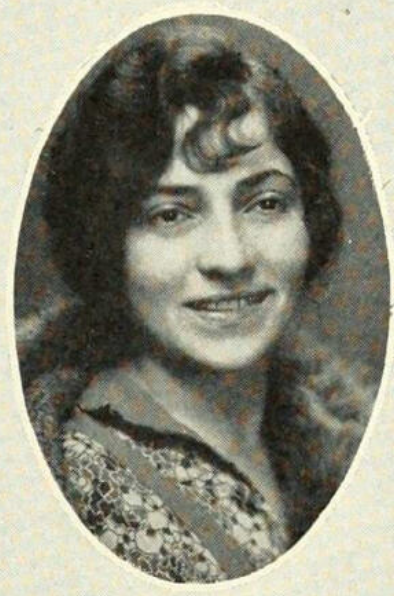
- Traunstein, from the 1929 yearbook of Barnard College
- Born: Elsa Traunstein; August 4, 1906; Austria
- Died: November 13, 1969 (age 63); Los Angeles, California, U.S.
- Other name: Elsie Traunstein
- Occupations: Art critic, college professor, columnist, lecturer

Elise Traunstein Grilli (August 4, 1906 – November 13, 1969), born Elsa Traunstein, was an American art critic, professor, columnist, and lecturer based in Japan from 1947 to 1969.

== Early life and education ==
Traunstein was born in Austria, and raised in the New Jersey, the daughter of Herman Traunstein. She graduated from Barnard College in 1929, and completed a master's degree at Columbia University in 1932. In college she was assistant editor of the Barnard Bulletin, and won an essay contest sponsored by the College Art Association. She also studied at the Sorbonne in Paris.

== Career ==
Grilli moved to Japan with her family after World War II, when her husband worked with the Allied Occupation Forces in Tokyo. She was a professor of art at Sophia University, and wrote art reviews for The Japan Times, an English-language daily newspaper. She lectured and organized lectures on art for the International Art Society in Tokyo.

In 1964 Grilli was a visiting lecturer in East Asian art at Earlham College in Indiana, and organized an exhibit of her own collection of Japanese art at the campus. In 1965 and 1966 she made a lecture tour in Europe and the Middle East. She lectured about art in Hawaii in 1966. She also taught at UCLA.

John Canaday of The New York Times Book Review called Grilli's The Art of the Japanese Screen "the best art book to have come my way in 1970".

== Publications ==
- Kakuzo Okakura, The Book of Tea (1956, foreword and biographical sketch)
- "Saburo Hasegawa as a Leader of Modern Art in Japan" (1957)
- Japanese Picture Scrolls (1959)
- Sharaku (1959)
- "Art Exhibitions in Tokyo" (1959)
- "Gloomy Show by Kodo, Nika" (1959)
- "New Trends in Japanese Painting" (1960)
- Golden Screen Paintings of Japan (1961)
- "Hidai: Ancient Ink in a New Guise" (1965)
- The Art of the Japanese Screen (1970)

== Personal life ==
Traunstein married Italian-born music critic Marcel F. Grilli. They had two children, Peter and Diana. She died from a liver disease in Los Angeles, in 1969, at the age of 63.
