= Giornale del Popolo =

Italian-language Swiss newspaper

Giornale del Popolo (English: People's Newspaper)
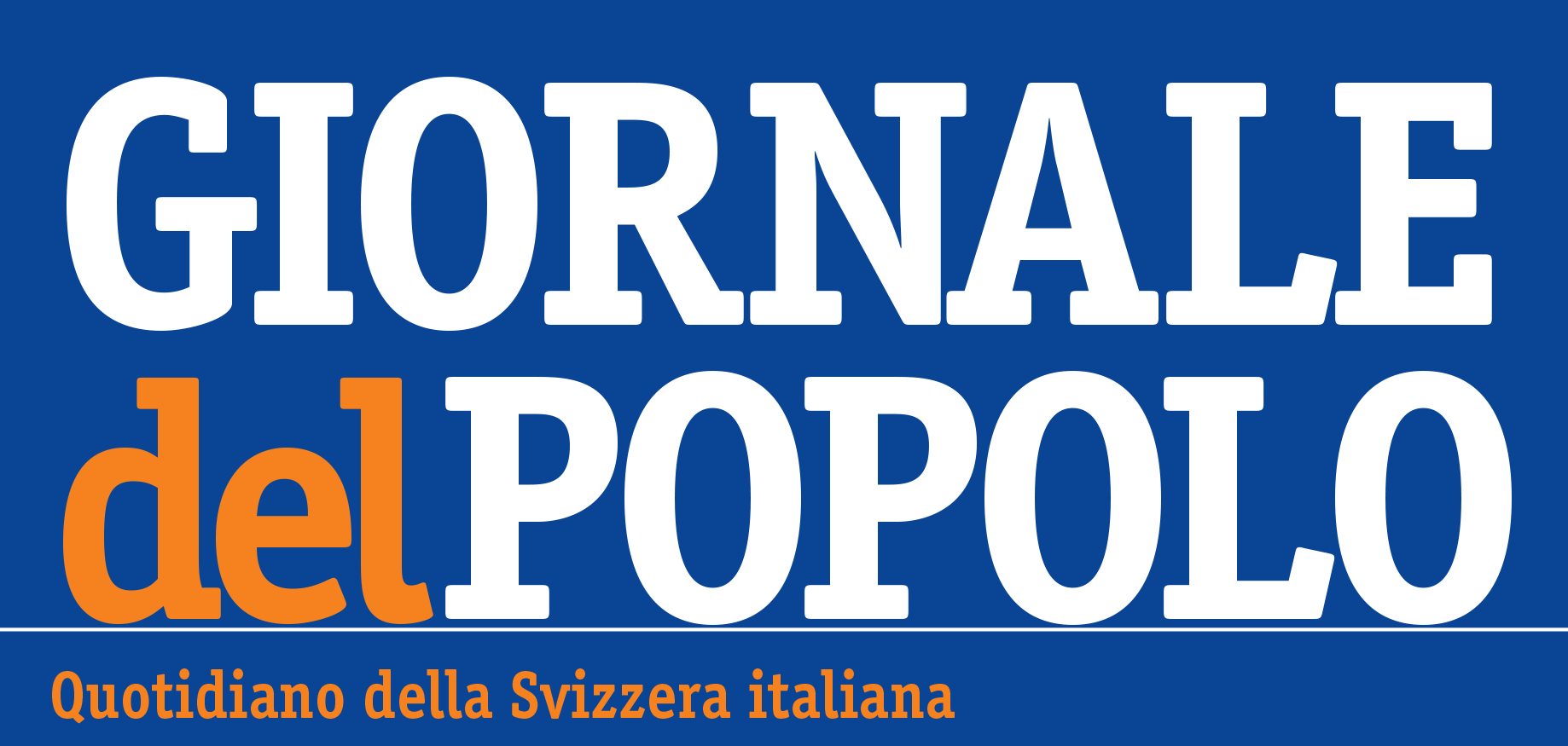
- Type: Daily newspaper
- Format: Broadsheet
- Publisher: Nuova Società editrice del Giornale del Popolo SA
- Editor-in-chief: Gregorio Schira
- Founded: 1926
- Ceased publication: 18 May 2018
- Language: Italian
- Headquarters: Lugano
- Country: Switzerland
- ISSN: 1660-9662
- OCLC number: 173873718
- Website: gdp.ch

The Giornale del Popolo was a Swiss daily newspaper published in the Italian language and based in Lugano, Switzerland.

== History and profile ==
The Giornale del Popolo was founded in 1926. After 92 years of history, its publication ceased in 2018 due to the decline of newspapers and a downturn in ad revenue.

As of 2018 the newspaper had an estimated audience of more than 35,000 daily readers.
