= Il Giornale Italiano =

Italian-language Australian newspaper

Il Giornale Italiano (The Italian Journal)
- Type: Weekly newspaper
- Founded: 19 March 1932
- Language: Italian
- Headquarters: Sydney, Australia

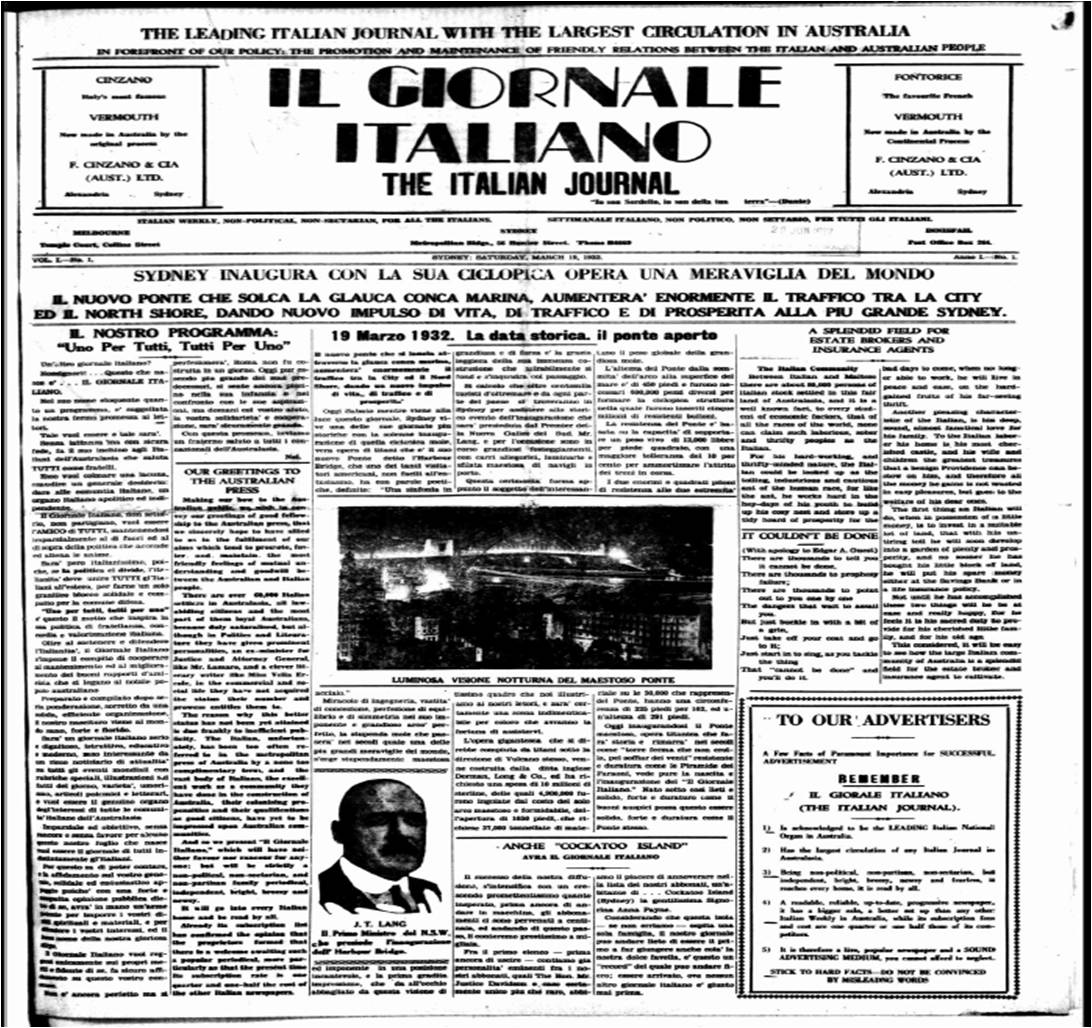
Latest article Il Giornale Italiano, 19 March 1932

Il Giornale Italiano (The Italian Journal) commenced publication on 19 March 1932. Although published in Sydney it included news from throughout Australia. Il Giornale Italiano had a wide circulation, with 8,000 copies sold each week. Published weekly, from June 1938, Il Giornale Italiano included an English Section with its own separate masthead.

By the late 1920s, many thousands of Italian workers had immigrated to Australia. At this time, financial support for Italian-language newspapers was provided by the Fascist regime in Italy and Fascist clubs existed across Australia.

According to Robert Pascoe, the style of language used in Il Giornale Italiano was "officious and uncompromisingly 'pure'… Dialects were…dismissed as obsolescent by the Mussolini government, so an insistence of Standard Italian in a stilted form was part of the purpose of such a newspaper".

Later editions of Il Giornale Italiano included a women's section supplement, La donna, la casa, il bambino.

== Digitisation ==
Il Giornale Italiano has been digitised as part of the Australian Newspapers Digitisation Program project of the National Library of Australia.

== See also ==
- List of newspapers in Australia
