= Polly Hurry =

Australian artist (1883–1963)

- John Farmer (1937) Polly Hurry, oil on canvas 50cm x 40 cm
- Born: 2 May 1883; Kyneton
- Died: 5 August 1963 (aged 80); Frankston
- Known for: Painting
- Movement: Australian Tonalist
- Spouse: John Farmer

Polly Hurry (2 May, 1883, Kyneton - 5 August 1963, Frankston), was an Australian painter. She was a founding member of the Australian Tonalist movement and part of the Twenty Melbourne Painters Society.

== Early life ==
Described in a 2009 review by Sasha Grishin as “a South Australian Meldrumite who has been almost totally forgotten,” Mary 'Polly' Hurry in fact was born in Kyneton, Victoria, on 2 May, 1883, daughter of Henry Hurry and Mary Herring and the middle child of two siblings, Maurice and George. She spent her early years there at the family home South Lodge, 29 Donnithorne Street, then was educated at Ruyton Girls' School, Kew.

== Training ==
Later, at the Kyneton School of Mines, Hurry took lessons in drawing and wood carving, then studied watercolour painting with the Scottish-born artist, John Mather. During a camping holiday she met several artists, who like Mather were associates of the tonalist Max Meldrum, and decided to take up art seriously. She began drawing from life at Melbourne's 1859 Old Temple Court building where studios were occupied by students of Frederick McCubbin; Jessie Traill, Dora Wilson, Janet Cumbrae Stewart, Norah Gurdon and A. M. E. Bale; before approaching Meldrum to join his studio as one of the first of his pupils, alongside Harry McClelland.

== Australian tonalist artist ==
Hurry regarded Meldrum as the most important influence on her artistic development, but the association also shaped her personal life; in Meldrum’s studio she met John Farmer whom she married on 13 August 1921. Farmer (1897-1989) was a close friend of fellow student 10 years younger, Justus Jorgensen, when both attended the National Gallery School in 1914, where he also met Clarice Beckett and Colin Colahan. Brought up in a large family in Brunswick, Farmer worked as a scenery painter for J. C. Williamson's Ltd. Richard McCullin, a drawing master at the Gallery School, suggested that students might be interested in going to hear a lecture in 1917 by controversial young painter, Max Meldrum, who argued that "the art of painting is a pure science - the science of optical analysis".

Hurry became a founding member of the original Twenty Melbourne Painters Society — Jas Stuart Anderson, Alice Bale, Elsie Barlow, Alexander Colquhoun, George Colville, Edith Downing, Bernice Edwell, William Frater, Henrietta Maria Gulliver, Carl Hampel, C. E. James, Richard McCann, Bertha Merfield, A. E. Newbury, Clara Southern, Ruth Sutherland, Jo Sweatman, Isobel Tweddle, and Rose A. Walker — all supporters and students of Meldrum, which split from the Victorian Artists Society in protest at his defeat in the 1918 election for its president. In 1919, the breakaway group held their first exhibition. Twenty Melbourne Painters Society founding Secretary A. M. E. Bale declared:

"We desire nothing but sincerity and a humble study of nature, from which alone all art, whether decorative or realistic, draws any enduring life".

Also in 1921, Hurry entered the inaugural Archibald Prize, in which 41 works were submitted and all exhibited from 17 January 1922 for two months. The Prize was awarded to W. B. McInnes, but no catalogue for the 1921 exhibition has been found, and the subject of the work submitted by Hurry is not known.

The couple shared one of the purpose-built studios (Studio 2) at the 1888 Grosvenor Chambers, 9 Collins Street, Melbourne (its name a direct reference to Grosvenor Gallery of London) occupied also at various times by Meldrum, Tom Roberts, Frederick McCubbin, Arthur Streeton, Percival Ball, Charles Francis Summers, Clara Southern, Jane Sutherland, Charles Conder, E. Phillips Fox, John Longstaff, Girolamo Nerli, Louis Abrahams, Rose A. Walker, George Lambert, and Ola Cohn. Frequent visitors to the studio were Janet Cumbrae Stewart, Norah Gurdon, Dora L. Wilson (who also had a studio in the building), Jessie Traill, Norah Wilkie and Margaret Pestell.

== Asia ==
For their honeymoon the Farmers left via Hong Kong for China, visiting Shanghai and Peking, and Japan via Korea, to paint. An oft-repeated perception is that they were among the first few Australian artists to do so, though Ellis Rowan (1848-1922), Tenison Woods and Godfrey Miller preceded them, and Asian art was being collected in Australian museums from 1904. The result is Hurry's Temple Lantern at Nikko, which handles the challenging geometry of the subject’s forms, and its spatial relations with two Japanese maple trunks that embrace it, with planes confidently rendered, following Meldrum's principles, in incremental, limited steps of earth and grey tones, against an abstracted background of soft-focus greens.

Not long after their return to Australia, they moved to Olinda, quite close to Jorgensen’s brother, Elef, who was the doctor in Belgrave, and were close neighbours of Arthur Streeton. Justus Jorgenson designed Farmer's house, named Miyako, to include a very large open room, not dissimilar to the Elef Jorgensen’s’ Big Room' and thus served as an artists' retreat for many of the Meldrum students. Clarice Beckett was staying when Hurry and Farmer conducted a formal Japanese tea ceremony and also practised the ancient art of ikebana, inspiring Beckett’s painting of a vase of gladioli, a rare and large example of Beckett working in the still life genre.

== European residency and return to Australia ==
In late 1923, inviting Meldrum and his family to stay in their house, Hurry and her husband set out for Europe, arriving first of all in Paris, where they were reunited with the Jorgensons and the Colquhouns. She painted two copies after Velasquez (whose technique Meldrum emulated) in the Louvre over February to May 1924. They divided their time in Europe between France; first in a studio in Montparnasse preparing works accepted into the Salon d'Automne and the winter salon; and lodgings in St John's Wood near Regent's Park in London, where Hurry had some success with two portraits being exhibited at the Royal Society of Portrait Painters. They made a pilgrimage to Millet’s studio at Fontaineblau, following his footsteps in the forest and painting around Barbizon, and travelled south to the French Riviera and painted at the coastal city of Nice. Time was also spent in Holland to see Rembrandt works.

Returning to Australia in 1926, Hurry showed 57 works jointly with Farmer whose taste for Old Masters was reinforced by his encounters with Modernism in Europe, and, after her election to the Melbourne Society of Woman Painters and Sculptors she exhibited with them from 1927 to 1962. Also with Farmer in 1927 she showed "thumbnail sketches" in Margaret MacLean's studio gallery, 450 Collins Street with Elsie Barlow, Jessie Traill, Nora Gurdon, Rose A. Walker, Hilda Travers; artists identified by a reviewer as all "well-known".

The couple returned to Paris and London 1932–35 and she found success at the French Salon in Paris in 1933, and still while away in 1934 showed her works alongside Max Meldrum, Clarice Beckett, Alma Figuerola, Justus Jorgenson and Percy Leason at the Athenaeum Gallery in Melbourne.

Contemporaneous commentary on her career frequently attaches her to her husband. One 1939 Age article identifies her as "Miss Polly Hurry", while in the same year another in The Argus notes that "Mrs John Farmer (P. Hurry) has a cottage at Olinda as well as a studio in the city but despite her country setting she paints mostly portraits"; referring to the Grosvenor Chambers which she occupied until 1959, and where during WWII she showed in a short charity exhibition 6–11 May 1941. She also made it available to the Melbourne Society of Women Painters and Sculptors as their volunteer headquarters in which they made and sold handcrafts, fashion and art to raise money for the war effort and learned and practised first aid drills, as documented by Sybil Craig’s gouache in the National Gallery of Australia.

== Reception ==
Hurry concentrated on portraiture and still life, and earlier in her career painted some landscapes, all of which attracted commentary and criticism.

As early as 1916 reviewers of Victorian Artists' Society shows praised her "graceful touch [which] reveals a sympathetic observer in Nature's storehouse," and noted that;

"The continued success of Miss Hurry is gratifying, as noted in two delicate examples, Emu Bay and Back Road to Woodend both touching a high level."

In 1920 The Argus, writing of her contribution to the Twenty Melbourne Painters' second exhibition, declared that "Miss P. Hurry shows a portrait of Miss Marie Ney, which is one of the most striking things on view." On the couple's return from Europe in 1926, The Argus reported that;

"Mrs Farmer shows landscapes, portraits, and still life, and she also has copied from the old masters, in her case Velasquez, and she hangs a study of the Infanta Marguerite by that painter. Mrs Farmer's portraits, while bold in the handling of the planes, fail somewhat in the colour, and the flesh tones are often unnaturally yellow. This is strongly in evidence in Minnie, a portrait exhibited at the Royal Society of Portrait Painters. Her best portrait is to be observed in the portrait The Polish Girl. Among the still life paintings a well handled study of Hydrangeas calls for specially favourable comment. Of the landscapes, Side Street, Amersham, Snow on the Seine, Sea Mist on the Cornish Coast, Cochrane St St John's Wood, and Summer in the Park are excellent examples, and reveal a sincere seeking after truth of atmospheric effect."

Her near-life-size portrait Miss Joyce Wingate of 1929, which is (since 1987) in the collection of the V&A, was in an October 1929 show at the Athenaeum of The Twenty Melbourne Painters, then numbering 27 as remarked by The Bulletin reviewer who describes “P. Hurry (Mrs. Farmer)” having caught her subject “in a yellow dress and an arresting posture, and painted them with vim.”

However her neighbour in Olinda Arthur Streeton, then in his sixties while art critic for The Argus from 1929 to 1935, continually expressed discontent with Hurry's quality of finish, which was coloured by his prejudices about the Meldrumite perceptual art method, with negative remarks about her work in the Twenty Melbourne Painters show of September 1932. Of a Melbourne Society of Women Painters exhibition in October that year, he comments that;

"The central position is occupied bv No. 63, Madame, a large canvas by P. Hurry who seems to be content with a first large "lay-in" of the subject. With continued sittings the work could he improved in relative light and dark or tonal values."

Hurry's portrait Miss Joyce Wingate reappeared in a 1934 exhibition of the Melbourne Society of Women Painters and a reviewer marks it

“an example of special interest”…”the full length standing figure of a girl in yellow dress, by Polly Hurry, in which a graceful motive and a harmonious color scheme work together for good. The success of this picture just misses assurance through the imperfect treatment of the face, which is not carried sufficiently far to balance the handling of the dress and other accessories.”

In 1937, Harold Herbert in reviewing a brief June exhibition at the Athenaeum by the couple with sculptor John W. Elischer.

"P. Hurry (Mrs. John Farmer), in very sincere impressions, is able to convey colour light, and tone convincingly in portraits and portrait groups. Smudgy edges, involving lack of valuable accentuation of textures, rob her pictures of complete effectiveness. Delicate appreciation of such things were thoroughly practised by the painters of years ago. These matters are treated with scant consideration by artists to-day. Mrs. Farmer is a follower of the Meldrum School, so is Mr John Farmer, who shows in this home exhibition. Portrait of An Old Lady is a good example of her powers in the art of portraiture and also The Lady in White. The latter, a virile, poster-like sketch, carries splendidly, viewed from across the gallery. It lacks refinement technically. Perhaps she is not interested in this side of her art."

Herbert seems to temper this opinion in his review shortly thereafter of the 28th annual exhibition of the Society of Women Painters in noting how Hurry in "two studies in the Meldrum manner demonstrates again her undoubted ability."

One of Hurry's more celebrated subjects, in a portrait held in the Castlemaine Art Museum, is the German-Jewish scholar Ursula Hoff, who migrated to Melbourne in 1939 as the first individual with professional qualifications in art history and curatorship to be employed in an art gallery or museum in Australia, working at the National Gallery of Victoria for thirty years.

A Bulletin reviewer of a show of “Meldrum’s disciples” a year later, regards Hurry’s work as of similar stuff to her teacher’s other older students. Though still exhibiting with the Twenty in 1959, four years before her death, in Arnold Shore’s review her profile is still bound to Farmer’s;

“Still-life studies by John Farmer and Polly Hurry are equally distinguished by unclamant virtues.”

In a review of Misty Moderns: Australian Tonalists 1915-1950, curated by Tracey Lock-Weir in 2008, critic John McDonald singles out Farmer, Hurry and Colquhoun as artists for;

“impressive work in this show - work that goes beyond the simple data of close observation and touches the viewer's imagination. Oddly enough, Meldrum often appears less accomplished than his students. This may be because he lacked that quality whose existence he always denied: talent. It may be because he applied his methods in more rigorous fashion.”

== Death ==
For health reasons Hurry moved from Olinda to Frankston in 1954, where she died 5 August, 1963, at 80 years old, survived by Farmer, who was 14 years her junior, and her brother Maurice, a solicitor in Kyneton. She was cremated at Fawkner Crematorium and Memorial Park on 7 August.

== Legacy ==
Hurry was a foundation member of the Twenty Melbourne Painters, exhibited with them from 1919 to 1963 and was made a life member in 1961. She exhibited with the Victorian Artists' Society from 1961 until the late 1930s, and with the Melbourne Society of Women Painters and Sculptors from 1927 to 1962.

In 1978 a street in the Canberra suburb of Chisholm was named Hurry Place in her honour.

In 2009 Hurry was included in the retrospective exhibition Misty moderns: Australian Tonalists 1915–1950.

== Exhibitions ==
- 1916 Kyneton Technical School, exhibition of portraits made of locals on demand by Hurry, Dora Wilson and Alice Farr, and café chantant to assist the funds of the French Red Cross, 13-15 July
- 1916 Victorian Artists' Society, at their galleries, Albert street, East Melbourne, opened 9 May
- 1916 Victorian Artists' Society, at their galleries, Albert street, East Melbourne, 25 September - 8 October
- 1917 Victorian Artists' Society Spring Exhibition, September
- 1918 Annual Exhibition of the Victorian Artists' Society, at their galleries, Albert street, East Melbourne, May/June
- 1919 Twenty Melbourne Painters, Atheneum Gallery 5-16 August
- 1919 Exhibition of Paintings, Athenaeum Hall, September (group exhibition, included a hospital interior by Hurry), 8 - 20 Sept.
- 1919 Twenty Melbourne Painters, Athenaeum Hall, 5-16 Aug.
- 1920 Autumn Exhibition of the Victorian Artists Society, Albert street galleries, East Melbourne, 25 May - 13 June
- 1920 Meldrum's students, Athenaeum Gallery, Collins Street, Melbourne, 1-12 June
- 1920 The second, exhibition of the Twenty Melbourne Painters, opened by Lieut-General Sir John Monash, Upper Athenaeum Hall, Collins Street, Melbourne, 4-14 August
- 1920 Autumn Exhibition, Victorian Artists' Society gallery at Albert Street East Melbourne, 25 May - 13 June
- 1920 Exhibition of Paintings, Athenaeum Hall, 1-12 June (Group Exhibition)
- 1921 Bendigo Art Society, Bendigo Art Gallery
- 1921 Autumn exhibition of the Victorian Artists' Society, opened by the Earl of Stradbroke, the Galleries, Albert Street, East Melbourne, 24 May - 12 June
- 1921 Third annual exhibition of the Twenty Melbourne Painters, Atheneum Hall, Collins Street, Melbourne, 3-13 August
- 1922 Victorian Artists' Society, VAS Galleries, Albert Street, East Melbourne, 23 May - 11 June
- 1922 Twenty Melbourne Painters, Athenaeum, Collins Street, Melbourne, 1-12 August
- 1923 Twenty Melbourne Painters, Athenaeum, Collins Street, Melbourne, 1-18 August
- 1923 Athenaeum Hall, February. Joint exhibition with J. Farmer
- 1925 Royal Society of Portrait Painters, London
- 1926 Exhibition of paintings by Mr J. Farmer and Mrs J. Farmer (P. Hurry), Athenaeum Hall, 27 April- 8 May
- 1927 Athenaeum Hall, December. Joint exhibition with J. Farmer
- 1927 Annual Spring Exhibition of the Victorian Artists' Society, VAS Galleries, Albert Street, East Melbourne, 24 October - 6 November
- 1927 Margaret MacLean's studio gallery, 450 Collins Street, Melbourne, October/November
- 1928 10th Annual Exhibition of the Twenty Melbourne Painters, Athenaeum, 18-29 September
- 1929 Women's Art Club, The Atheneaum, from 8 October
- 1931 Spring Exhibition, Victorian Artists' Society Galleries, Albert Street, East Melbourne, 28 September - 11 October
- 1932 Autumn Exhibition, Victorian Artists' Society gallery, Albert Street, East Melbourne, 23 April - 8 May
- 1932 Twenty Melbourne Painters, Athenaeum Gallery, 20 September - 1 October
- 1932 Spring Exhibition, Victorian Artists' Society gallery at Albert Street, East Melbourne, 26 September - 8 October
- 1932 Annual Exhibition of the Melbourne Society of Women Painters, Athenaeum, 5-19 October
- 1933 French Salon, Paris. Five portraits exhibited by J. Farmer and P. Hurry
- 1934 Exhibition of Paintings by C. Beckett, A. Figuerola, P. Hurry, M. Meldrum, J. Jorgensen and P. Leason, Athenaeum Gallery, 2-13 October
- 1934 25th Annual Exhibition of the Melbourne Society of Women Painters and Sculptors, Athenaeum Gallery, October.
- 1935 Melbourne Society of Women Painters, Athenaeum, 8-20 October
- 1935-38 Group Twelve, Melbourne, Annual Exhibitions
- 1937 P. Hurry, J. Farmer, John W Elischer (Exhibition), Athenaeum, 2-12 June
- 1937 The 28th annual exhibition of the Melbourne Society of Women Painters, opened by Lady Mann, Athenaeum Art Gallery, 5-16 October
- 1941 Exhibition of Paintings by Max Meldrum and the Meldrum Group; Farmer's Blaxland Galleries, Sydney
- 1943, from 1 December; Inclusion in a group show of ninety-one paintings and etchings with Arnold Shore, Max Meldrum, John Rowell, Jas. Quinn, John Farmer, Allan Jordan, Dora Serle, Margaret Pestell, Dora Wilson, Isabel Tweddle, Aileen Dent, Murray Griffin, Geo. Colville, and Victor Cog. Hawthorn Library.
- 1957 48th Annual Exhibition of the Melbourne Society of Women Painters and Sculptors, Athenaeum Gallery, October.
- 1959 Twenty Melbourne Painters exhibition, Athenaeum, September.

=== Posthumous ===
- 1973 Max Meldrum and his School, McClelland Gallery 6 May - 11 July
- 1983 Polly Hurry 1883-1963. A Retrospective. Castlemaine Art Gallery and Historical Museum 18 September - 23 October; travelling to McClelland Gallery 6-30 November

== Collections ==
- Victoria and Albert Museum, London
- Queensland Art Gallery
- Ballarat Art Gallery
- Castlemaine Art Museum
