= John Farmer (artist) =

Australian tonalist painter 1897–1989

Max Meldrum (1936) Portrait of John Farmer, oil on canvas 76.5 x 97.4 cm. Art Gallery of New South Wales

John McCormick Farmer (1 June 1897, Brunswick, Victoria–29 April 1989, Baxter, Victoria) was an Australian artist who painted the traditional genres of landscape, the portrait, the nude, and still life in the Australian tonalist style.

He travelled to China and Japan in 1921, and lived and worked throughout Europe from 1924 to 1935. During World War II he served in a camouflage unit. His mentor Max Meldrum painted his portrait held in the collection of the Art Gallery of New South Wales.

Farmer's work is represented in National Gallery of Victoria, Art Gallery of South Australia, Art Gallery of New South Wales, National Gallery of Australia, Queensland Art Gallery, Art Gallery of Western Australia, McClelland Gallery, Castlemaine Art Museum, Bendigo Art Gallery, Art Gallery of Ballarat and Geelong Gallery

== Early life and training ==
Born 1 June 1897 Farmer was brought up in the large family of ten, of Laura Lavinia (née Price) and Hiram Farmer, a watchman, in a small terrace house at 344 Victoria Street, Brunswick, Victoria, the site, near Brunswick station, occupied from 1922 by the Australian Liquorice Company. John Farmer studied from 1914 at the National Gallery of Victoria Art School in Melbourne, then privately with Max Meldrum, and later in Europe and the East.

== Australian tonalist artist ==
While studying at the National Gallery School Farmer worked as a scenery painter for J. C. Williamson Ltd. Richard McCullin, a drawing master at the Gallery School, suggested that students might be interested in going to hear a lecture in 1917 by controversial young painter, Max Meldrum, who argued that "the art of painting is a pure science - the science of optical analysis".

In Meldrum’s studio John Farmer and Polly Hurry met and were married on 13 August 1921. In a Victorian Artists’ Society exhibition in May 1921 Polly Hurry showed “a virile presentment of "John Farmer, Esq," in which the light is well given, and the character of the sitter strongly shown.” Farmer had become a close friend of fellow student 10 years his junior, Justus Jorgensen, when both attended the National Gallery School in 1914, where he also met Clarice Beckett and Colin Colahan.

The couple shared one of the purpose-built studios (Studio 2) at the 1888 Grosvenor Chambers, 9 Collins Street, Melbourne (its name a direct reference to Grosvenor Gallery of London) occupied also at various times by Meldrum, Tom Roberts, Frederick McCubbin, Arthur Streeton, Percival Ball, Charles Francis Summers, Clara Southern, Jane Sutherland, Charles Conder, E. Phillips Fox, John Longstaff, Girolamo Nerli, Louis Abrahams, Rose A. Walker, George Lambert, and Ola Cohn. Frequent visitors to the studio were Janet Cumbrae Stewart, Norah Gurdon, Dora L. Wilson (who also had a studio in the building), Jessie Traill, Norah Wilkie and Margaret Pestell.

== Asia ==
For their honeymoon the Farmers left via Hong Kong for China, visiting Shanghai and Peking, and Japan via Korea, to paint. An oft-repeated perception is that they were among the first few Australian artists to do so, though Ellis Rowan (1848-1922), Tenison Woods and Godfrey Miller preceded them, and Asian art was being collected in Australian museums from 1904.

Not long after their return to Australia in 1921, they moved to 17-19 Williams Road Olinda, quite close to Jorgensen’s brother, Elef, who was the doctor in Belgrave, and were close neighbours of Arthur Streeton's property Longacres. Justus Jorgenson designed the Farmers' house, to which they gave a Japanese name Miyako, after a hotel in which they had stayed in Tokyo. It included a very large open room, not dissimilar to Elef Jorgensen’s’ Big Room'. The house served as an artists' retreat for many of the Meldrum students. Clarice Beckett was staying when Hurry and Farmer conducted a formal Japanese tea ceremony and also practised the ancient art of ikebana, inspiring Beckett’s painting of a vase of gladioli, a rare and large example of Beckett working in the still life genre.

== European residencies and exhibiting in Australia ==
In late 1923, inviting Meldrum and his family to stay in their house, the Farmers set out for Europe, arriving first of all in Paris, where they were reunited with the Jorgensons and the Colquhouns. They divided their time in Europe between France; first in a studio in Montparnasse to prepare works accepted into the Salon d'Automne and the winter salon; and in lodgings in the coach house at 14a Grove End Rd. in St John's Wood near Regent's Park in London. They made a pilgrimage to Millet’s studio at Fontaineblau, following his footsteps in the forest and painting around Barbizon, and travelled south to the French Riviera and painted at the coastal city of Nice. Time was also spent in Holland to see other Rembrandt works which John Farmer copied.

The couple embarked at Plymouth on the Demosthenes for Australia on 10 October 1925. Hurry exhibited jointly with Farmer, whose taste for Old Masters was reinforced by his encounters with Modernism in Europe, and the couple in September 1927 showed at Margaret MacLean's studio gallery, 450 Collins Street, and again there in October with Elsie Barlow, Jessie Traill, Nora Gurdon, Rose A. Walker, Hilda Travers; artists identified by a reviewer as all "well-known".

From Olinda, the couple returned to Europe over 1932–1935, spending time in Paris, where John made a copy of a Rembrandt portrait in the Louvre, and in London.

== Reception ==
The Australian reviewer of the Farmers' joint 1926 exhibition at the Athenaeum, likely Harold Herbert, considered Farmer's "best works" for "simplicity of effect" true tone values, and "harmonious...colour schemes", to be his flower and still life studies, finding them "excellent, both with regard to the truth of light and shade, and by reason of their rich colour quality. There is a study of "Roses" that is masterly in treatment. The light floats through the painting as in nature, and momentarily the illusion of real flowers is given." Among Farmer's portraits the reviewer found a study of a man in a red cloak (now held in the Castlemaine Art Museum) the best, but "spoilt by he plane of the forehead being out of tone and suggesting a deformity. It is otherwise well painted, and a good effect of light is achieved." Noted also was Farmer's copy of The Painter's Brother (at the time attributed by the Louvre to Rembrandt). Of his contribution to the Victorian Artists' Society Spring exhibition of 1926 Alexander Colquhoun notes that "Farmer hangs, among other good things, an admirably painted head of a young man, No. 105, and a virile little still life entitled Oranges," works that The Australiasian praised as "remarkable achievements."

Critic Basil Burdett remarked more than once in the 1930s on Farmer's faithfulness to Meldrum's Australian tonalism, "untouched by the heresies of modern art", though noting a more marked emphasis on colour "compared with the more sombre tones of many of his confreres," so that:

strangely enough — and those who are very familiar with the Meldrum theories will appreciate the ironic paradox — Mr Farmer's pictures often have the effect of abstractions in which the only interest is the color. Only the absence of a considered pattern makes them fail as decorations.

Paintings in Farmer's 1936 solo show were priced at 12–120 guineas, while in a show with Hurry in 1937 hers ranged from 10–100 and his were 8–25.

== Later life ==
In 1944 Farmer was a patron, with William Dargie and William Ricketts, in the 'Save the Dandenongs' movement. In 1945 the Farmers rented Mikayo to John Thorley and his family, and moved into a smaller dwelling on the property. Having until 1959 the studio at Grosvenor Chambers in Collins Street, they were often away from the Dandenongs, so in the mid-1950s they relocated to 98 Gould St., Frankston to be near the sea. After 42 years of their marriage, Polly died there on 5 August 1963 at the age of 80. John Farmer died on 29 Apr 1989 at nearby Baxter, Victoria, and was cremated on 4 May 1989 at Fawkner Cemetery.

== Memberships ==
- The Twenty Melbourne Painters Society
- Fellowship of Australian Artists
- Society of French Artists

== Selected exhibitions ==
=== Posthumous solo ===
- 2011, 21 August 2011 – 30 October: John Farmer: landscapes and vignettes. Prints from the McClelland Collection. McClelland Gallery + Sculpture Park, 390 McClelland Drive, Langwarrin
- 1982: John Farmer: intaglio prints, 1940-1960. McClelland Gallery + Sculpture Park

=== Posthumous group ===
- 1997, from 12 October: Australian artists influenced by Rembrandt. Castlemaine Art Gallery and Historical Museum, Lyttleton St., Castlemaine

=== Solo ===
- 1934, 26 June–27 July: Paintings. Meldrum Gallery 127 Queen street, Melbourne
- 1936, 4–14 November: solo show of painting. Fine Art Society, Melbourne

=== Group and joint ===
- 1984, 28 October–11 November: 66th annual exhibition of The Twenty Melbourne Painters Society with members Sir William Dargie; John Farmer; Gordon Speary; Alan Martin; Shirley Bourne; Ramon Horsfield; Judith Wills; Max Casey; Arthur Markham; Dorothy Whitehead Griffiths; Peter Glass; Ron Crawford; Graham Moore; Elizabeth Colquhoun; Douglas Miller; Audrey Snell; June Hobart; David Taylor. Victorian Artists Society, East Melbourne
- 1981, 18 October–1 November: 63rd annual exhibition of The Twenty Melbourne Painters Society. Victorian Artists Society Galleries, 430 Albert St. East Melbourne
- 1961, 9–21 October: Fellowship of Australian Artists Annual exhibition. Athenaeum Art Gallery. Artists exhibiting were John Allcot, Len Annois, Howard Ashton, Richard Ashton, Will Ashton, Alan D. Baker, A.M.E. Bale, Rex Battarbee, Evelyn Baxter, George Benson, Allan Bernaldo, Rechid Bey, Shirley Bourne, Arthur Boyd, Rex Bramleigh, Ernest Buckmaster, Norma Bull, Charles Bush, Donald Campbell, Amalie Colquhoun, Archie Colquhoun, Elizabeth Colquhoun, Noel Counihan, Sybil Craig, Charles Crampton, Ron Crawford, George Crossley, William Dargie, Aileen Dent, Douglas Dundas, Margaret Dunn, Mary Edwards, Cathleen Edkins, John Eldershaw, John Farmer, Alma Figuerola, William Frater, John Gardner, Esmond George, James Gleeson, Harold Greenhill, Ambrose Griffin, Harley Griffiths, Harry Hanke, Leon Hansen, Melville Haysom, Sali Herman, Hans Heysen, Nora Heysen, Dermont Hillier, Edith Holmes, Polly Hurry, Graeme Inson, Kenneth Jack, Geoff Jones, Robert Juniper, Louis Kahan, Roger Kemp, Michael Kmit, Charles Lancaster, David Lawrance, Daryl Lindsay, C. Salis Lloyd
- 1950, 23 May–2 June 1950: Tenth anniversary 1940–1950 exhibition. Tye's Art Gallery 100 Bourke Street, Melbourne
- 1950, from 1 July: Flower paintings by well-known Victorian artists. Stanley Coe Gallery, 435 Bourke St., Melbourne
- 1939, 5 April-3 May: Second annual exhibition of the Australian Academy of Art. National Gallery of Victoria in Swanston Street, Melbourne.
- 1937, 2–12 June: P. Hurry, John Farmer, John W. Elischer (sculptor). Athenaeum, Melbourne
- 1937, from 6 September: Polly Hurry and John Farmer. Margaret MacLean gallery, 450 Collins Street, Melbourne
- 1927, from 29 October: Victorian Artists' Society's Spring Exhibition
- 1927, April: Victorian Artists' Society's Autumn Exhibition
- 1926, from 15 October: Victorian Artists' Society Spring Exhibition
- 1926, 27 April–8 May: Exhibition of paintings by Mr. John Farmer and Mrs. J. Farmer (P. Hurry). Athenaeum Hall, 188 Collins Street, Melbourne

== Collections ==
- National Gallery of Victoria
- Art Gallery of South Australia
- Art Gallery of New South Wales
- National Gallery of Australia
- Queensland Art Gallery
- Art Gallery of Western Australia
- McClelland Gallery
- Castlemaine Art Museum
- Bendigo Art Gallery
- Art Gallery of Ballarat
- Geelong Gallery
