= Rose Walker =

Rose Walker may refer to:

- Rose A. Walker (1879–1942), an Australian painter and miniaturist.
- Rose Walker (Neighbours), a character from Australian soap Opera Neighbours.
- Rose Walker (Sandman), a character from the Sandman comic series.
