= Percy Leason =

Australian artist (1889–1959)

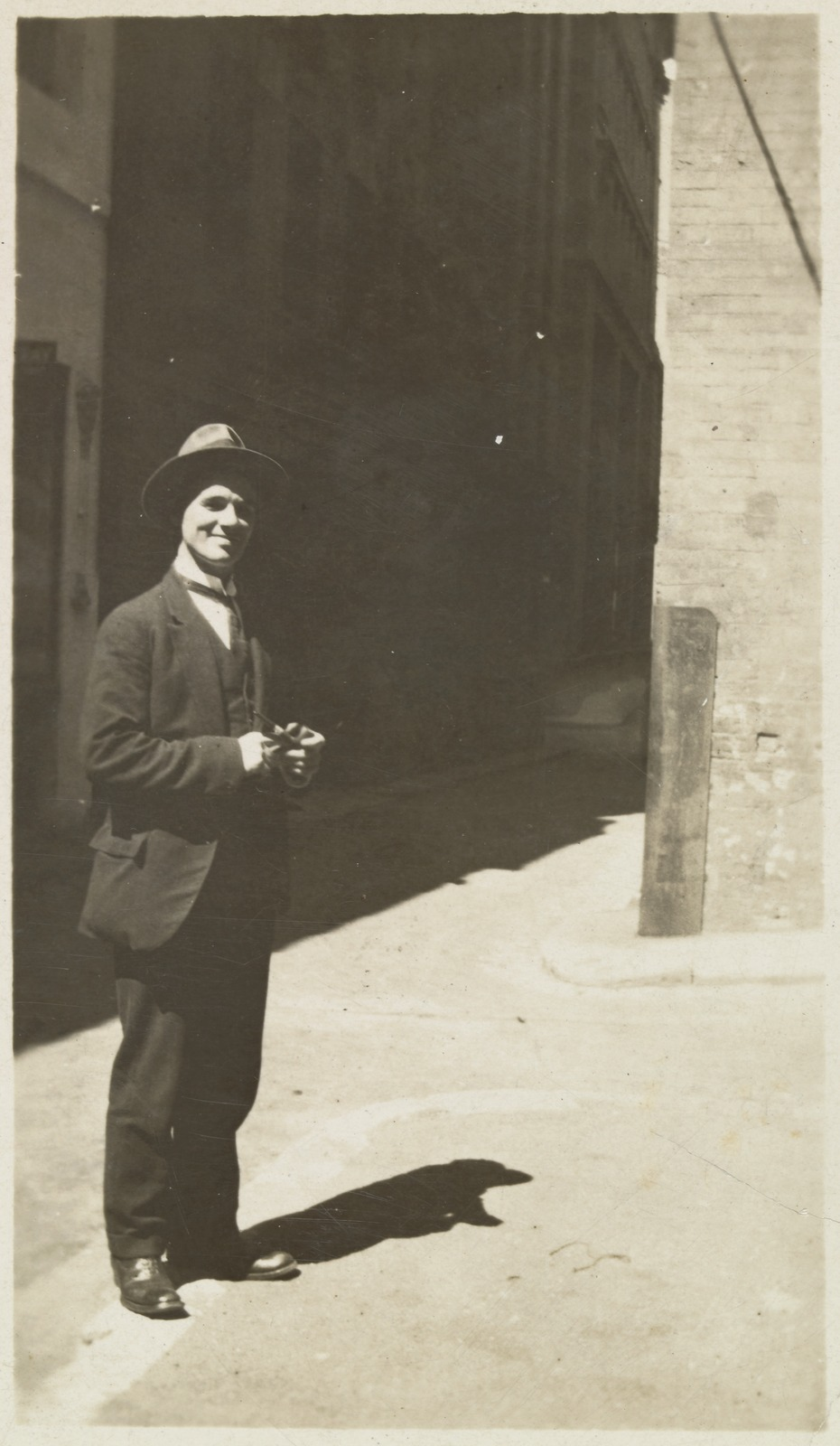
- Percy Leason in a laneway (c. 1910 – c. 1915). Collection State Library Victoria
- Born: 23 February 1889; Lillimur, Victoria, Australia
- Died: 11 September 1959 (aged 70); Staten Island, New York City
- Education: National Gallery of Victoria Art School
- Known for: Painting, Illustration, Cartooning
- Notable work: Wiregrass cartoon series
- Movement: Victorian Artists Society; Australian Tonalism
- Spouse: Isabel

Percy Alexander Leason (23 February 1889 – 11 September 1959) was an Australian art critic, political cartoonist and artist who was a major figure in the Australian tonalist movement. As a painter and commercial artist his works span two continents.

== Early life and training ==
Percy Leason was born in the remote wheat farm district in the town of Lillimur just outside Kaniva, Victoria, Australia in 1889. His father was a wheat farmer and his uncle James was proprietor of a saddle shop in Kaniva. His parents had expected he would carry on the family tradition of wheat farming or saddlery making. In his adolescent years he demonstrated an early interest in drawing. His earliest works of 1900 were landscapes, still life studies, and portraits of himself and his mother and father.

In 1906 he was apprenticed as a lithographer at Sands and McDougall Lithographers, in Melbourne. He soon transferred to the art department where he did illustrations for jam tin labels and department store advertisements. His first major illustration was a poster for Carlton Brewery in Melbourne of Sam Griffis, from an Edgar Newlands photograph of an itinerant miner, standing at a bar with a full pint. The caption of the poster "I allus has wan at Eleven", became a famous trademark for Foster's Lager.

During these years he studied at the National Gallery of Victoria Art School under the tutelage of Bernard Hall and Frederick McCubbin. Upon completing his apprenticeship he began a somewhat bohemian lifestyle and developed camaraderie with the Melbourne artists such as William Frater, Hal Guye, Frank R. Crozier and others and associated himself with the Victorian Artists Society. Paintings of this period included life figures for the Shakespeare tercentenary and portraits of fellow artists Richard McCann and Harry McClellan.

== Career ==
=== Australia ===
Leason's introduction to book illustration began in 1914 with illustrations for James.C. Hamilton, Pioneering Days in Western Victoria, followed by Here is Faery by Frank Wilmont in 1915. In 1916 he illustrated a booklet for the tercentenary celebrating William Shakespeare. The same year he painted a panoramic scene of the Australian & New Zealand Forces at Gallipoli, now in the War Memorial Museum in Canberra. In 1916 he painted a series of canvases of the Sturt expedition into the interior of Australia. The largest of these, Out of Food and Water, depicting the desperate situation of the expedition, is in the National Library of Australia in Canberra. In 1918 he illustrated for a book of poems by Henry Lawson, notable Australian poet. With additional book illustration his reputation as an illustrator secured him a position as chief designer with the commercial publishing firm of Sydney Ure Smith publishers and he moved to Sydney. Here he worked as a commercial artist and illustrated commercial advertisements, and also illustrated for Home magazine. He served on the staff of the Sydney Bulletin as political cartoonist, replacing David Low.

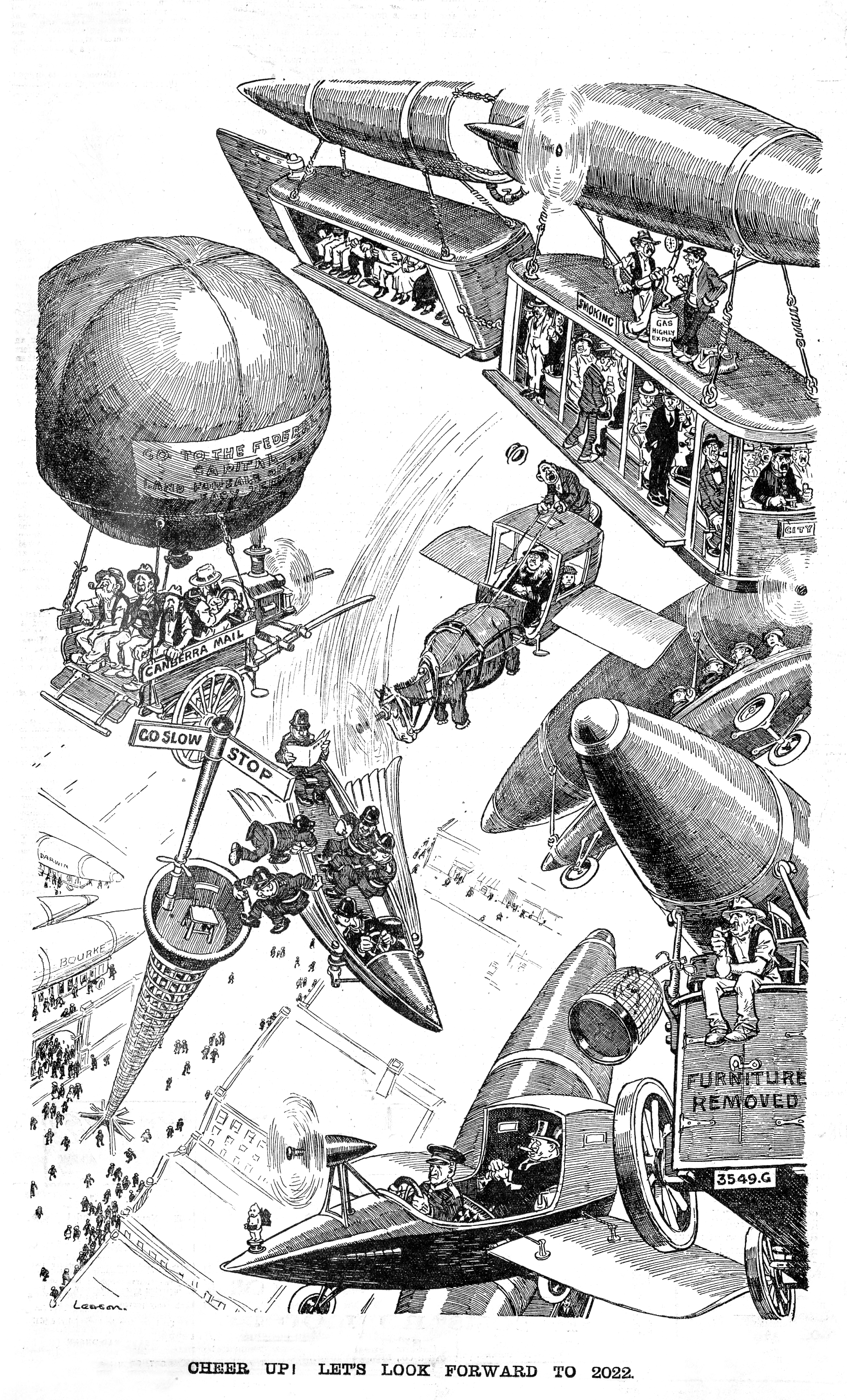
Percy Leason, "Cheer Up! Let's Look Forward to 2022" The Bulletin 4 May 1922

He became interested in etchings and joined the Sydney Society of Artists and the Painters and Etchers Society and associated himself with Sydney's contemporary artists. In 1918 his paintings and etchings were purchased by The Art Gallery of New South Wales, Sydney. Julian Ashton praised Leason's work in the magazine Art in Australia, in an article on what he considered a good picture:

I have suggested nearly all his exhibits were notable, that being one where composition. value, form and color were most apparent particularly in Mother and Child. The subject is as old as humanity, but Mr. Leason has been able to invest it with fresh interest. As in numerous works of the old masters, he has suggested the brooding mother but the turbulent young rascal in his mother's lap strikes a note of reality which is frequently absent in depiction of the Holy child. The composition and drawing in this modern Mother and Child are charming, the tonality well observed and the color rich and luminous. Such a picture does not make an instantaneous appeal; it grows upon you with steady but ever increasing charm."

His paintings up to this point showed the influence of the darker tonality of the National Gallery School. In 1923 he was also represented in an exhibition of Australian artists at the Royal Academy of Arts in London. This same year he was recruited by Keith Murdoch of the Melbourne Herald as chief staff artist. He returned to Melbourne and it was here that he developed the famous Wiregrass cartoon series. His illustrations also appeared in Melbourne Punch and Table Talk magazines. At that time he was the highest-paid commercial artist in Australia. Returning to Melbourne he settled in the town of Eltham and built a home and one of the first art studios in Eltham entirely devoted to painting. Teaching class and entertaining the society of Melbourne as well as his artist cronies, the town developed into an artist colony. Among its residents who later became notable was Justus Jorgensen of Montsalvat.

In 1916 he had met Max Meldrum who had returned from France and expressed his ideas of tonal analysis. When Leason moved back to Melbourne from Sydney in 1924, the two men bonded their ideas and cemented the style of tonalism they both would follow for the rest of their lives. Leason's articles in the press against contemporary art in support of Meldrum's theory helped the cause. Participation in shows with Victorian Artists Society in Melbourne further advanced his career as a painter.

In 1928, Leason contended some figures described by the ethnologist John Mathew in 1897 were merely natural stains in the rock, which caused some controversy.

In 1934 at the suggestion of Donald Thomson and Professor Wood Jones he was commissioned by Melbourne University to paint a series of portraits of Australian Aborigines. These were presented in an exhibition at the Athenaeum Gallery, and were his first one-man major exhibition. These portraits demonstrated his understanding and control of the tonal technique. A great critical row developed and the portraits were questioned as to whether they were art or ethnographic studies. Critic Blamire Young effectively squashed the artist and the portraits. In his article he asked visitors "to decide whether the portraits could be classed as an exhibition of works of art or' as an ante-mortem analysis of a moribund race, painted more or less in expiation of our sins in something of the same spirit that in the past stirred ill-doers to undertake the laborious washing of pilgrim's feet." The exchanges continued for a considerable time but eventually the paintings were included in the State Library of Victoria, Melbourne.

An inquisitive and active mind led to his questioning of the origins of an artist's depiction of the visual image. He developed a keen interest in prehistoric cave art and advanced the theory that these artists made their drawings from sketches of dead beasts. This theory was published in the Journal of the Prehistoric Society of Great Britain England in 1939. Towards the end of the 1930s Leason became concerned with the dwindling prospects of continued employment as a commercial artist, the rivalry in the Melbourne art scene between modern art and members of the Meldrum group, and the impending World War.

=== United States ===
Faced with the responsibility of a family of six children, he decided that his chances for continued success were better in the United States. He emigrated in 1938 and began his career in New York doing commercial illustration with pen and ink illustration of murder mysteries and detective stories, for the New York Daily News, and Blue Book Magazine. His first major book illustration in 1938 was The Wizard of Oz by L. Frank Baum. He joined the illustrating complement of the Gilbert Thompkins studios in New York which led to illustrations in Collier's, Liberty, and Saturday Evening Post magazines. He consequently became a member of the Society of Illustrators of New York.

In 1939 his family emigrated from Australia and settled on Staten Island, New York. Recognizing the opportunity to spread the word about tonal painting, he established his first painting school in New York City in 1941, and continued it on Staten Island until 1957. In 1942 he held his first exhibition at the Staten Island Institute of Arts and Sciences. In 1943 he became the chairman and president of the art section. He developed an interest in art on Staten Island with the first of the outdoor art shows that continue to be a borough wide event. He also arranged the first annual Artist Carnival and increased the interest in the art section with annual exhibitions.

In the summer months of 1948 he taught painting and landscape at the Wayman Adams School in Elizabethtown, New York in the Adirondack Mountains and at his own school in Westport NY in 1949. He also served on the staff of the Westport, Connecticut School of Commercial Art under the direction of Albert Dorne. In 1944 M. Grumbacher published a time chart he had developed outlining the historical development of tonal analysis as it applied to artists from 1200 to the present. Titled "The Rise and Decline of Painting", it traced the development of artists representation of the visual image and placed modernism at the bottom the chart. It was distributed through the Scholastic awards program and caused some concern among educational circles as well as kudos from supporters. At this time, the New York art world was going through great changes with interest in Modernism and Expressionism. He vehemently opposed these ideas and contributed openly to the critics in New York newspapers and the Staten Island Advance. The only associations that were holdouts for realistic painting during this period were the Salmagundi Club, Allied Artists, and the American Artist Professional League. Leason became aligned with their members who felt the same way about the changing trends. He held lively painting demonstrations and lectures on realistic tonalism in defiance against the prevailing theories on art. During these years he painted many landscapes and studios studies, most of which are in the collection of the Castlemaine Art Museum in Australia.

Associated with Portraits Incorporated, N.Y. he had the opportunity to paint some portraits of notoriety including Arlene Francis, TV personality, and Congressman Dewey Short from Missouri and chairman of the House Armed Services Committee, which is in the collection of the House of Representatives, Washington, D.C. A large portrait of Michael Engel, publicity director for M. Grumbacker art supplies won the Hollander prize in 1945 at the exhibition of Audubon Artists. In 1957 he traveled with his wife Isabel to France and England. He painted several tonal studies of Paris and the countryside of the Dordogne region which he visited in particular to justify his theory of cave art.

Percy Leason's last one-man exhibition was held at the Chase Galleries, New York, where many of these European studies were on exhibit. In view of what was happening in the art world at this time, the exhibition received poor reviews. Arts Magazine stated that his paintings appeared to be nothing more than "numbered picture scenes". He tried to sue the magazine but his failing health and lack of funds prevented this.

== Death ==
In 1959 he died on Staten Island, New York City, practically penniless and very despondent at not having received adequate recognition for his labours. He was survived by his wife and six children.

== Legacy ==
Two retrospective exhibitions were held at the Staten Island Institute and at the Salmagundi Club, New York. In tribute to his artistic genius, Staten Island Institute curator James Cogin, quoted in the exhibition catalog from Frank Moore Coolby: "Every man ought to be inquisitive every hour of his great adventure down to the day when he shall no longer cast a shadow in the sun. For if he dies without a question in his heart what excuse is there for his continuance?"

Percy Leason's constant questioning of tonal technique as an ideal and his works he left are his legacy and his continuance.
