= Henrietta Maria Gulliver =

Australian artist (1866–1945)

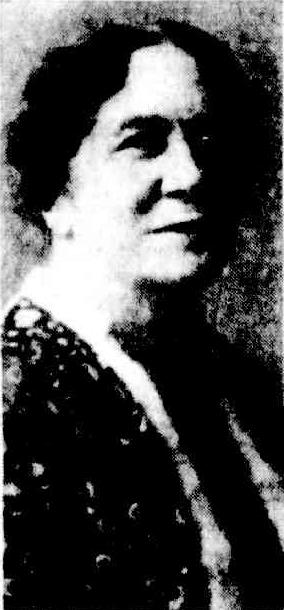
- Born: Henrietta Maria Shanklin; 29 October 1866
- Died: 15 July 1945 (aged 78)
- Known for: Painting, Floristry
- Spouse: George Ekins Gulliver

Henrietta Maria Gulliver (29 October 1866 – 15 July 1945) was an Australian artist who specialized in landscape and floral still-life paintings. She was also a florist, horticulturalist and landscape designer.

== Life and family ==
Henrietta grew up in Sale, in Eastern Victoria. She was the fifth of eight children born to pharmacist Robert Shanklin and Maria Barbara née Ronalds, who was a professional fly tier and daughter of renowned fly fisherman Alfred Ronalds. Henrietta married George Ekins Gulliver in 1900 and had two daughters. Gulliver was a successful and wealthy pharmacist who developed and manufactured the famous Australian drug "Laxettes". They spent the majority of their married life in the Melbourne area although they also lived for several years in Capel, Surrey in England. Sam Griffiths is one of their great-grandsons.

== Gardener and florist ==
Henrietta had moved to Melbourne around 1885 to work for her uncle Nathaniel Ronalds, who was a leading nurseryman and florist. She then opened her own florist business in the city centre which quickly gained a strong reputation. After her marriage she was able to design and create substantial garden estates in Cheltenham and Sassafras, both of which were widely admired.

== Painter ==
Henrietta studied at the National Gallery of Victoria Art School in the period 1892–99. Tom Roberts encouraged her interest in painting, and she also interacted with the landscape painter Arthur Streeton, who influenced her style and remained a lifelong friend. She was invited to exhibit at Frederick McCubbin’s studio in 1905. She was a founding member of the Melbourne Society of Women Painters and Sculptors and served in two different periods as president. She was an original member of the Twenty Melbourne Painters Society in 1918, and was also active in the Victorian Artists Society, including on its council. Henrietta mounted a solo exhibition in 1925.

Her gardens and their flowers were the inspiration for many of her paintings. Other artists who also sketched and painted at her properties included Clara Southern, Hilda Rix Nicholas, Elsie Barlow and Alice Marian Ellen Bale.

== Selected works ==
Oil paintings by Henrietta Maria Gulliver

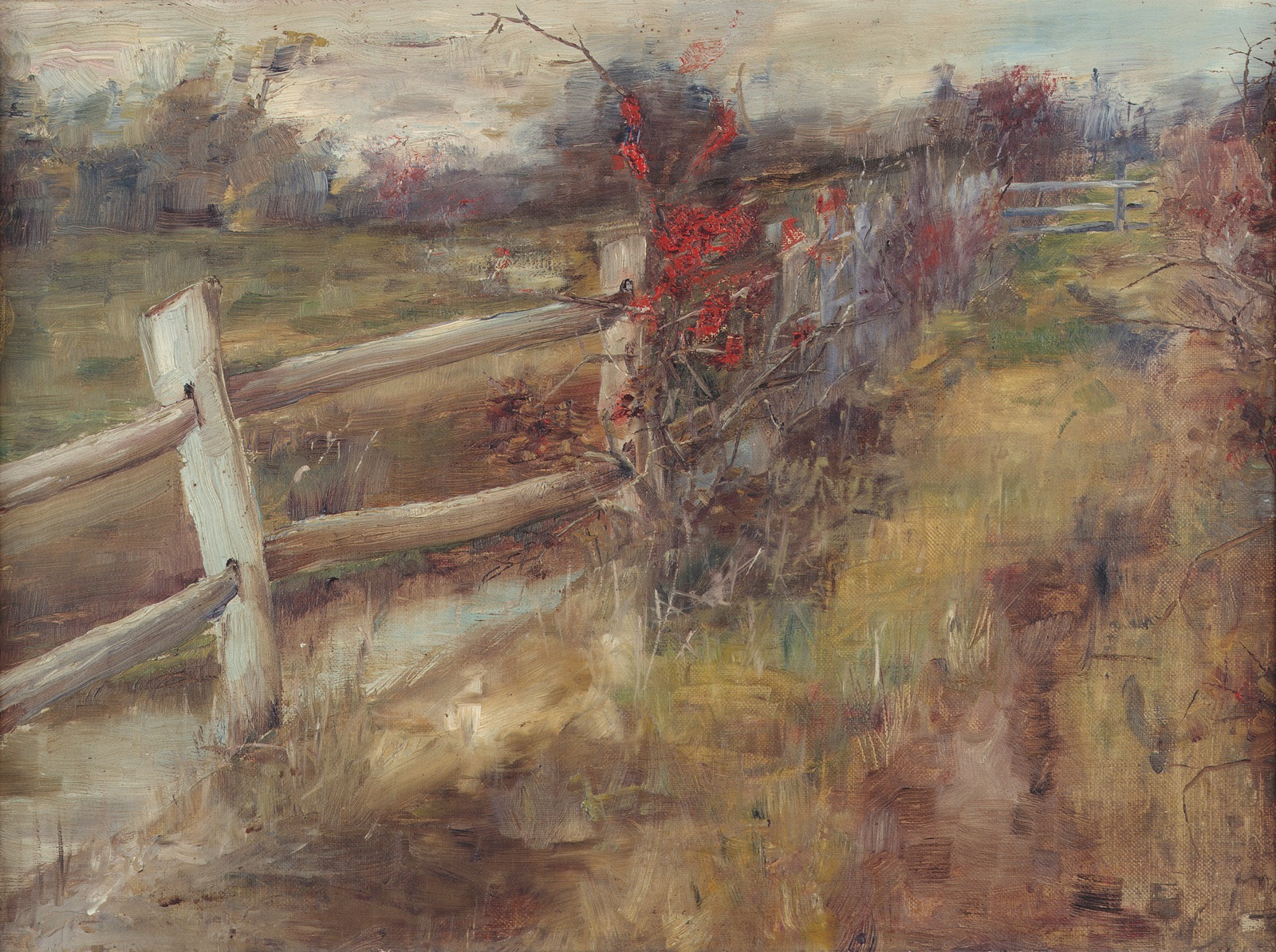
The Hawthorn Path, State Library Victoria

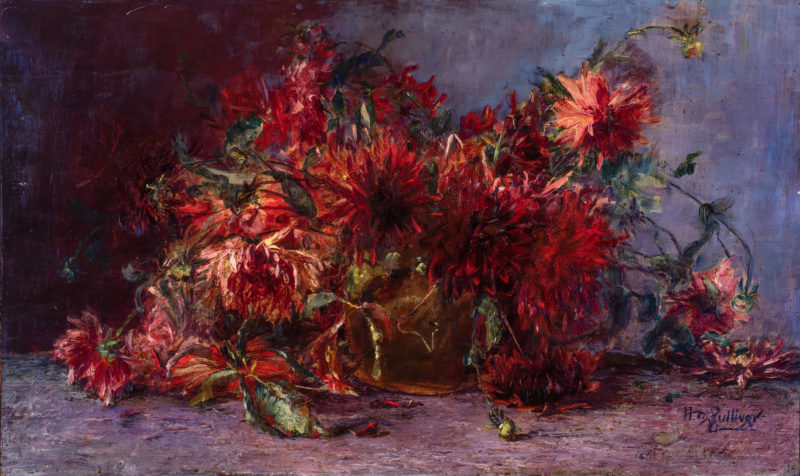
Dahlias, Castlemaine Art Museum

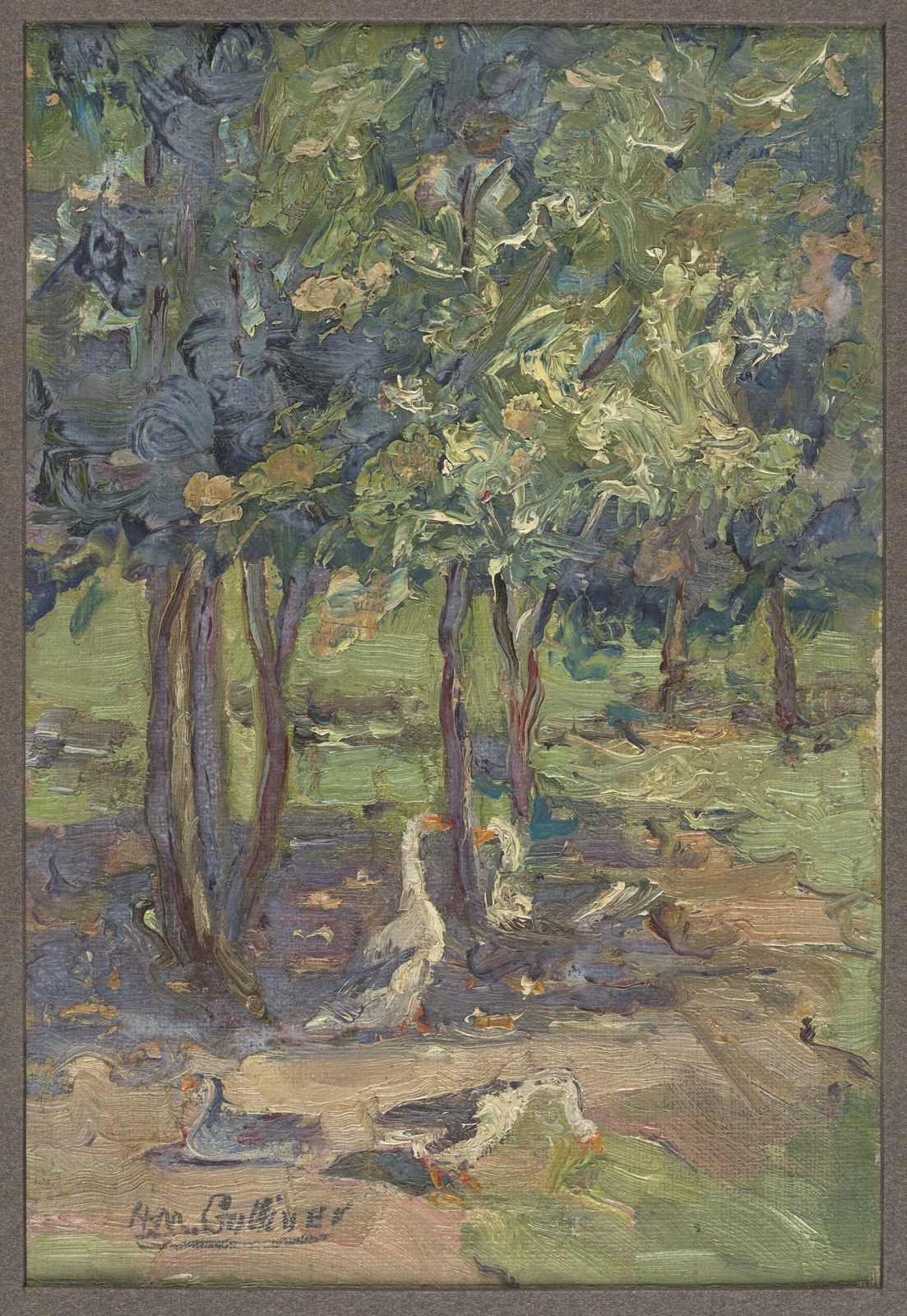
Ducks, State Library Victoria

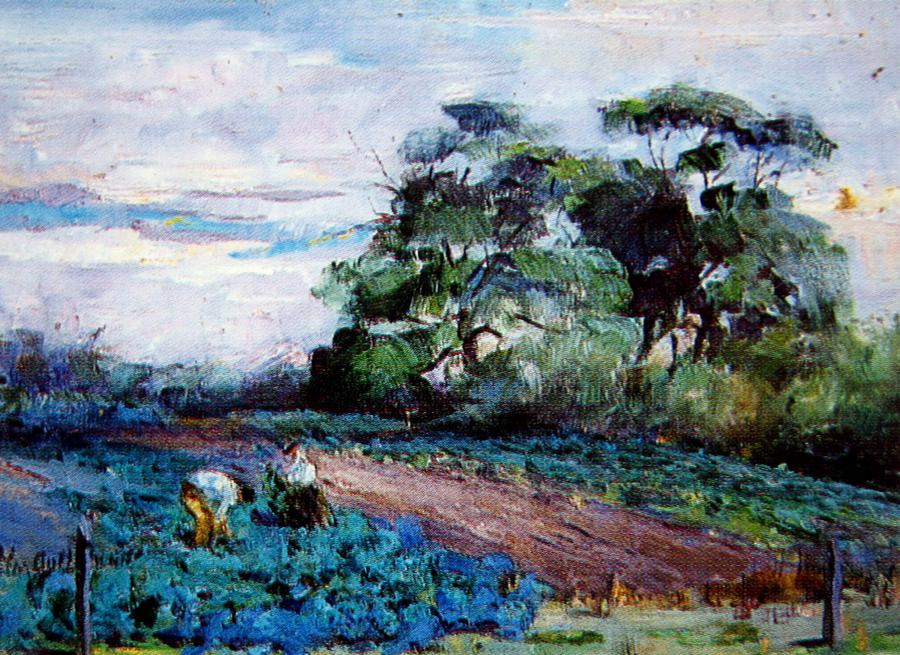
The Cabbage Patch, Private collection

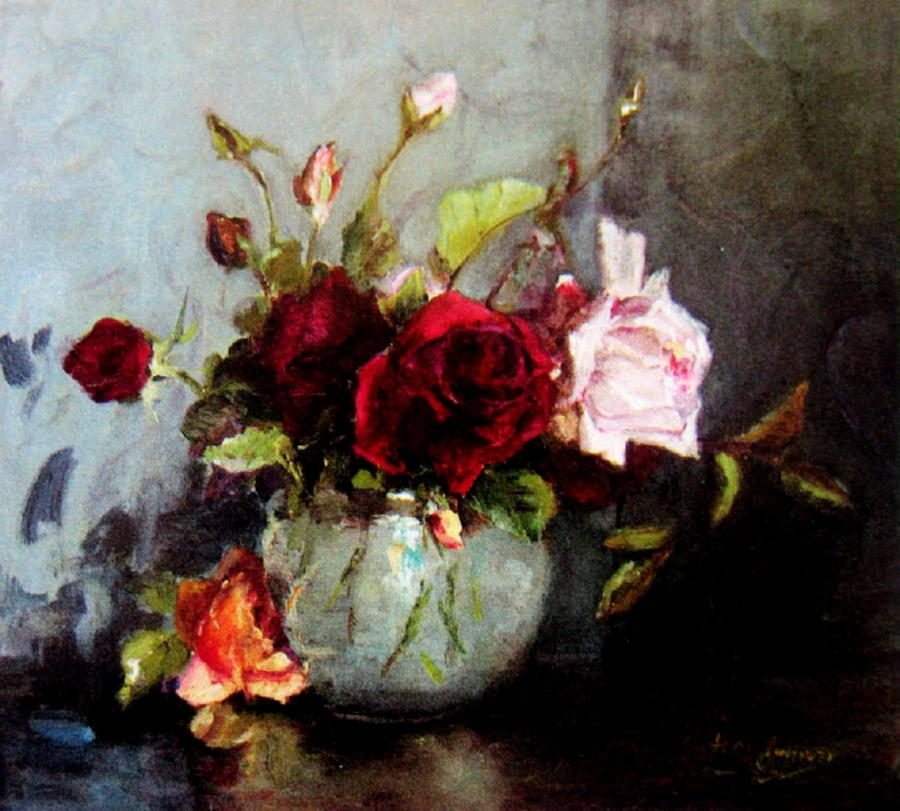
Still life with roses, Private collection

== Exhibitions ==
- Victorian Artists' Society Spring exhibition, Galleries East Melbourne (1917)
- Melbourne Society of Women Painters and Sculptors annual exhibition, Queen Victoria Markets (1919)
- Twenty Melbourne Painters, Athenaeum Gallery (15 - 29 September 1925)
- Decoration Gallery, 289 Collins Street (November 24 - December 5, 1925)
- Melbourne Society of Women Painters and Sculptors 28th annual exhibition, Athenaeum Gallery (1937)
- Flower studies, Stair Gallery, 131 Collins Street (November 29 - December 11, 1937)
- Melbourne Society of Women Painters and Sculptors 29th annual exhibition, Athenaeum Gallery (1938)
- Melbourne Society of Women Painters and Sculptors annual exhibition, Athenaeum Gallery (1941)
- Victorian Artists' Society Spring exhibition (September 29 - October 11, 1942)
- Melbourne Society of Women Painters and Sculptors 36th annual exhibition, Athenaeum Gallery (9 - 20 October 1945)

== Collections ==
- Castlemaine Art Museum
