= Twenty Melbourne Painters Society Inc =

Australian arts organization

- Formation: 1918
- Headquarters: Melbourne, Australia
- Website: twentymelbournepainterssociety.com.au

Twenty Melbourne Painters Society is an Australian arts organisation that was established in 1918. The group split from the Victorian Artists Society to follow the Australian Tonalist Max Meldrum. Membership is restricted to 20 and is upon invitation only. The society follows the traditions of realist, tonal and impressionist painting and holds an annual exhibition.

== History ==
The Twenty Melbourne Painters Society (TMPS) was established in 1918. The group was a break-away group from the Victorian Artists Society, leaving to follow Australian Tonalist Max Meldrum.

In 1919, within the first year of formation, the Twenty Melbourne Painters held their first exhibition.

The group is limited to 20 members and is by invitation.

The Twenty Melbourne Painters has held an annual exhibition since 1919.

== Founding TMPS members ==
- Jas Stuart Anderson
- Alice Marian Ellen Bale
- Elsie Barlow
- Alexander Colquhoun
- George Colville
- Edith Downing
- Bernice E. Edwell
- William ‘Jock’ Frater
- Henrietta Maria Gulliver
- Carl Hampel
- Polly Hurry
- Miss C.E. James
- Richard McCann
- Bertha Merfield
- Albert Ernest Newbury
- Clara Southern
- Ruth Sutherland
- Jo Sweatman
- Isabel May Tweddle
- Rose A. Walker

== Picture collection ==
Twenty Melbourne Painters, Pictures Collection, State Library Victoria

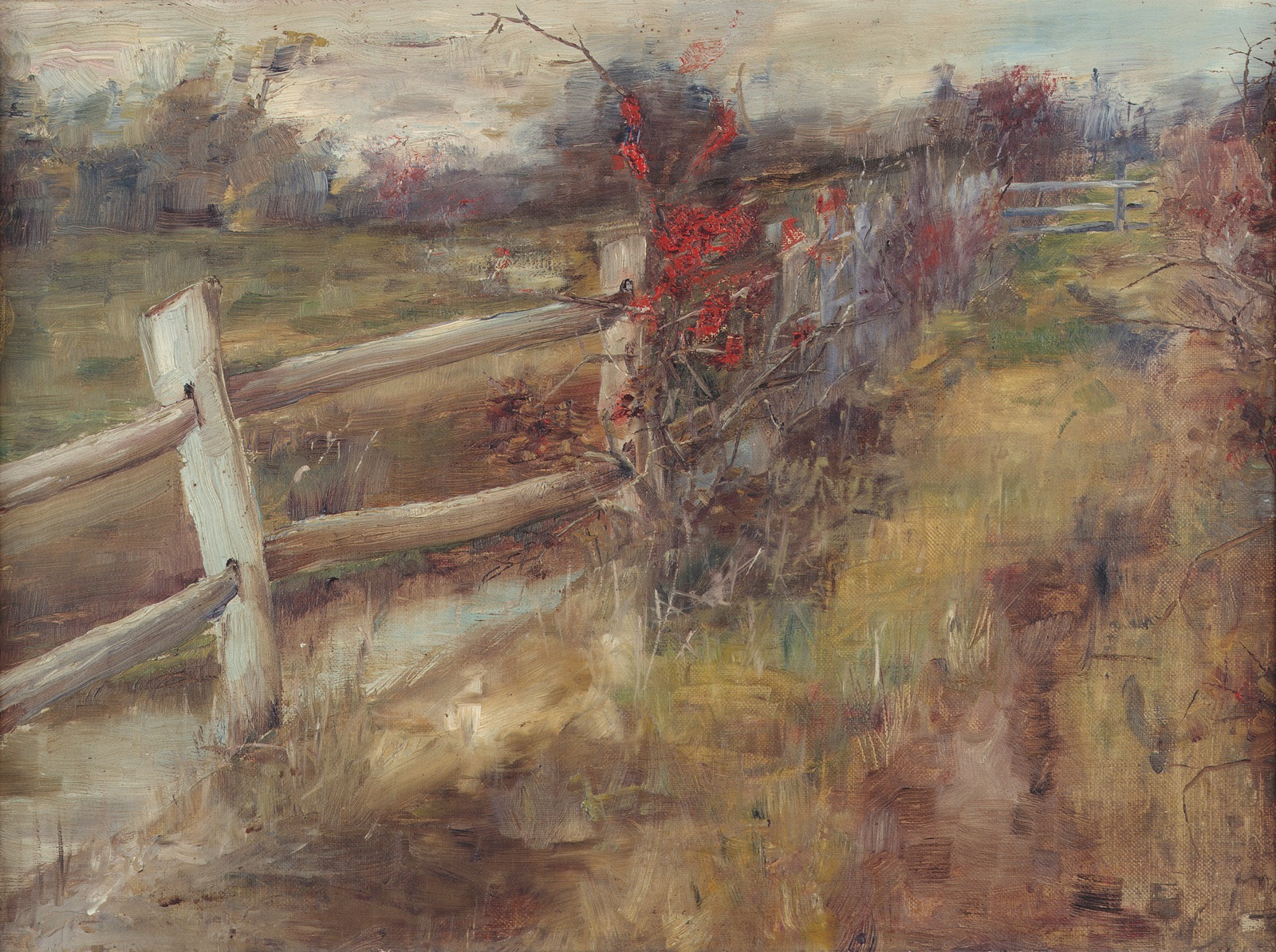
The Hawthorn Path, Henrietta Maria Gulliver

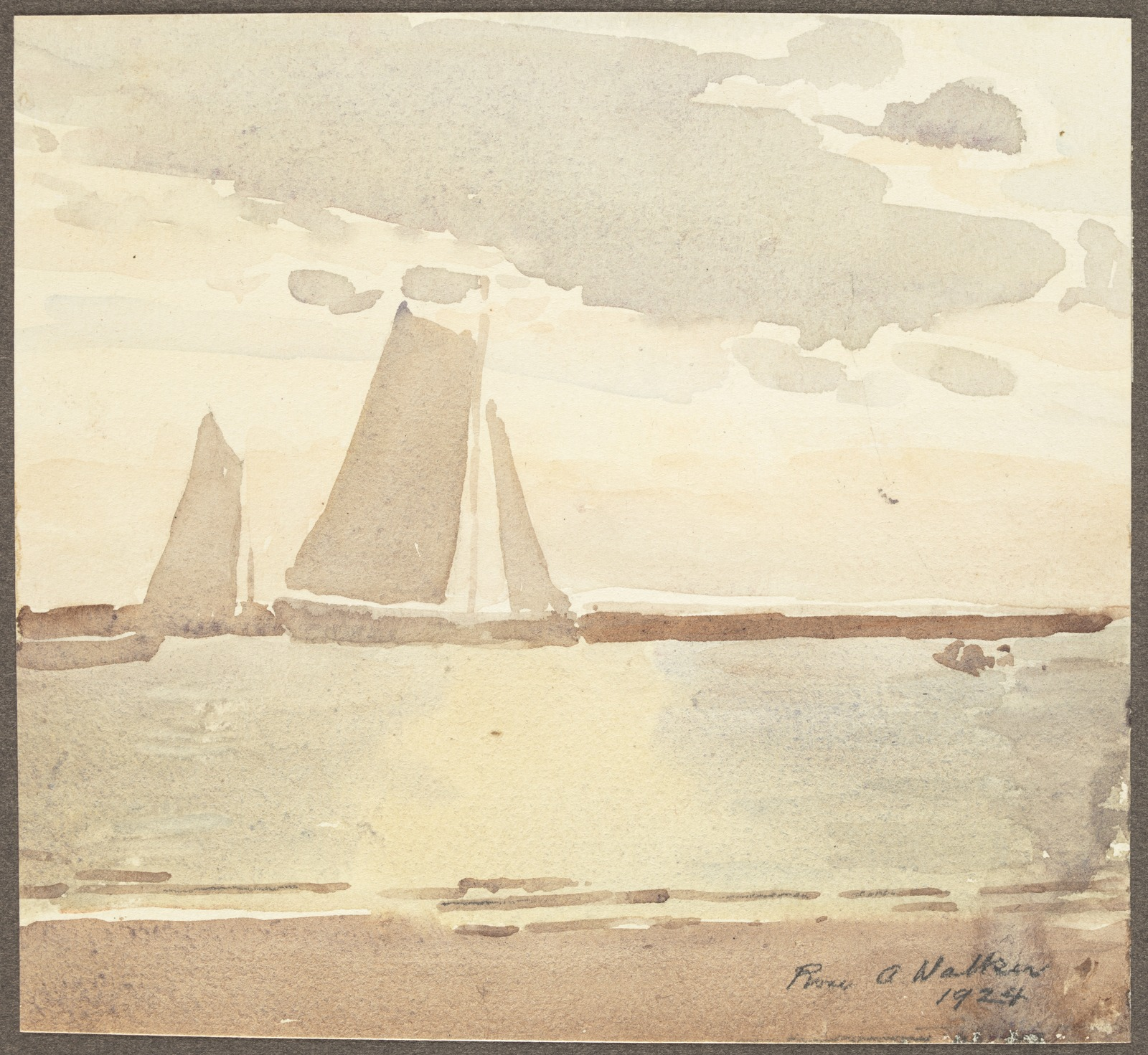
Yachts on bay, Rose A. Walker

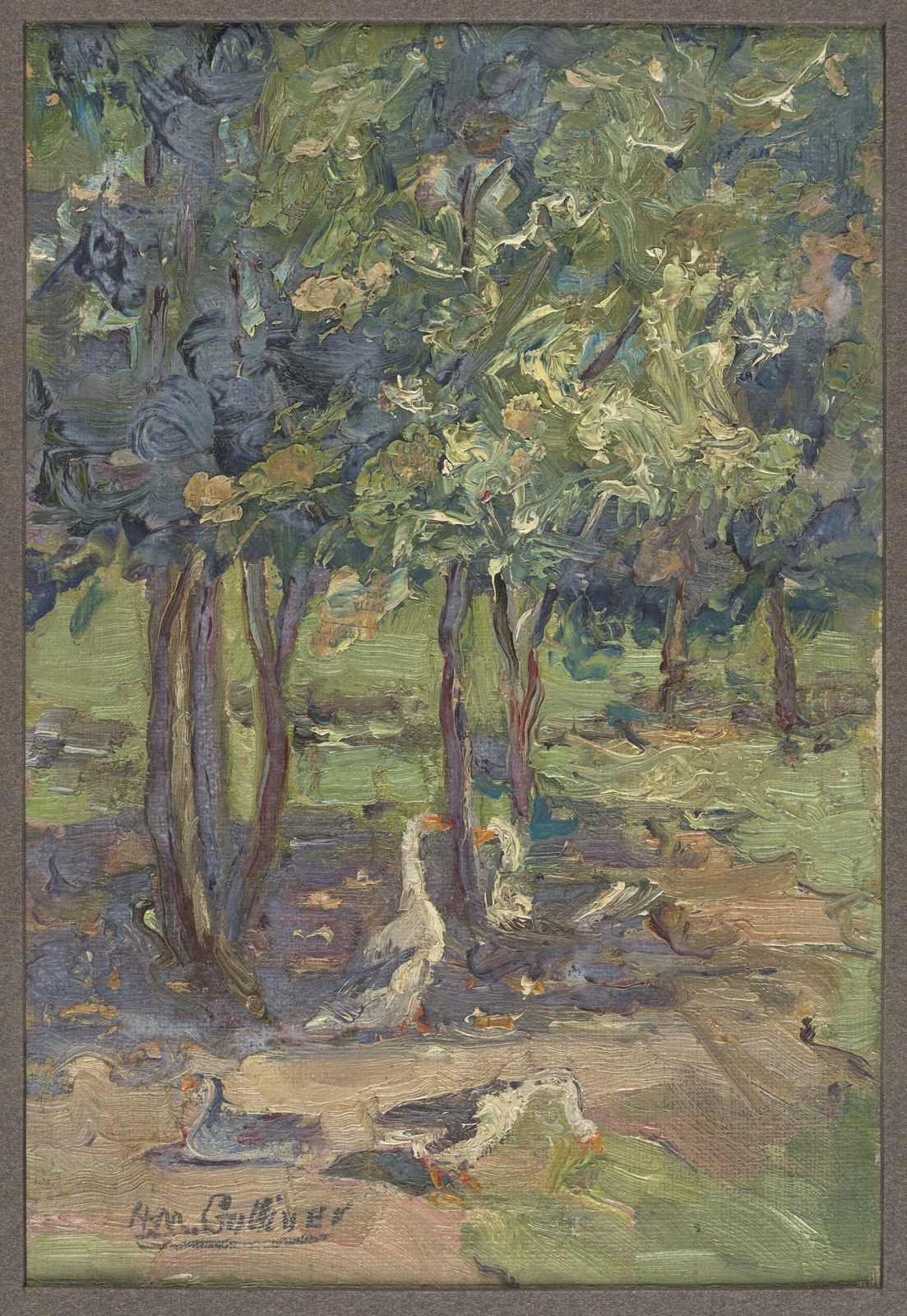
Ducks, Henrietta Maria Gulliver

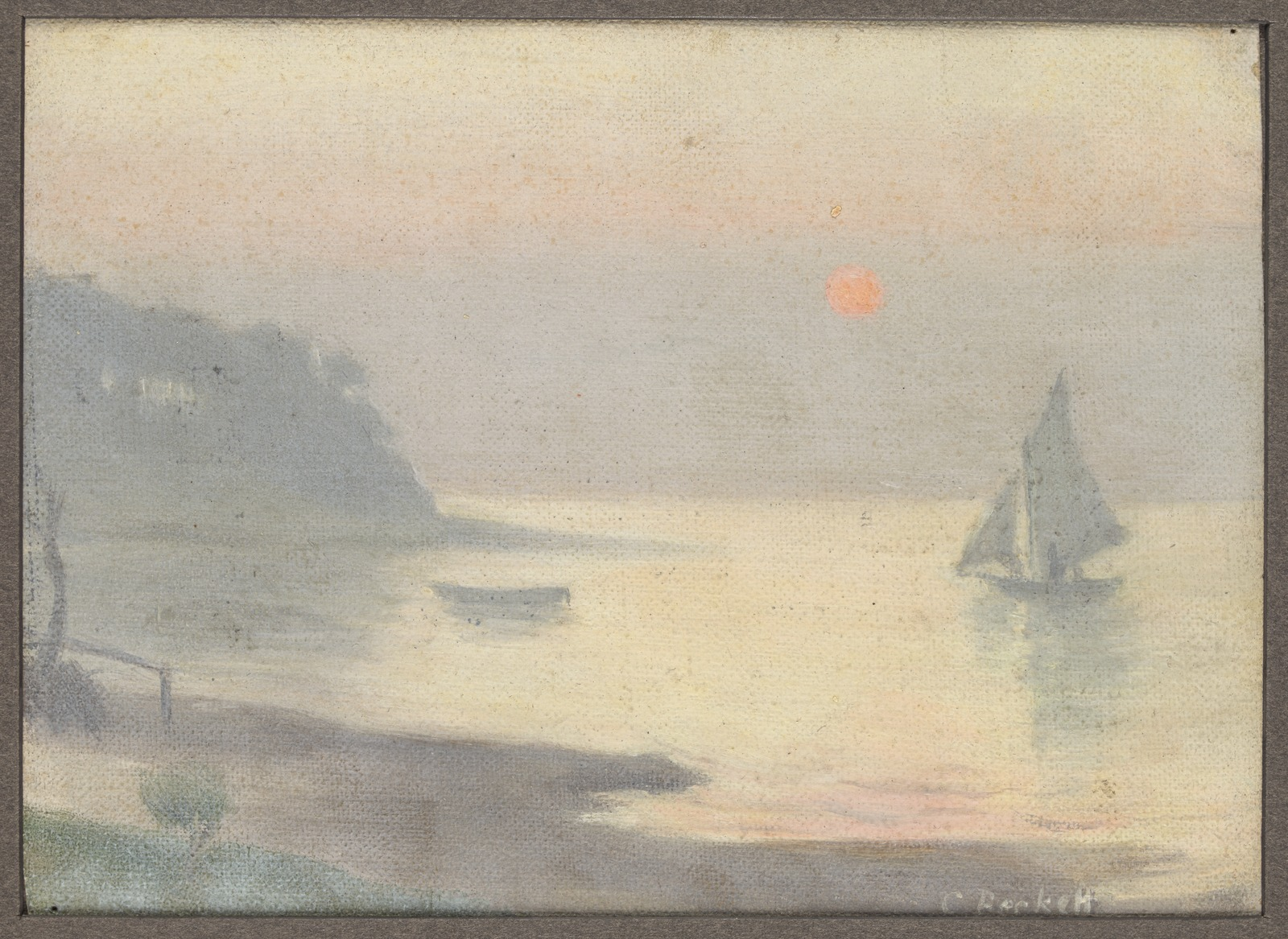
Boat on water, Clarice Beckett

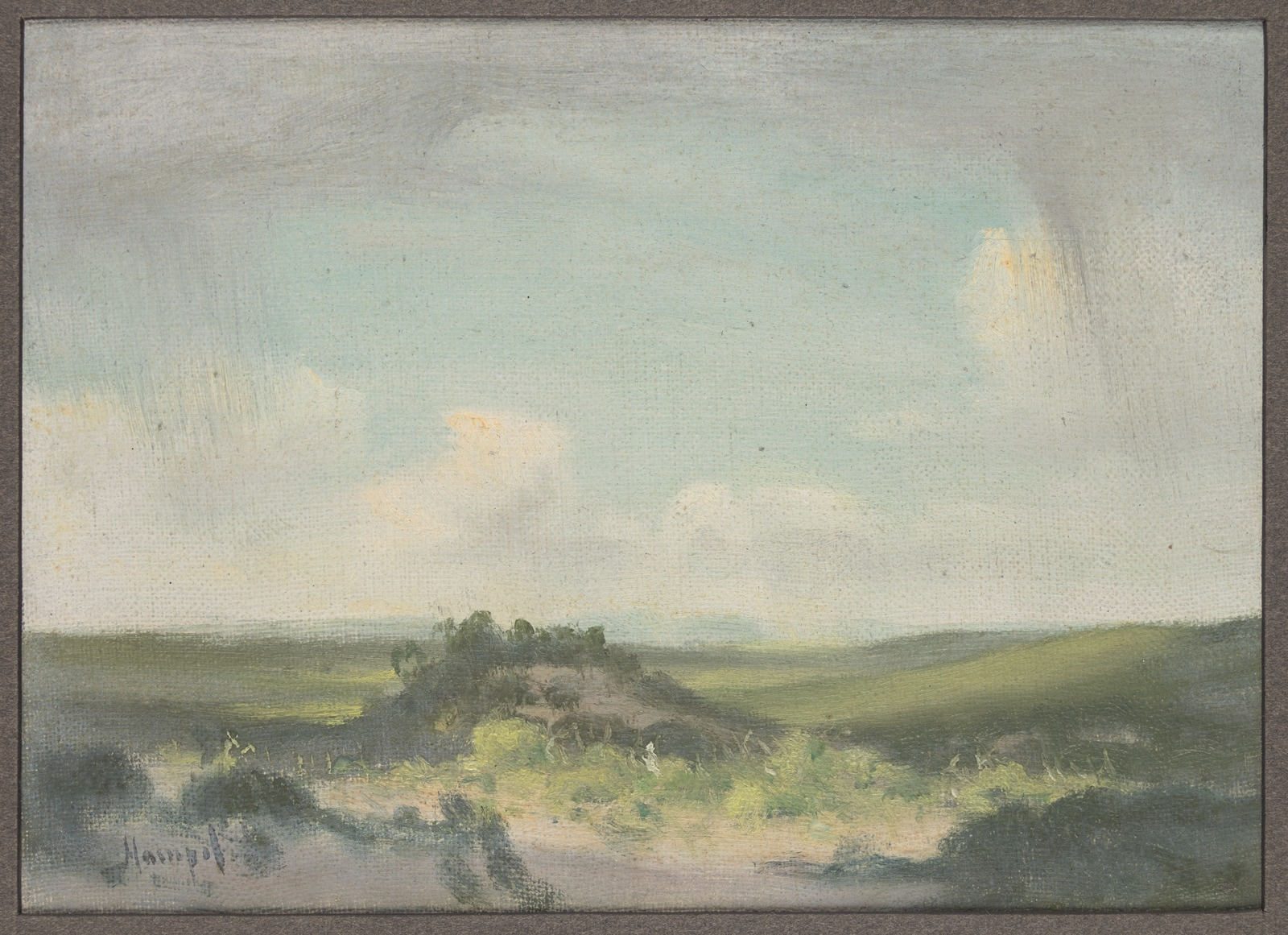
Landscape, Carl Hampel

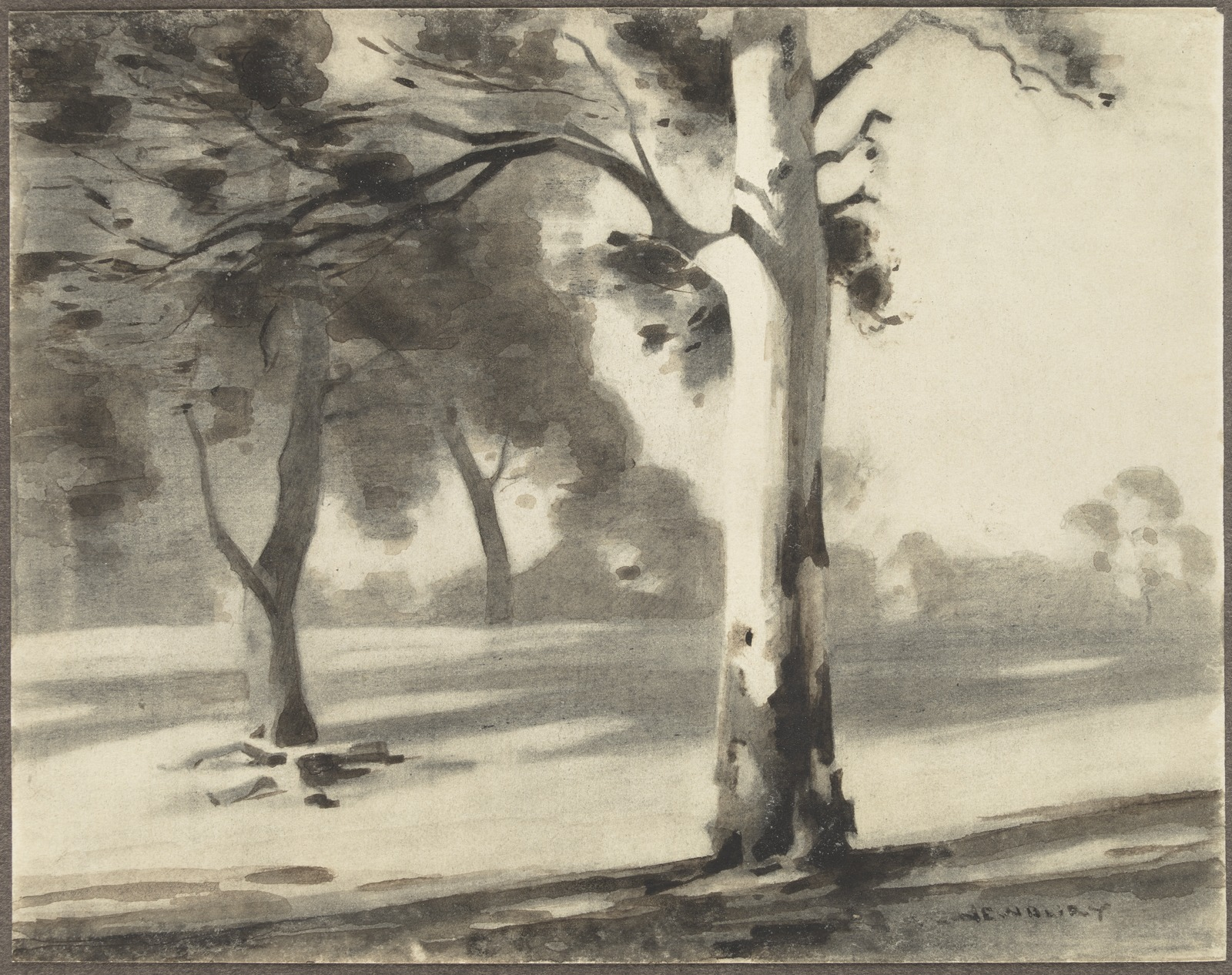
Trees and paddock, Albert Ernest Newbury
