= Jo Sweatman =

Australian painter

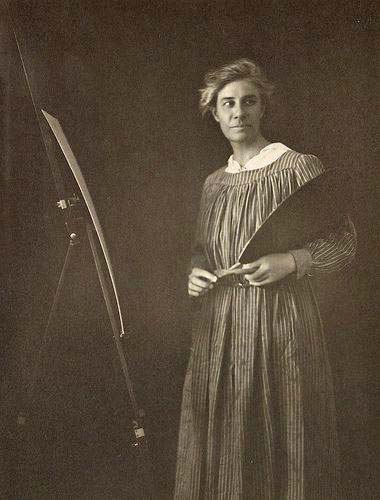
- Sweatman portrait by May and Mina Moore
- Born: Estelle Mary Sweatman; 1872; South Yarra, Victoria
- Died: 1956 (aged 83–84)
- Known for: Painting

Estelle Mary (Jo) Sweatman (1872-1956), was an Australian painter. She was a founding member of the Twenty Melbourne Painters Society.

== Early life and training ==
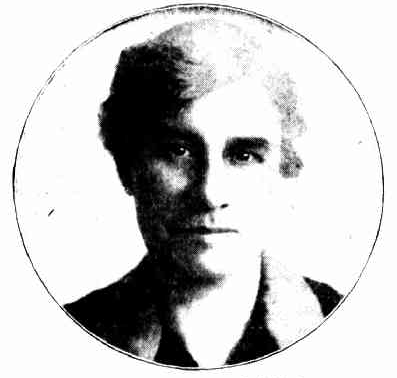

Sweatman was born in South Yarra 1872. She took drawing classes at a suburban ladies' college, and was recommended by her teacher to join the National Gallery School, where she studied for two years under Frederick McCubbin. She also studied painting while at the school with Bernard Hall.

== Career ==
Sweatman taught at Melbourne Girls Grammar, where Clarice Beckett was one of her pupils.

She was initially involved with the Victorian Artists' Society but her support for Max Meldrum eventually led to her being ousted along with friend A.M.E. Bale. She started her career painting portraits but her love of nature and a move to Warrandyte prompted a concentration on landscape, as reported of her 1929 exhibition at the Melbourne Athenaeum in The Cairns Post;

Miss Jo Sweatman, the Melbourne artist, is one who delights to paint the beauties of nature as she finds them on a bush track. There is no gainsaying that some of these bits of sunlight and shade round the gum trees make very attractive landscapes. In Miss Sweatman's recent exhibition at the Athenaeum there were on view "White Gums" and views of more distant tree topped ranges. Warrandyte, a little township on thc Yarra, has for some time been the happy hunting ground of artists, for it has many a beauty spot, and here Miss Sweatman has gone for some of her best bush scenes. Figures and flowers were included in the exhibition but probably most people would covet most one of the bush scenes which are so truly Australian.

Building her house 'The Kipsy' next door to fellow artist Clara Southern, they both took an active role in developing the artistic community in Warrandyte, Victoria. She helped establish annual art exhibitions with the Warrandyte Women's Auxiliary Association, serving on a committee of resident artists as secretary.

Sweatman was a founding member of the group, Twenty Melbourne Painters Society, that was formed by students and followers of Australian Tonalist Max Meldrum. Sweatman was considered to be one of Australia's most famous painters of wattle.

In 1922 Sweatman was a finalist for the Archibald Prize for her Portrait Miss A.M.E. Bale. The same year A.M.E. Bale was a finalist with her portrait of Miss Jo Sweatman. Sweatman died in 1956.

== Exhibitions ==
- South Australian Society of Arts 9th annual exhibition, November 1906
- Victorian Artists' Society 18th annual exhibition, East Melbourne Galleries, October 1913
- Group exhibition, Athenaeum Gallery, July 1919
- Australian Art Association annual exhibition, Athenaeum Gallery, 1–15 October 1920
- Group exhibition (Jo Sweatman, A.M.E. Bale, Bernice Edwell), Athenaeum Gallery, November 1923
- Twenty Melbourne Painters Society, Queen's Hall, November 1924
- Twenty Melbourne Painters Society, Athenaeum Gallery, 15–29 September 1925
- Solo exhibition, Decoration Gallery, May 1926 (catalogue)
- Twenty Melbourne Painters Society 8th annual exhibition, Athenaeum Gallery, 14–25 September 1926
- Jo Sweatman & A.M.E. Bale, Athenaeum Gallery, 28 March - 9 April 1927
- Twenty Melbourne Painters Society 10th annual exhibition, Athenaeum Gallery, September 1928
- Twenty Melbourne Painters Society 11th annual exhibition, 24 September - 5 October 1929
- Solo exhibition, Athenaeum Gallery, April 1929
- Australian landscapes, Athenaeum Gallery, 9–20 May 1933
- Solo exhibition, Athenaeum Gallery, 30 April - 11 May 1935 (catalogue)
- Solo exhibition, Athenaeum Gallery, May 1937 (catalogue)
- Solo exhibition, Athenaeum Gallery, 18–29 May 1943
- Solo exhibition, Athenaeum Gallery, 22 May - 2 June 1945
- Twenty Melbourne Painters Society, Athenaeum Gallery, 3–14 September 1946
- Solo exhibition, Athenaeum Gallery, May 1947

== Collections ==
- Hamilton Gallery,
- Castlemaine Art Museum,
- National Gallery of Victoria.
