= Albert Ernest Newbury =

Australian artist (1891–1941)

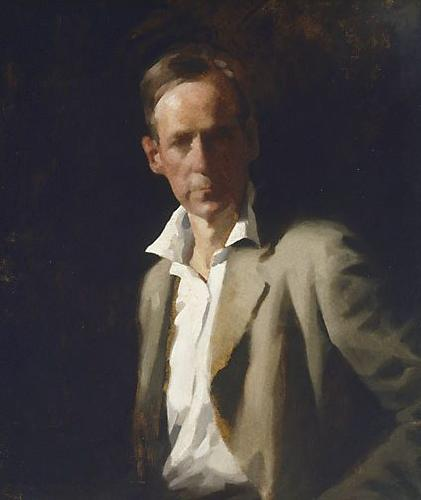
Albert Ernest Newbury (self portrait)

Albert Ernest Newbury (29 January 1891 – 1 April 1941) was an Australian artist who was associated with the Australian tonalist movement.

== Career ==
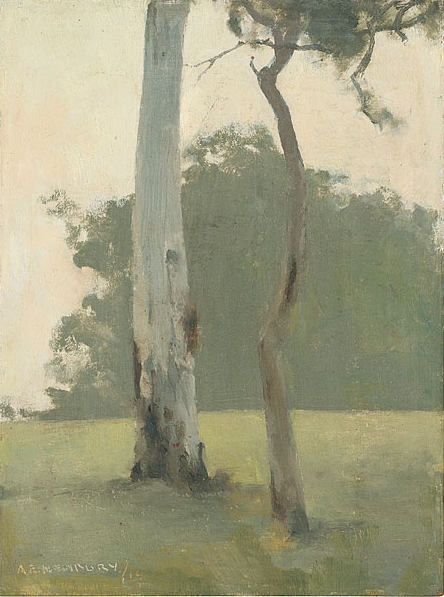
Eltham, 1919

Newbury was born in Melbourne, one of the five sons of Samuel Newbury (1854–1930) and his wife Jessie Susannah Newbury née Dowsett. Samuel was the headmaster of Albert Park Grammar School; the Congregationalist minister Alfred Charles Newbury was an elder brother. Albert spent most of his childhood in Geelong. In 1909, at the age of 18, Newbury entered the National Gallery of Victoria Art School, Melbourne, where he was a student of Frederick McCubbin, Bernard Hall, and Max Meldrum.
