= Colin Colahan =

Australian painter & sculptor (1897–1987)

Colin Cuthbert Orr Colahan
- Born: 12 February 1897; Woodend, Victoria, Australia
- Died: 6 June 1987 (aged 90); Ventimiglia, Italy
- Education: Xavier College, Melbourne
- Occupations: Painter; Sculptor

Colin Cuthbert Orr Colahan (12 February 1897 – 6 June 1987) was an Australian painter and sculptor.

Colahan was born in Woodend, Victoria, in 1897, the second youngest of the six children of Surgeon-Major-General John Joseph Aloysius Colahan (1836–1918), and Eliza McDowell Colahan (1859–1899), née Orr. He was educated at Xavier College in Melbourne.

After a few years at the National Gallery of Victoria Art School, Colahan joined Max Meldrum's school of painting and subsequently became a key figure of the Australian tonalist movement. In 1937 he joined and exhibited with Robert Menzies' Australian Academy of Art.

Colahan created the 'Sirena' fountain for the Italian town of Bordighera. His sculpture of the head of Victor Smorgon was bought by the National Gallery of Victoria. His work can be found in the collections of the state galleries of Melbourne, Adelaide and Brisbane. He was appointed an Australian official war artist in 1942.

A portrait in oil of F. Matthias Alexander (of "Alexander technique" fame), painted by Colahan to commemorate the subject's 80th birthday, was shown on the BBC's Antiques Roadshow programme in May 2013, when it was still in the possession of the son of the wife of Alexander's nephew.

Colahan died in Ventimiglia in 1989.
