= Rose A. Walker =

Australian painter

- Born: 1879; Walhalla, Victoria, Australia
- Died: 1942 (aged 62–63)
- Known for: Painting
- Spouse: George Hartrick

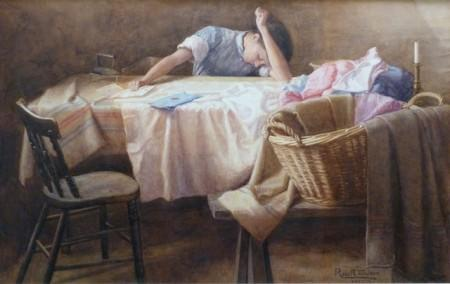
Rose A. Walker (1900) News from the Front, watercolour, 61.5 x 96.3 cm, Castlemaine Art Museum

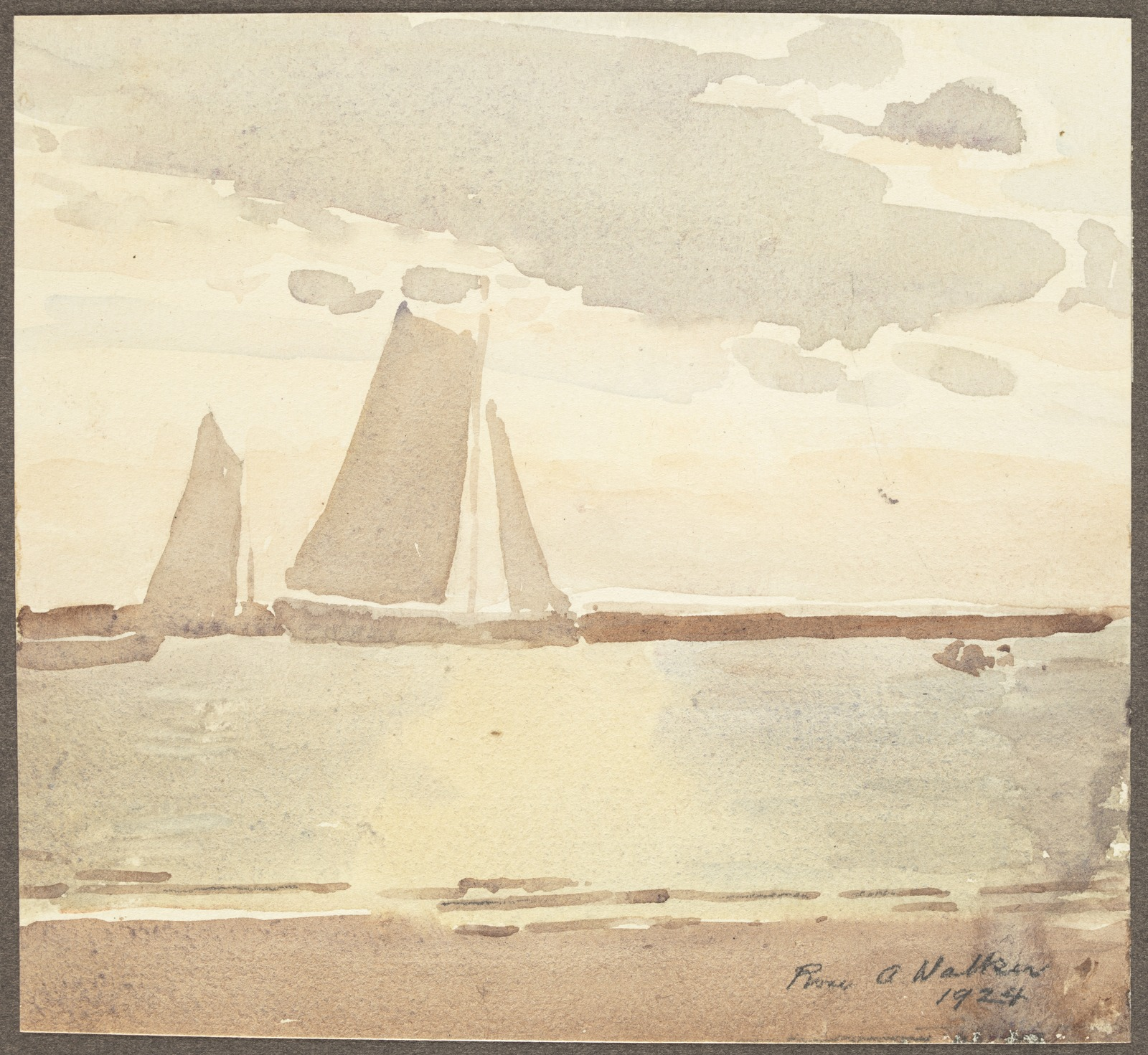
Yachts on bay, 1924, State Library Victoria

Rose A. Walker (1879–1942), was an Australian painter and miniaturist. She was a founding member of the Twenty Melbourne Painters Society.

== Biography ==
Walker was born in Walhalla in 1879. She attended the Bendigo School of Mines where she studied under Arthur T. Woodward. She then moved to Melbourne where she studied with Max Meldrum.

Bendigo Art Gallery displayed her narrative painting, a watercolour, News from the Front, in its Victorian Gold Jubilee exhibition of 1901-1902, and its subsequent purchase from admission fees and art union was debated in a drawn-out selection process of elimination over April–June 1902, in which it remained the only work by a woman and in competition against eight notables including Gustave Doré, Rupert Bunney, Julian Ashton and J. Ford Patterson. Ultimately the Gallery purchased the large Doré Joseph's Flight Into Egypt. News from the Front was shown as a non-competitive entry in the Australian Exhibition of Women's Work and gifted by the artist to Castlemaine Art Museum in 1940.

Walker exhibited her work around Melbourne at the Victorian Artists Society, and the Athenaeum Gallery. She showed her work under the name "Mrs George Hartrick" after she wed.

She was a member of the Victorian Artists Society, the Twenty Melbourne Painters Society and the Melbourne Society of Women Painters and Sculptors.

She died in 1942.

In 2013 Walker was included in the exhibition Towards Perth: Western Australian Women Artists Before 1950 at the Lawrence Wilson Art Gallery in Crawley, Australia.
