= Justus Jorgensen =

Australian artist

Justus Jorgensen (12 May 1893 – 15 May 1975) was an Australian artist and architect. He is best known for establishing the artist colony Montsalvat, located in Eltham.

He was born in East Brighton, Melbourne, third of six children of Simon Jorgensen, a master mariner from Norway, and his Victorian-born wife Nora, née Schreiber. He was a student of Max Meldrum and an early member of his Australian tonalist movement.
