= Alice Marian Ellen Bale =

Australian artist (1875–1955)

Alice Marion Ellen Bale
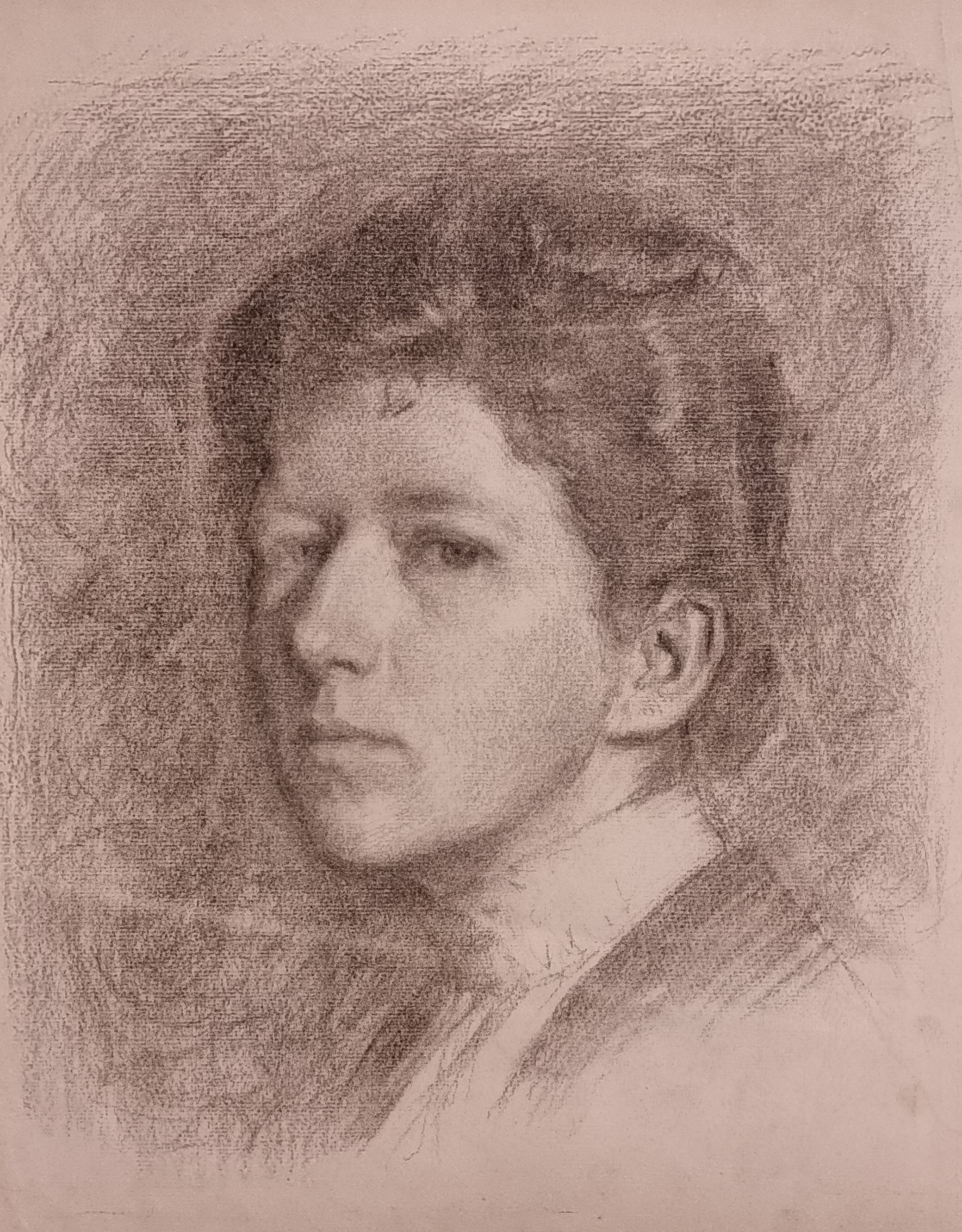
- Self portrait, Alice Bale, c. 1905
- Born: 11 November 1875; Richmond, Victoria, Australia
- Died: 14 February 1955 (aged 79); Melbourne, Australia
- Known for: Painting

Alice Marian Ellen Bale, known as A. M. E. Bale, (11 November 1875 – 14 February 1955) was an Australian artist, the editor of the Victorian Artists' Society's journal VAS and a foundation member of the Twenty Melbourne Painters Society. In her will, she left an endowment for the A. M. E. Bale Travelling Scholarship and Art Prize to support Australian artists. The endowment funds a scholarship and two prizes.

== Early life and education ==
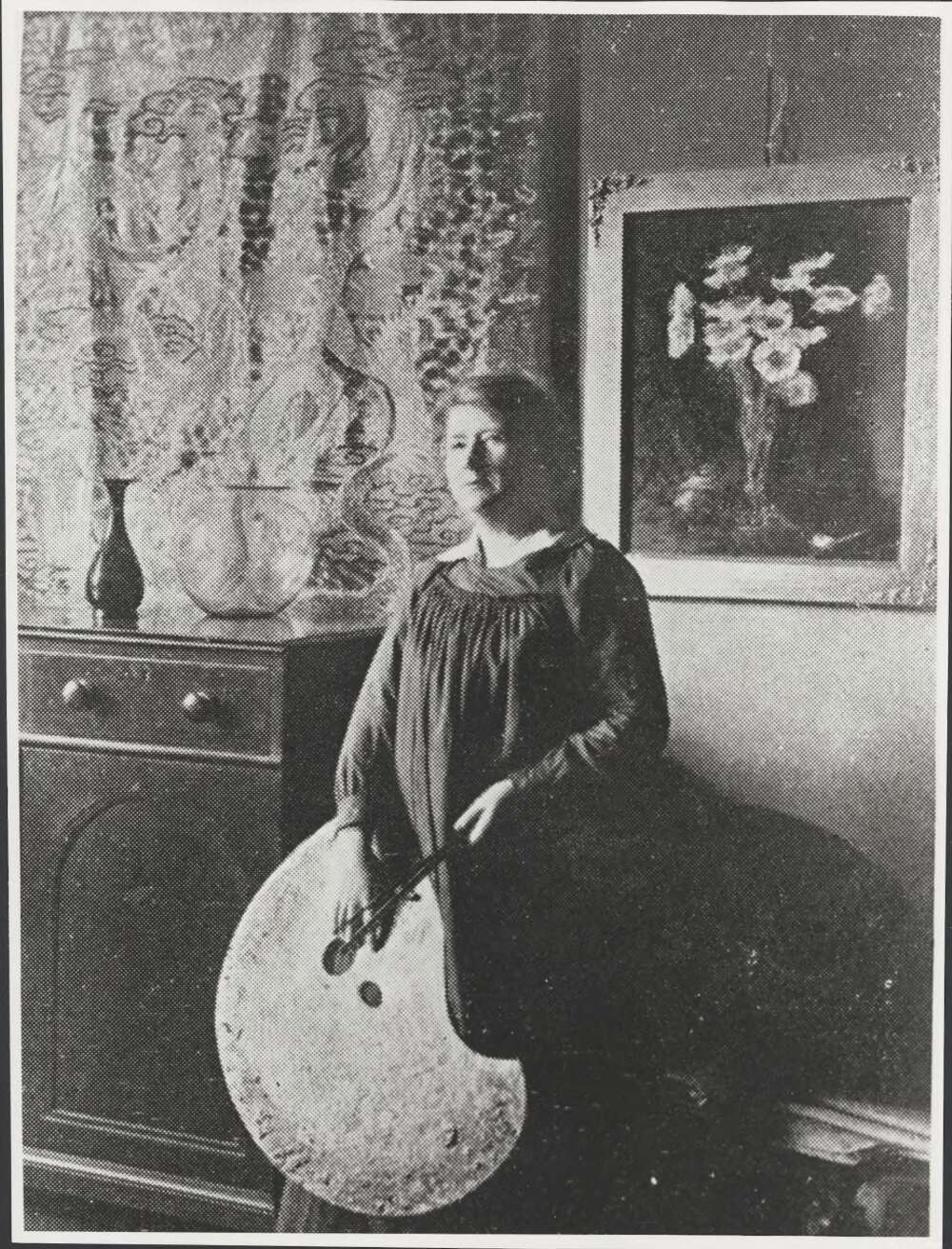
Portrait of A. M. E. Bale, 1920s

Bale was born in Richmond, Victoria, on 11 November 1875, the daughter of Marian and naturalist William Mountier Bale. She was an only child, and her family had houses in both Kew and Castlemaine.

She studied art under Frederick McCubbin and Lindsay Bernard Hall at the National Gallery School 1895–1904.

== Career ==
Bale came to prominence as an artist in Melbourne in the 1920s and 1930s, developing a reputation as one of Australia's pre-eminent flower and still life painters. Distancing herself from her fellow female artists who were more aligned with the suffragette movement, Bale preferred to work hard within the constraints of the traditional structures of the art world, and never left Victoria. An active member of the Pickwick Club of Kew, she would gather with young members, some of whom were fellow Gallery School students, for weekly discussions where they adopted the personas of Charles Dickens' characters. There she developed an intimacy with fellow club member Norman Brown, which came to an end by 1906 with Brown's departure and Bale's reluctance to leave her ordered family life.

As a painter Bale did landscapes and portraits but was best known for her flower studies. She was able to sell her paintings and exhibit in not just Australia but also London and Paris.

She exhibited with the Melbourne Society of Women Painters 1917–1955.

== Other activities ==
Bale edited the Victorian Artists' Society's journal VAS before her efforts to reform the society in 1917 and 1918 and an election loss got her ousted as a troublemaker. Her friend Jo Sweatman, the last remaining female office bearer, was ousted also a few months later on an electoral technicality. They became foundation members of the Twenty Melbourne Painters Society, Bale holding the position of secretary until her death and was among others who declared themselves against an Australian Academy of Art proposed by Robert Menzies, including Isabel May Tweddle and Norman Macgeorge; Bale wrote to the Governor General protesting the formation of the Academy.

A. M. E. Bale, National Gallery of Victoria

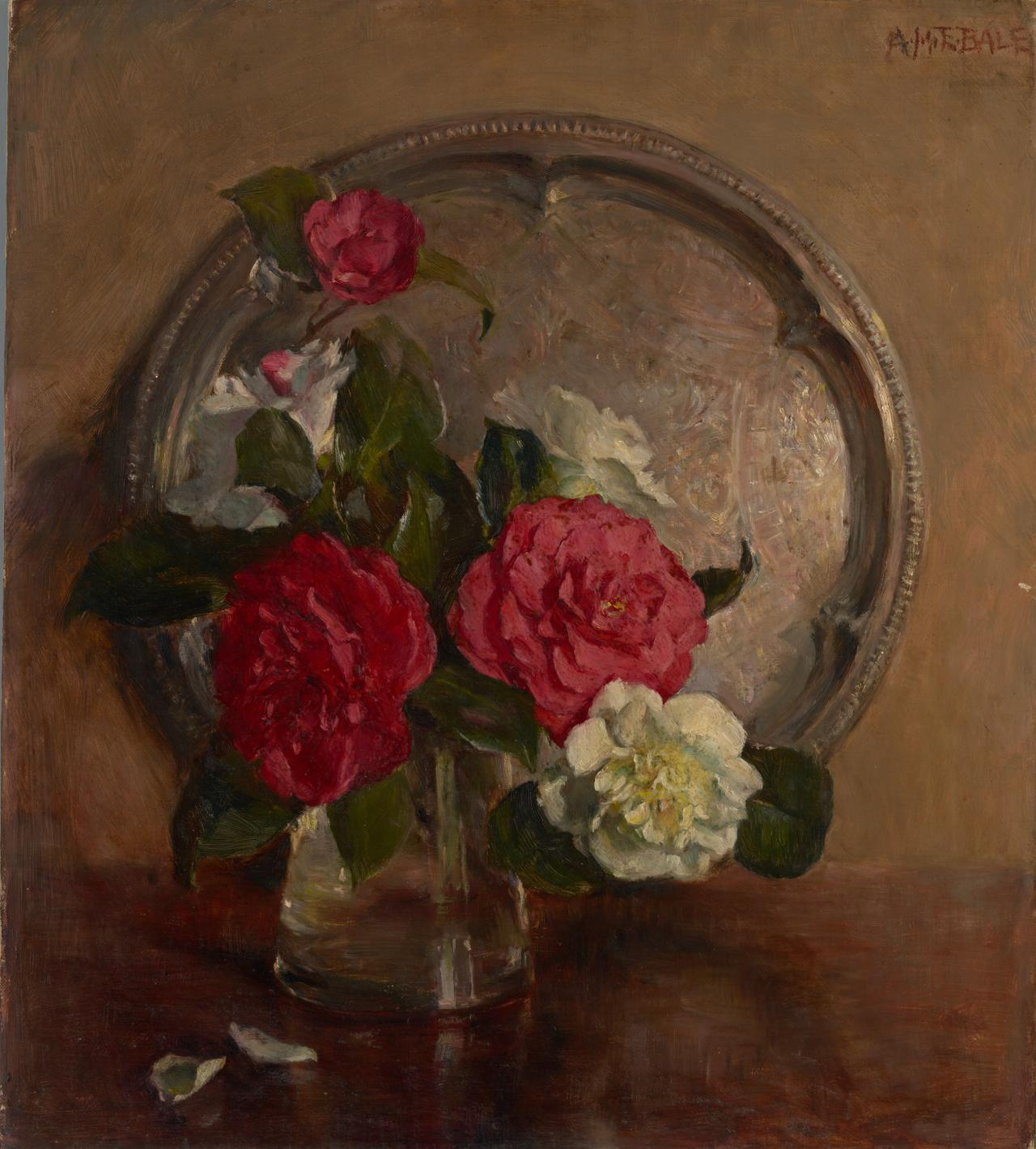
Camelias, [ca. 1930]

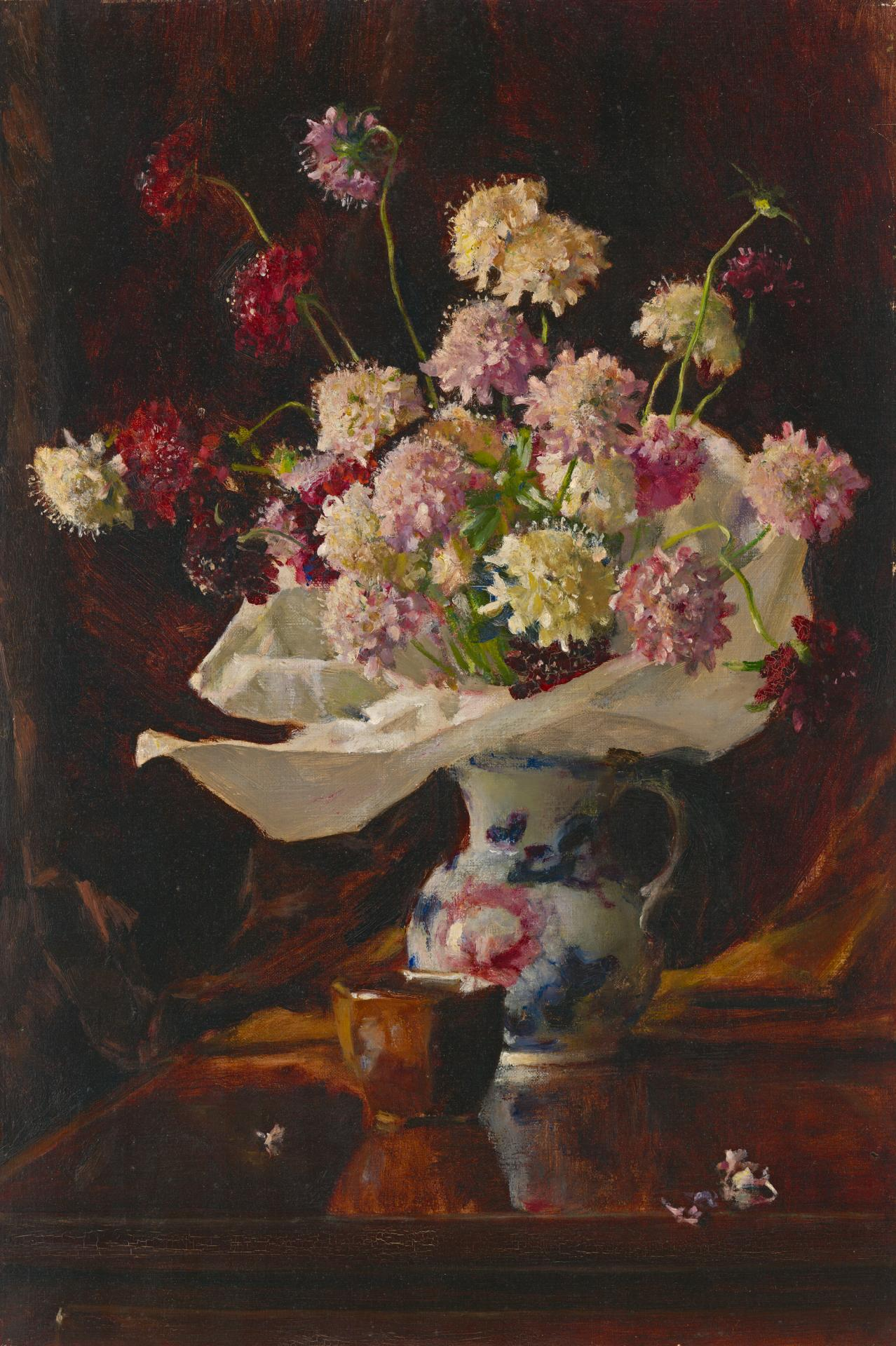
Scabiosa, [ca. 1922]

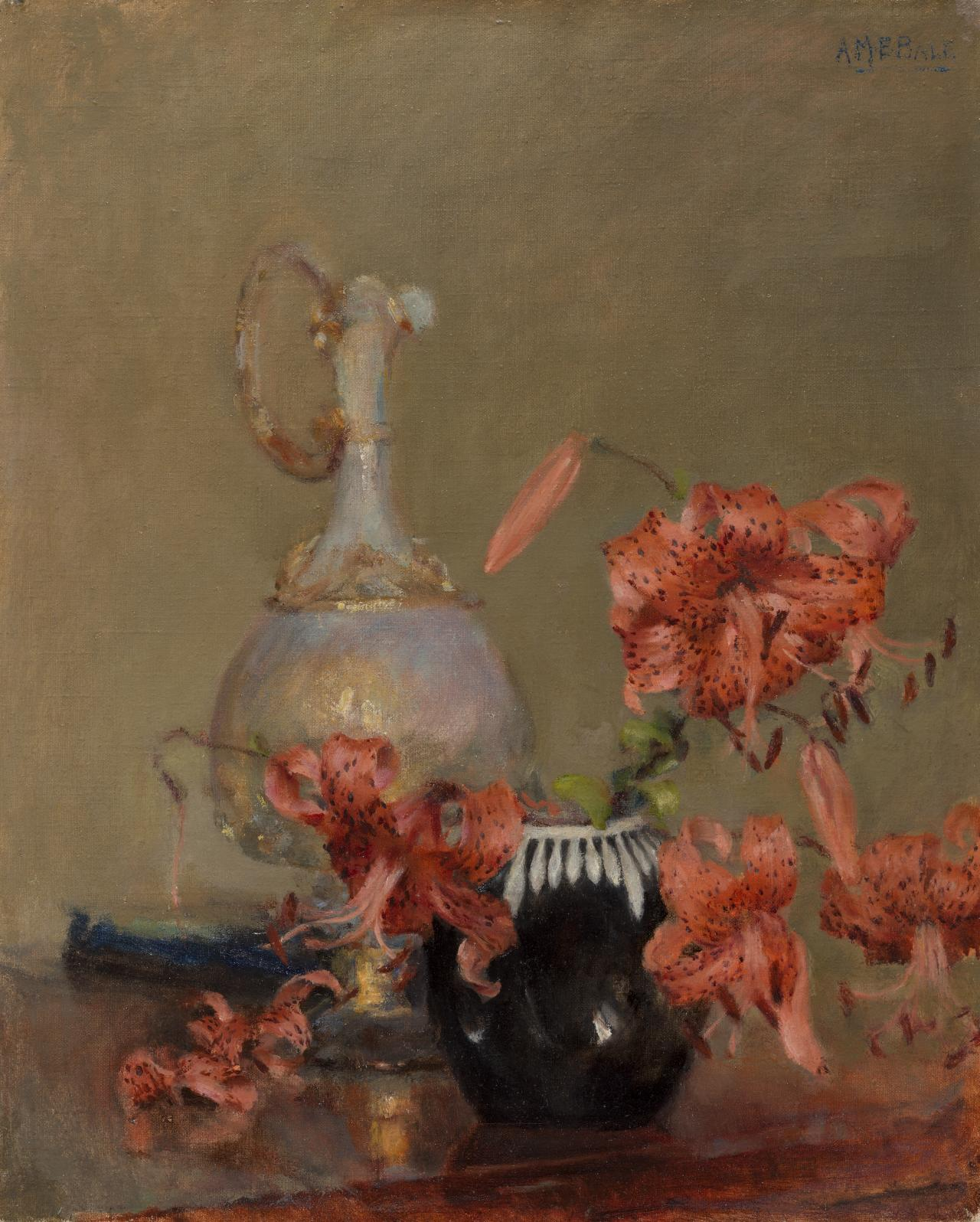
Tiger lilies, [ca. 1930]

== In collections ==
- Art Gallery of New South Wales,
- National Gallery of Victoria.
- Castlemaine Art Museum

== Awards ==
She was a finalist in the Archibald Prize in 1922, and 1924, while 1932 Ernest Buckmaster's portrait of her was a finalist in the Archibald.

== Death and legacy ==
Bale died on 14 February 1955 in Melbourne.

=== A. M. E. Bale Travelling Scholarship and Art Prize ===
Bale established the biennial A. M. E. Bale Travelling Scholarship and Art Prize through her will to support Australian artists in perpetuity. The prize "is intended to encourage, support and advance classical training of emerging artists (in their early to mid-career) at any stage of life, who are pursuing the study and practice of traditional art and who desire to study the works of old masters".

Three prizes are awarded:

- Major Award for a Travelling Scholarship (A$50,000) since 2011
- A. M. E. Bale Art Prize in the medium of oil and/or acrylic (A$5,000)
- A. M. E. Bale Art Prize for Works on Paper (A$5,000)

In 1977, Peter Wegner was awarded the A. M. E. Bale residential painting scholarship under Sir William Dargie, awarded by Glen Eira City Council, which he undertook from 1978 to 1980.
