= List of exhibitions at the Castlemaine Art Museum =

The Castlemaine Art Museum in Castlemaine, Victoria, Australia has held many exhibitions since it was founded in 1913.

== List of exhibitions ==
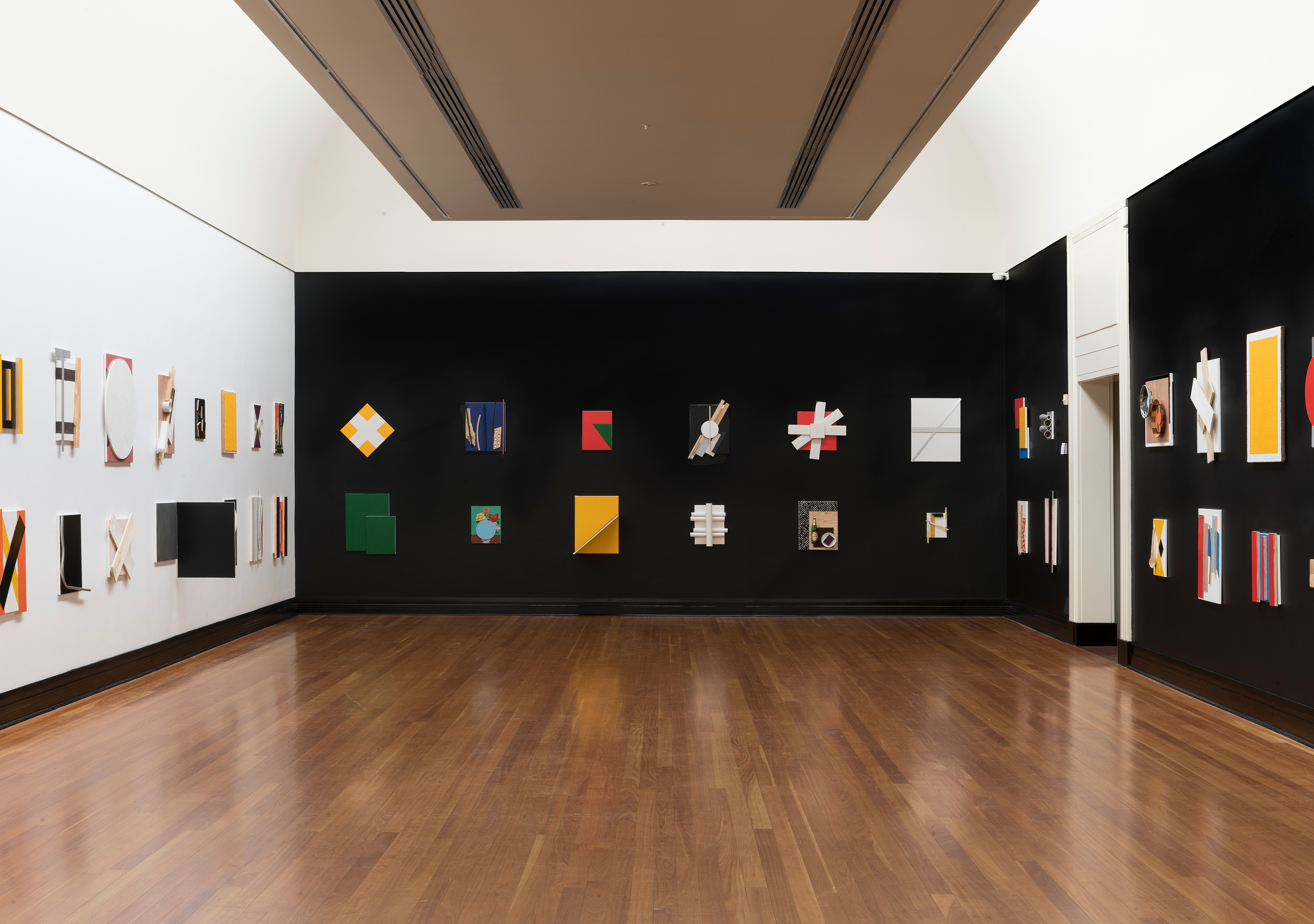
19 March–25 June 2017 exhibition of John Nixon's EPW in the Stoneman Gallery of Castlemaine Art Museum

=== 1913–1920 ===
- 1913, 22–25 October: Loan Exhibition, Castlemaine Town Hall
- 1914, October: Fifty Medici Society coloured photographic reproductions of Old Masters 14th–19th century, on loan from Bendigo Art Gallery
- 1915, from 2 November: Watercolours by Reginald Sturgess and Miss M. Townsend

=== 1921–1960 ===
- 1926, June: 21 recent acquisitions and 25 works on loan
- 1928, 22 October: Art Prize: 51 entries in watercolour or oil, winner William Rowell
- 1933, 3 December: Unveiling of W. B. Mclnnes portrait of the Duke of York, officiated by General Sir Henry Chauvel
- 1935, June: Exhibition of Prints
- 1946, June: Contemporary Sydney Painters
- 1947, January: British contemporary paintings, loan from National Gallery of Victoria
- 1948, 6–27 November: Contemporary Art of South Australia : Exhibition of Paintings
- 1951, 21–30 August: Dunlop Prize Winning Collection of Australian Art
- 1952/3, 9 December–3 February: Castlemaine Residents' Art Exhibition: 40 paintings from 38 district homes

=== 1961–1970 ===
- 1963, July: Junior Art Prize
- 1963, 1 September: Prints '63, Studio One Printmakers, Tate Adams, Barbara Brash, Janet Dawson, Grahame King, Hertha Kluge-Pott, Jan Senbergs, Fred Williams
- 1963, November: Exhibition of Religious and Applied Art
- 1964, 5–7 November: First Castlemaine National Exhibition of Photography
- 1966, 3–5 November: Third Castlemaine National Exhibition of Photography
- 1967, 19–21 October: Fourth Castlemaine National Exhibition of Photography
- 1968, 7–9 November: Fifth Castlemaine National Exhibition of Photography
- 1969, 6–8 November: Sixth Castlemaine National Exhibition of Photography

=== 1971–1980 ===
- 1971, 15–31 March: Rosemary Fazakerley
- 1971, 6–8 May: Seventh Castlemaine National Exhibition of Photography
- 1972, 29 April – 21 May 1972: An exhibition of fifty chairs of the 19th and early 20th centuries
- 1974, September: Die Basler Fasnacht: A collection of drawings on the theme of the traditional March carnival in Basel, Switzerland
- 1975, 24 March – 15 November: Arts Victoria Statewide Festival
- 1975, 2 May – 22 June: Artists and Central Victoria, for Arts Victoria '74
- 1975, 15 August – 22 September: The Meldrum School
- 1975, 7 November – 5 December: Crafts Victoria 75: a survey of contemporary crafts in Victoria
- 1976, 12 March – 12 April: Cartoons Political + Non Political
- 1976, 14 April – 5 May: Erica Beilharz and Helen Harrison: Fibre and Form
- 1976, 16 May – 27 June: Self portraits
- 1976: Reginald Sturgess, 73 works
- 1976, 16 October – 28 November: A.E. Newbury
- 1977, 13 April – 1 May: The Callow Collection: Watercolours by Constable, Turner, Cox, Rowlandson and Sandby
- 1977, 7 May – 29 May: Dora Serle: an exhibition of paintings and drawings
- 1977, 12 June – 3 July: Elsie Barlow 1876–1948
- 1977, 11 September – 30 October: A. M. E. Bale
- 1978, 5–31 March: The Leviny Family, an early craft family of Castlemaine: silver, jewellery, design, embroidery, enamelling
- 1978 10 June – 1 July: Marc Clark: sculptures 1968–78
- 1978, 22 August – 4 September: Tribal And Traditional Textiles. The 1978 National Gallery of Victoria Travelling Exhibition
- 1978, 10–29 September: The Newell family
- 1978, 1–29 October: The Colquhouns: a creative and productive family
- 1978, 4–26 November: Fibre craft work by local artisans
- 1979, to 3 June: Art metal craft by S. J. Ellis, craftsman and teacher
- 1979, 12 September – 10 October: Aspects of Australian Art 1900–1940: Australian National Gallery Touring exhibition
- 1980, 13 April – 25 May: James McNeill Whistler:Notes, nocturnes & harmonies
- 1980, 3–24 August: 20th Anniversary Exhibition of the Embroiderer's Guild

=== 1981–1990 ===
- 1981, 8 March – 5 April: Merryle Johnson
- 1981, to 10 May: Castlemaine Art Gallery and Historical Museum 50th Anniversary: Royal Doulton Ceramic Ware
- 1981, 19 July – 23 August: Five Australian Expatriates: Bunny, Coates, Longstaff, Meldrum & Quinn
- 1981, 6 September – 4 October: Two centuries of Australian bird illustrations
- 1981, 25 October – 23 November: Aspects of Castlemaine, 1854–1980
- 1982, 24 March – 2 May: Twenty years of acquisitions, 1962–1982
- 1982, 8 May – 27 June: Pictures from Private Collections
- 1982, 12 August–5 September: E. Phillips Fox and Ethel Carrick: An Exhibition of Impressionist Landscapes
- 1983, June: Frater and Shore: Pioneer Modernists
- 1983, 22 August – 12 September: Print Council Exhibition 10
- 1983, 18 September – 23 October: Polly Hurry, 1883–1963: a retrospective
- 1983: David Chapman 1927–1983: works on paper
- 1984, to 1 April: Works by Edward B. Heffernan
- 1984, 6 May – 2 June 1984: Kathlyn Ballard, 1946–1984
- 1984, 1 November–2 December: Russell Drysdale
- 1985, 2 March – 31 March: Selected Works from the Diamond Valley Art Collection
- 1985, 21 July – 11 August: Sydney: a frame of mind: photographs by Graeme Dawes
- 1985 18 August–15 September: Fifty Chairs of the 18th, 19th and 20th Centuries
- 1986: Victoria, views by contemporary artists
- 1986, 13–30 July: Margaret Pestell 1894–1984
- 1986, 13 September–5 October: Painters, Potters, Printmakers & Photographers from Castlemaine and District
- 1986, to 7 December: R. W. Sturgess, Watercolorist 1892–1932
- 1987, 5 April – 3 May: Pubs and breweries of Castlemaine and district
- 1987, 20 September–25 October: Harley C. Griffiths, 1908–1981
- 1987, 12 October – 31 October: Trefor Prest: Sculpture
- 1987, December: Central Victorian Sculptors
- 1988, 16 September – 23 October: An Aspect of Australian Art: Three Private Collections in Central Victoria
- 1988, September: Selection from 30 years of acquisitions
- 1988, 29 October – 20 November: Shotei lbata
- 1988, 29 October – 4 December: Miles Evergood, 1871–1939: retrospective
- 1989, January: Percy Leason, 1889–1959: centenary exhibition
- 1989, 5–27 August: 9x5 Centenary Exhibition
- 1990, 13 July–5 August: The Sybil Craig Bequest
- 1990, 10 August–2 September: Iskustvo: Recent Soviet painting
- 1990, November: Aspects of France: the Australian Artists View, 50 works by Australian artists from John Peter Russell to Lloyd Rees
- 1990, to 2 December: Annemieke Mein: Textiles

=== 1991–2000 ===
- 1991, April: Maladies, medicos & miracle cures: a guide to the history of medicine in Castlemaine and district from 1851–c.1950
- 1991, 16 June–7 July: Harley Griffiths Snr. (1878–1951): works on paper
- 1991, 14 July–11 August: Rupert Bunny's Landscapes of the South of France
- 1991: 25 August–15 September: Arthur J. Lindsay, 1912–1990: retrospective
- 1991, 13 October–3 November: Ten regional artists: Steve Beckley, Liz Caffin, Paul Cavell, Ian Drummond, John Gleeson, Craig Gough, Douglas Green, Juliana Hilton, Ken Killeen, Vicky Taylor
- 1991, November: Nature's Inspiration: Arts in the Garden
- 1992, to 3 May: A history of horticulture in Castlemaine and district
- 1992, 13 July–20 August: Completing the picture: women artists and the Heidelberg era
- 1992, 20 September – 25 October: The Art of Christian Waller
- 1992, 31 October – 6 December: Gwyn Hanssen Pigott: ceramics
- 1992, 31 October – 6 December: Harold Herbert, Watercolours 1918–44
- 1993, March–April: Religion in the Goldfields
- 1993, 18 June–17 July: Wendy Stavrianos
- 1993 to 29 August: Ray Taylor: Ceramic Artist
- 1993, to 12 September: Greg Stirling: Enchanted Wood
- 1994, 6 March – 10 April: Flynn silver, past and present
- 1994, 15 May – 12 June: Wendy Stavrianos: Mantles of Darkness
- 1994, to 2 October: Charles Bush: Self Portraits 1936–1986
- 1994, 29 October – 4 December: John Dent: retrospective 1973–1993
- 1995, 5 March–30 April: Australian Women Printmakers 1910–1940, curated by Kirsten McKay of the Castlemaine gallery, touring exhibition
- 1996: Historic wallpapers in Australia, 1850–1920
- 1996, 30 March–5 May: Rosemary Fazakerley 1941-1992: A memorial exhibition
- 1996, 2 November – 8 December: Tony Lloyd-Stephenson: 1921–1994
- 1997: Mt. Alexander Printmakers' Show
- 1997: 2 February – 30 March: Sculpture by Fiona Orr, 1979–1997: a journey, abstraction to figuration to landscape
- 1997, 12 October – 23 November: Australian artists influenced by Rembrandt
- 1998: Jan Lancaster: Bloodlines – The Coliban
- 1998 Janet Goodchild-Cuffley, Women of History
- 1998, 9–30 August: Achievement Through Art, Student Art Exhibition Regional Tour, works of students in Years 4–10
- 1999, to 11 April: The Private Eye A Foreigner's Power of Observation: contemporary artworks by Vicki McConville sourcing the cultural and historical archives of Central Victoria
- 1999, 24 April – 4 May: Ian Armstrong Retrospective
- 1999, 27 June – 2 August: Pam Hallandal: drawings
- 2000, 4 October – 10 December: The Beth Sinclair Donation of Australian Art

=== 2001–2010 ===
- 2001, 24 March to 29 April: Fraser Fair retrospective
- 2001, 27 May to 1 July: Murray Griffin – the journey: a retrospective 1922–1980
- 2002, 9 March – 7 April: Peter Wegner: sitting still, portrait studies of Graeme Doyle
- 2002, 6 April – 19 May: Martin Lewis: stepping into the light
- 2002, 28 July – 25 August: A tribute to June Davies
- 2003: David Tatnall, Seeing the Forest for the Trees
- 2003, 29 March – 4 May: Highlights from the Stuart R. Stoneman art collection
- 2003, 10 May – 8 June: Basil Eliades: Isolated connections: the landscape politic
- 2003, 6 July – 24 August: John Julian Gibbs, 1859–1887
- 2004, 1 May – 6 June: As time goes by: Prints by Marc Clark
- 2004, 3 October – 21 November: Alexander Colquhoun: 1862–1941: artist and critic
- 2005: Gus Cohen
- 2005, 2 April–1 May: Venezia Australis. Australian artists in Venice: 1900–2000
- 2006, 4 March–2 April: Eric Thake 1904–82: Works from the Permanent Collection
- 2006, 4 March–2 April: Tom Roberts: 150th birthday anniversary
- 2006, 2 April–28 May: Australian Printmaking, 1960s to the Present Day
- 2006, 4 June – 30 July: Sybil Craig 1901–89: Modernist painter
- 2006/7, 19 November – 21 January: Dorothy Mary Braund: retrospective
- 2007, 17 February–18 March: Robert Clinch: Urban Myths
- 2007, 31 March–27 May: The Art of the Dog
- 2007, 9 June–29 July: European sensibilities: George Baldessin and his circle
- 2008, 5 April–18 May: Deborah Klein: Out of the past, a survey of works 1995-2007
- 2008, to 31 August: Dick Turner : Cross Sections Layering Land and Culture
- 2008, 4 October – 2 November: Donald Ramsay, artist in a landscape: a survey exhibition
- 2008, 8 November to 14 December: Jock Clutterbuck: Sculptures & drawings 1990–2008
- 2009, 24 January–1 March: Clifton Pugh: printmaker
- 2009: Jack Courier (1915–2007): lithographs
- 2010, 28 February – 4 April:Associates of Rupert Bunny
- 2010, from 23 April: Archie & Amalie Colquhoun
- 2010, 11 September – 3 October: Annette Edwards ... a lifetime of mark making
- 2010, 13 November – 19 December: Mount Alexander Shire artists represented in the permanent collection

=== 2011–2020 ===
- 2011, 15 January – 27 February: Imagining the Orient: A National Gallery of Victoria Touring Exhibition
- 2011, 2 April – 8 May: Touring exhibition Scottish painters in Australia
- 2011, 18 June – 24 July: Douglas Watson (1920–72) Works from the Permanent Collection
- 2011, 18 June – 24 July: Victor Majzner: Location watercolours from Australia and Overseas
- 2011, 10 September – 23 October: Greg Moncrieff: now and then – : a survey exhibition of selected paintings, screen prints and mixed media works from 1974 to the present
- 2012, 14 January – 26 February: Peggy Shaw: A Retrospective
- 2012, 10 March – 29 April: Ray Pearce: Bite
- 2012, 5 May – 24 June: Max Middleton: Painter of Light
- 2012, 1 July – 29 July: Richard Crichton Profile: Selected Works
- 2012, 4 August – 2 September: Jeff Makin: Drawings
- 2012, 9 September – 28 October: John Borrack: Selected Paintings and Drawings 1970–2012
- 2012, to 9 December: Susan Weste: Elements of Nature; Meanderings With a Camera
- 2013, 5 January – 3 February: Director's Choice: Thirty-eight years of collecting
- 2013, 9 February – 10 March: R W Sturgess (1892–1932) Works from the Permanent Collection
- 2013, 16 March – 26 May: Barry Singleton: A Survey from Public and Private Collections and an Exhibition of Current Work
- 2013, 16 March – 26 May: Mediterranean Summers: Australian Artists along the French and Italian Coast
- 2013, 1 June – 28 July: Rick Amor, from Study to Painting
- 2013, 3 August – 15 September: A collective vision: prints from the Castlemaine Art Gallery permanent collection 1970–2013: a selection of works from the 1970s to 2013 celebrating the role of artists, collectors and benefactors
- 2013, 21 September – 10 November: Shimmering Light: Dora Meeson and the Thames
- 2013, 16 November – 31 December: 2013 Len Fox Painting Award
- 2013, 3 November – 9 December: Ray Stanyer and Ellen Hansa – Wither shall I wander?
- 2013, 23 November – 15 December: The Art of Jock Clutterbuck
- 2104, 1 January – 23 February: Acquisitions
- 2014, 1 January – 23 February: Dorothy Braund 1927–2013: Gouaches from the Permanent Collection
- 2014, 2–21 August: Ray Hearn: A Survey 2004 – 2014
- 2014, 1 March – 13 Apr: Wayne Viney, Singular Impressions
- 2014, 26 April – 1 June: Ann Geroe: Ceramics Survey
- 2014, 3 May – 7 June: Jennie Stewart: Works on Paper
- 2014, 7 June – 27 July: Dean Bowen Day by Day – Paintings, Sculpture, Prints and Drawings
- 2014, 2–31 August: Ray Hearn: A Survey 2004 – 2014
- 2014, 2–31 August: Peter Wegner: 1000 Years – 10 Drawings of Centenarians
- 2014, 6 September – 26 October: Ludmilla Meilerts Retrospective
- 2014, 2 November – 14 December: Bill Meyer: Nurturing the Place
- 2015, 15 January – 8 March: Ginger Riley: The Boss of Colour
- 2015, 28 February: Catherine Pilgrim. Making history: Hidden world of the Leviny women.
- 2015, 13 March – 22 March: Patrick Pound: The Museum of Holes
- 2015, 2 May – 28 June: Earth, Fire and Water: 50 years of shaping the elements. Ceramics from the Castlemaine Art Gallery & Historical Museum permanent collection.
- 2015, 2 May – 28 June: Recent Drawings: Christine Hooper
- 2015, 4 July – 23 August: "Jeremy Barrett: Survey Exhibition"
- 2015, 17 July – 31 August: ST Gill: Life on the Goldfields
- 2015, 29 August – 18 October: Inking Up | Rona Green, Deborah Klein & Clayton Tremlett
- 2015, 29 August–18 October: Contemporary Australian Silver & Metalwork Award 2015
- 2015: 31 October – 31 December: David Moore: Glimpses of Chewton
- 2015: 31 October – 31 December: Women of Gold
- 2016, 15 January – 15 April: Ben Quilty: After Afghanistan 2016
- 2016, 30 April – 30 June: Bill Henson: Landscapes
- 2016, 10 July – 15 August: Clayton Tremlett: Beard and Influence
- 2016, 21 August – 25 September: Slipstitch
- 2017, 15 January – 26 February: Michael Doolan: World Without World
- 2017, 15 January – 26 February: Minna Gilligan: Groove is in the Heart
- 2017: 19 March – 25 June: John Nixon: Experimental Painting Workshop
- 2017, 15–22 July October: Gifted: The Kohane and Moore donations of Australian studio ceramics
- 2017/18, 11 November – 5 February: Daughters of the Sun: Christian Waller and Klytie Pate
- 2019, 8 June – 1 September: 2019 Len Fox Painting Award
- 2019/20, 6 December – 1 May: Experimental Print Prize
- 2020, 27–29 November: the Way–the Water–the Walk (Reserved for the Convenience or Pleasure of the People)
- 2019/20, 11 October – 11 October: The Unquiet Landscape

=== Since 2020 ===
- 2020/21, 1 May – 9 March: Cast Recast: Damon Moon
- 2020/21, 17 May – 9 March: Janina Green in conversation with the Collection
- 2020–2022, 31 May – 1 January: From the Land: Peter Banjurljurl (Jinang), Batumbil Bararrwanga (Gumatj), Gabi Briggs (Anaiwan and Gumbangier)and Arika Waulu (Gunai and Gunditjmara), Alvin Darcy Briggs (Yorta Yorta, Taungwurrung), Blackgin (Wurundjeri), John Hunter Kerr, Nonggirrnga Marawili (Madarrpa, Yithuwa), Malalakpuy Munyarryan (Wanggurri) Baluka Maymuru (Manggalili, Belang group), Lorna Fencer Napurrula (Warlpiri), Betty Kuntiwa Pumani (Pitjantjatjara, Yankunytjatjara), Charlie Marabinyin, Ginger Riley Munduwalawala (Marra), Tashara Roberts (Dja Dja Wurrung, Yorta Yorta), works by unknown makers from the Castlemaine Art Museum, Mulkun Wirrpanda (Dhudi-Djapu, Dha-malamirr), Yumitjin Wunumurra (Dhalwangu, Narrkala)
- 2020/21, 23 November – 24 November: Cloudy – a few isolated showers: Lyndell Brown and Charles Green, Mira Gojak, Katrin Koenning, Vipoo Srivilasa, Will Ashton, Ros Bandt, W Rubery Bennett, Lina Bryans, Ernest Buckmaster, Rupert Bunny, Louis Buvelot, Murray Griffin, Hans Heysen, Frederick McCubbin, W B McInnes, Dora Meeson, Robert Vere Scott, Vipoo Srivilasa, Munuy'gnu Marika (Rirratjigna), Naminapu #2 Maymuru (Mangalili), Edwin Stocqueler, R W Sturgess, Verey & Co, Roland Wakelin.
- 2020/21, 26 December – 31 January: Kylie Banyard – Holding Ground, Orbit Gallery
- 2021, 19 March – 19 September: James Henry: 18 Families
- 2021, 19 March – 17 October, #Perempuan 2021 – Contemporary Indonesian Art
- 2021, 19 March – 2 May: Harry Nankin – The Fall, Orbit Gallery
- 2021, 4 February – 7 March: Ilka White – here now, Orbit Gallery
- 2021–2022, 19 March – 17 February: Melinda Harper: In Conversation with the Collection
- 2021, 6 May – 30 May: Minaal Lawn – 173 Forms, Orbit Gallery
- 2021, 10 June – 4 July: David Frazer – Wood Engravings, Orbit Gallery
- 2021, 8 July – 22 August: Orbit: Tashara Roberts – Your Skin My Skin, Orbit Gallery
- 2021/22, 13 November-28 February: 2021 Experimental Print Prize
- 2021–2022: SINCLAIR+GALLERY, Peter Tyndall
- 2022, 12 March – 13 June: Len Fox Painting Prize 2022
- 2022–2023 23 June – 26 February: Reflections on the Castlemaine Art Museum Collection
- 2022–2023, 5 March – 5 March: There is a certain slant of light: works from the Collection
- 2023-2024, 15 September—28 January: Experimental Print Prize
- 2023-2024, 7 September— December: Stonework curated by Jenny Long and Clive Willman
- 2024–2025, 27 September–2 March: Len Fox Painting Award, Higgins, Benefactors and Stoneman Galleries
- 2024–2025, 31 October–16 March: Moondance: Ceramics And Paintings From The Collection, Sinclair Gallery. Ceramics by Gary Bish, David Bradshaw, Colin Browne, Len Castle, Joanna Constantinidis, Lindy Cresswell, Johanna De Maine, John Dermer, Phyll Dunn, Patricia Englund, Ann Geroe, Victor Greenaway, Victoria Howlett, Peter Laycock, Col Levy, Peter Rushforth, Shigeo Shiga, Mitsuo Shoji, Peter Travis, Kirk Winter. Paintings by John Brack, Russell Drysdale, Leonard French, Robert Grieve, Roger Kemp, Godfrey Miller, Clifton Pugh and Dawn Sime. With Associate Events: 'Glaze Party with Prue Venables' (9 February 2025) and 'Moondance Minis - Moon Clay workshop' (22 February 2025)
- 2025, 22 March–31 August: Sir Leslie Thornton: Castlemaine Art Museum’s First Blockbuster. Stoneman and Benefactors Galleries. Exhibition supported by an Anonymous Donor. Associated Events: 'Thornton’s Tour de Source' Thursdays, 22 March - 31 August 2025; 'Show and Tell with Les Thornton and David Murray-Smith', 19 April 2025; 'Missjonesroses presents: Msguided' 3 May 2025; 'Light Play: A Hands-On Sculpture Workshop Inspired by Sir Leslie Thornton with Laura Jade' 21 June 2025; Dance Workshop with Heide Barrett, 3 June
- 2025, 22 March–22 Jun: Everything is Holy: Contemporary Jewellery. Curator Katie Scott (Director, Gallery Funaki, Melbourne), artists: Peter Bauhuis, David Bielander, Helen Britton, Benedikt Fischer, Karl Fritsch, Simryn Gill, Kyoko Hashimoto, Marian Hosking, Kait James, Cara Johnson, Inari Kiuru, Otto Künzli, Manon van Kouswijk, Lore Langendries, Pete McCurley, Juanita McLauchlan, Catherine Truman, Lisa Walker. Associated Events: 'Artists' Conversation', 31 May 2025
- 2025, 16 March–28 September: A Modern Turn. Higgins Gallery 16 March–28 September 2025 Ian Armstrong, Yvonne Atkinson, George Bell, Richard Beck, Barbara Brash, Dorothy Braund, Geoffrey Brown, Lina Bryans, Sybil Craig, Grace Crowley, George Duncan, Ian Fairweather, Hugh Frankland, William Frater, Douglas Green, Kate Janeba, Arthur Lindsay, Lionel Lindsay, Godfrey Miller, John Nixon, Marjorie North, Shona Nunan, Margaret Pestell, Margaret Preston, Guelda Pyke, Klytie Pate, Peter Purves-Smith, Elma Roach, Arnold Shore, Wolfgang Sievers, Clive Stephen, Constance Stokes, Alan Sumner, Eric Thake, Albert Tucker, Danila Vassilieff and Marjorie Woolcock
- 2025-2026: 2 February–6 February 2026: Framed. Whitchell Gallery Co-Curated by Rob Murdoch and Jill Barclay Artists included: Micky Allan, A.M.E. Bale, Clarice Beckett, Charles Blackman, Penleigh Boyd, Louis Buvelot, Tjikalyi Colin, Peggy Crombie, Lawence Daws, Ian Fairweather, First Nations Makers, John Ford Paterson, Leonard French, Emanuel Phillips Fox, Diena Georgetti, Ina Gregory, Harley Griffiths, Bernard Hall, Polly Hurry, Roger Kemp, Sydney Long, Frederick McCubbin, Max Meldrum, Mortimer Menpes, Godfrey Miller, Girolamo Nerli, Tomislav Nikolic, Margaret Preston, Norma Redpath, Lloyd Rees, Tom Roberts, Unknown makers from Groote Eylandt, Charles Summers, Jeffrey Smart, May Vale, Roland Wakelin, Jake Walker, Doug Watson, Percy Watson, Fred Williams, Walter Withers. Supported by the Friends of Castlemaine Art Museum (FOCAM), Chapman & Bailey and Jarman Framing, Conservation Department, National Gallery of Victoria
- 2025–2026: 9 October 26 March: Summer Fields, including Rick Amor, Murray Griffin, Gabrielle Martin, Geoff O'Loughlin, Minnie Mabarjuba, Dawn Pascoe, John Perceval, Tom Roberts, Arnold Shore, Wendy Stavrianos, Liz Sullivan, Fred Willliams, Mulkun Wirrpanda and unknown makers.
- 2025–2026, 8 November–1 March: 2025 Experimental Print Prize
- 2026, 7 February–26 April: Where Stone Meets Sky: Brodie Ellis, Alvin Darcy
- 2026, 12 March–19 July: They Worketh Willingly With Their Hands
- 2026, 12 March–19 July: Groundswell, with Arkeria Armstrong, Aunty Kerri Douglas, Melinda Harper, Judith van Heeren, Kate Just, Ruth O'Leary, Anna Read, Anna Schwann and lIka White
- 2026, 2 April–1 June: Altered States. Roz Avent solo
- 2026, 30 April–26 July: Ivor Cantrill: Paintings and Ceramics
- 2026, 7 July–26 October: The Power of Delicacy: Micky Allan
- 2026, 22 August to 29 November: BIYAL, celebrating the Guildford Biyal (Red gum) through sculpture, installation, and cultural expression. Curated by Uncle Rick Nelson, Kerry Douglas, Hape Kiddle, Dan Mitchell and the Guildford Biyal Project Team.
- 2026, 30 July–8 November: Rhett d'Costa A Crate Full of Mangoes
- 2026–2027, 29 August–14 March: My Brilliant Career. Curated by Jenny Long
- 2026–2027, 14 November–31 January: Judith van Heeren, Moon Obscure
