= Andrea Daly =

New Zealand jeweller and arts teacher (born 1965)

- Born: Andrea Daly; 1965; Wellington, New Zealand
- Education: Sydney College of the Arts, Bachelor of Visual Arts, 1987. Postgraduate Diploma (contemporary jewellery) 1988. Auckland University, Master of Philosophy (Art History), 1998.
- Known for: Jewellery, teaching

Andrea Daly (born 1965) is a New Zealand jeweller and arts teacher. She studied at Sydney College of the Arts, completing a Bachelor of Visual Arts in 1987. The following year, she gained a Post Graduate Diploma in Visual Arts majoring in contemporary jewellery. In 1998, she completed a master's degree in Philosophy majoring in Art History at Auckland University

== Early life ==
Daly was born in Wellington in 1965. She grew up partly in the Hokianga, one of the first areas of European settlement in New Zealand and the birthplace of Roman Catholicism in the country. While no longer a practising Catholic, curator Philip Clarke noted in 2010 that 'Catholic knowledge and sensibilities remain deeply ingrained and these sensibilities continue to inform and be celebrated within her jewellery practice'.

== Education ==
Art historians Damian Skinner and Kevin Murray give Daly as an example of one of the early jewellers to emerge from new tertiary courses in their 2014 history of contemporary jewellery in New Zealand and Australia. She studied at Sydney College of the Arts, completing a Bachelor of Visual Arts in 1987. The following year, she gained a Post Graduate Diploma in Visual Arts majoring in contemporary jewellery. In 1998, she completed a master's degree in Philosophy majoring in Art History at Auckland University.

== Career ==
She became a partner in Fingers Contemporary Jewellery in 1991, and taught at the Manukau Institute of Technology until 2004.

According to Helen Schamroth, Daly "aims for integrity in her jewellery by seeking to make social commentary based on her own experience of a Catholic upbringing, and wants the ideas to ring true because they are more than superficial observations...Daly is interested in the function of jewellery as a signifier of the ways in which the body is understood and positioned in society." Her early work included icons of the Madonna, presented in brooches and pendants, in materials from gold-leaf to paper collages. She creates beaded and embroidered surfaces recalling religious garments and church adornments, and has used angel, heart, skull and wing motifs. She has also used Catholic ex votos in brooches.

Daly has participated widely in group exhibitions, and held various solo shows. Her work was included in Open Heart (1993–94), Same but Different (1996) and Grammar: Subjects and Objects (2001), respectively the first, second and fourth biennial exhibitions of contemporary New Zealand jewellery organised by The Dowse Art Museum and Talking to me: Collecting and making at Objectspace in 2010. Her work was also featured in Wunderrūma: New Zealand Jewellery, a touring exhibition of contemporary New Zealand jewellery curated by Warwick Freeman and Karl Fritsch and shown in 2014 at Galerie Handwerk in Munich and The Dowse Art Museum.

== Further sources ==
- The Dowse Art Museum; Eléna Gee, 'Open Heart: Contemporary New Zealand Jewellery', November 1993.
- The Dowse Art Museum; Kobi Bosshard, The Second New Zealand Jewellery Biennial: Same But Different, 1996.
- Deborah Crowe; The Dowse Art Museum, 4th New Zealand Jewellery Biennale: Grammar: Subjects and Objects, 2001.
