= Warwick Freeman =

New Zealand jeweller (born 1953)

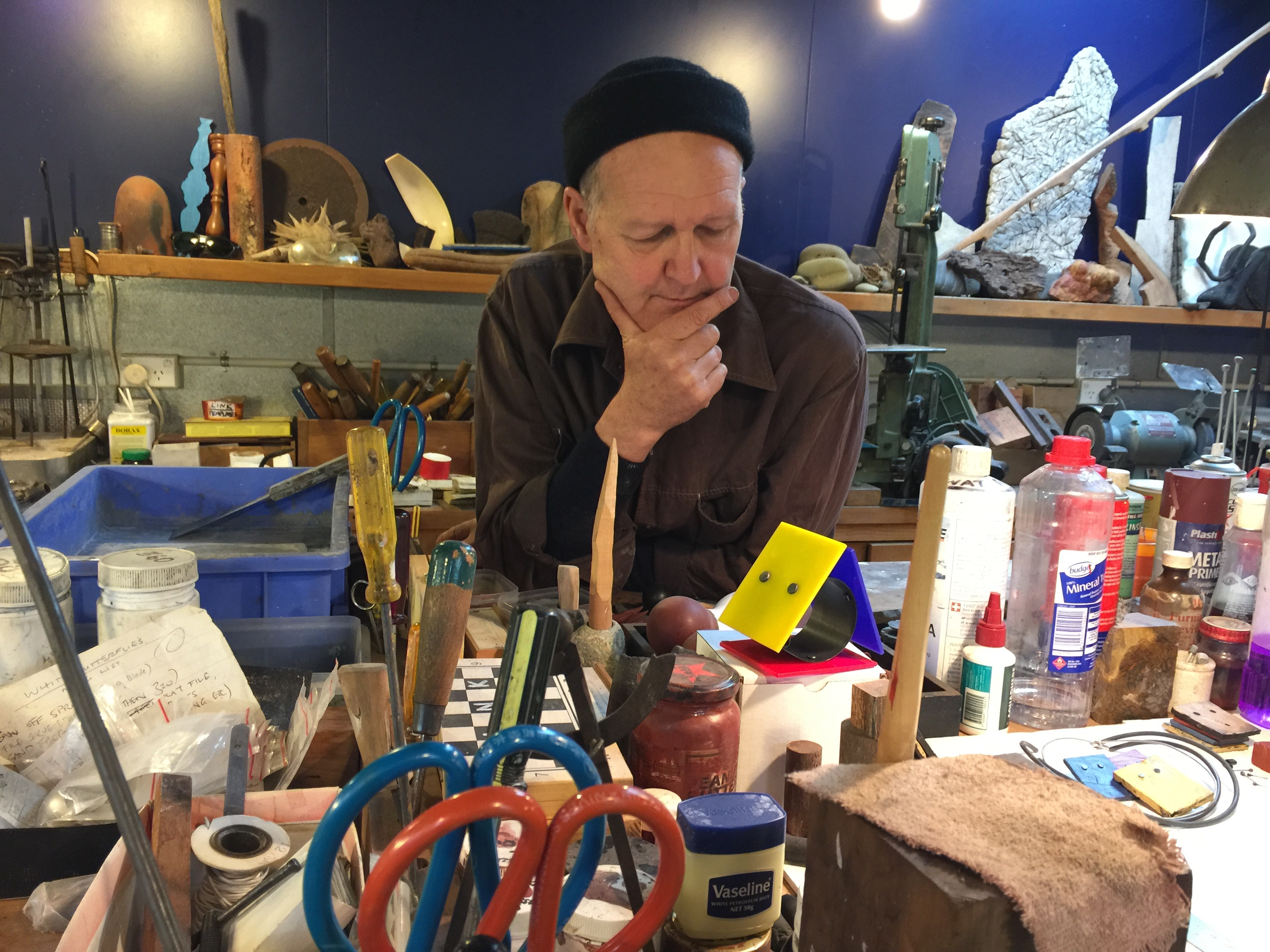
- Warwick Freeman in his Auckland studio, 2015
- Born: Warwick Stephen Freeman; 5 January 1953 (age 73); Nelson, New Zealand
- Known for: Jewellery, metalwork

Warwick Stephen Freeman (born 5 January 1953) is a New Zealand jeweller.

== Biography ==
Freeman was born in Nelson in 1953, and was educated at Nelson College from 1966 to 1970. He began making jewellery with Peter Woods in Perth in 1972. He returned to New Zealand the following year and established a workshop in Nelson before moving to Auckland in 1975. In 1977 he worked with Daniel Clasby, and with Jens Hansen in 1978. Freeman was a member of the Auckland-based jewellery co-operative Fingers between 1978 and 2003.

In the early eighties, Freeman was a prominent member of a group of jewellers who began exploring the use of local materials in contemporary jewellery. Their work reflected a changing New Zealand cultural and political environment. “We were caught up in a historical moment triggered by the new Labour government,” Freeman recalls. “They declared us Nuclear Free, and started developing a foreign policy that was about living in the South Pacific as opposed to being an adjunct of Europe. Our work got swept up in it and adopted by locals as ‘emblematic’ in the way jewellery can.”

Freeman was one of twelve jewellers selected for the landmark 1988 Bone Stone Shell exhibition, developed by New Zealand's Craft Council for the Ministry of Foreign Affairs and shown in Asia, Australia and New Zealand. In 2002, he received an Arts Foundation of New Zealand Laureate Award. In the same year he was named 2002 Laureate by the Françoise van den Bosch Foundation, based at the Stedelijk Museum Amsterdam.

Freeman was the founding chair of Auckland contemporary craft and design gallery Objectspace, and in 2013 became a Governor of the New Zealand Arts Foundation. In 2013 he was also the 'featured master' at the German contemporary jewellery festival Schmuck.

In 2018 he designed a special brass pin which was released to coincide with a light show at St David's Memorial Church in Khyber Pass Road, Auckland for the Anzac Day commemorations; the pins were sold to raise funds for the preservation of the church.

== Curatorial projects ==
James Mack called Freeman "one of the guiding lights" behind the 1981 Paua Dreams exhibition, which was instrumental in elevating the status of paua shell from its association with the tourist market to a precious material in contemporary New Zealand jewellery.

In 1983, Freeman and fellow jeweller Alan Preston were asked by Mack, then director of The Dowse Art Museum, to select items from the Auckland Museum's collection for a 1984 exhibition at The Dowse titled Pacific Adornment.

In 2011 Freeman collaborated with Octavia Cook on the exhibition Eyecatch at Objectspace gallery in Auckland. The first photographic exhibition held at Objectspace, the show looked at the relationship between jewellery and photography.

In 2014 Freeman co-curated Wunderrūma: New Zealand Jewellery with Karl Fritsch, a touring exhibition of New Zealand jewellery that showed at Galerie Handwerk in Munich as part of the Schmuck festival, at The Dowse Art Museum, and at the Auckland Art Gallery in 2015 .

== Collections ==
His works are held various New Zealand and international collections, including at the Museum of New Zealand Te Papa Tongarewa, the Auckland War Memorial Museum, the Powerhouse Museum, the Neue Pinakothek, The Dowse Art Museum, the National Gallery of Australia, the Stedelijk Museum Amsterdam and the Museum of Fine Arts, Houston.

== Selected solo exhibitions ==
- Owner’s Manual: Jewellery by Warwick Freeman, various New Zealand locations (1995)
- Given: Jewellery by Warwick Freeman, Tropenmuseum, Amsterdam (2004) and various New Zealand locations (2005–2007)
- It's Black or White, Starkwhite, Auckland (2007)
- Shadowboard, Bowen Galleries, Wellington (2008)
- Colour Slide, Bowen Galleries, Wellington (2010)
- Jewellery by Warwick Freeman, The National, Christchurch (2013)
- The Family Jewels, Objectspace (2015), The Dowse Art Museum (2016), MTG Hawke's Bay (2016)
- Prime, Gallery Funaki, Melbourne (2015)
- Warwick Freeman, The National, Christchurch (2015)

== Selected group exhibitions ==
- Bone Stone Shell, various international locations (1988)
- Open Heart, First New Zealand Jewellery Biennial, The Dowse Art Museum (1993–1994)
- Same but Different, Second New Zealand Jewellery Biennial, The Dowse Art Museum, Auckland Museum and Otago Museum(1996)
- Grammar: Subjects & Objects, Fourth New Zealand Jewellery Biennial, The Dowse Art Museum (2001)
- Ornament as Art: Avant-Garde Jewelry from the Helen Williams Drutt Collection, Museum of Fine Arts, Houston and Renwick Gallery, Washington (2008)
- Collecting Contemporary, Museum of New Zealand Te Papa Tongarewa (2011–2012)
- Bone Stone Shell: 25 years on, Museum of New Zealand Te Papa Tongarewa (2013–2014)
- Wunderrūma: New Zealand Jewellery, Galerie Handwerk, Munich (2014), The Dowse Art Museum, Lower Hutt (2014), Auckland Art Gallery 2015
- The Bold and The Beautiful, The Dowse Art Museum (2015)

== Further information ==
=== Interviews ===
- Interview with Warwick Freeman. Museum of New Zealand Te Papa Tongarewa. 10 January 2012.
- Warwick Freeman. Cultural Icons: conversations with iconic people.
- Conversations about contemporary jewellery: Warwick Freeman. Fran Allison / Manukau Institute of Technology.
- Interview with Karl Fritsch and Warwick Freeman, Saturday Mornings with Kim Hill, Radio New Zealand National, June 2014
- Interview with Warwick Freeman and Karl Fritsch on the exhibition Wunderruma, Auckland Art Gallery Toi o Tamaki, 2015
- Mackenzie Paton Interview with Warwick Freeman, The Dowse Art Museum, March 2016.

=== Publications and articles on Freeman's work ===
- James Mack, Warwick Freeman: Maker of Things, New Zealand Crafts, Autumn 1985.
- Julie Ewington, Owner's manual / jewellery by Warwick Freeman, Auckland: Starform, 1995.
- Damian Skinner, Given: jewellery by Warwick Freeman, Auckland: Starform, 2004. ISBN 0476004276
- Andrea Stevens, Indesign issue 48 pg 199, New Zealand contemporary jeweller, Warwick Freeman, on making meaning from ‘found’ objects, Sydney: Indesign Media, 2011.

=== Publications on contemporary jewellery ===
- New Zealand Ministry of Foreign Affairs and Trade, Bone Stone Shell: New Jewellery New Zealand, Lower Hutt: The Dowse Art Museum, 1988. ISBN 0477037097.
- Eléna Gee, 'Open Heart: Contemporary New Zealand Jewellery', Lower Hutt: The Dowse Art Museum, 1993.
- Kobi Bosshard, The Second New Zealand Jewellery Biennial: Same But Different, Lower Hutt: The Dowse Art Museum, 1996.
- Deborah Crowe, 4th New Zealand Jewellery Biennale: Grammar: Subjects and Objects, 2001.
- Damian Skinner Pocket Guide to New Zealand Jewelry, San Francisco: Velvet Da Vinci Gallery, and The Society of Arts and Craft, Boston, MA, 2010. ISBN 9780615340104
- Damian Skinner and Kevin Murray, 'Place and adornment : a history of contemporary jewellery in Australia and New Zealand', Honolulu : University of Hawaiʻi Press, 2014. ISBN 9781454702771
