= Pauline Bern =

New Zealand jeweller (born 1952)

- Born: Pauline Bern; 1952 (age 72–73); Auckland, New Zealand
- Known for: Jewellery

Pauline Bern (born 1952) is a New Zealand jeweller.

== Early life ==
Bern was born in Auckland in 1952.

== Career ==
Bern is a self-taught jeweller who began making jewellery while living in the United States in the 1970s. She has exhibited consistently in New Zealand since the mid 1980s. In 1988 she became a lecturer in craft design at Carrington Polytechnic in Auckland (now Unitec Institute of Technology). In 1992 Bern became Head of Jewellery, and continued to teach at Unitec until 2012, working with a number of students who went on to become significant artists in their own right, including Areta Wilkinson, Octavia Cook, Jane Dodd and Joe Sheehan.

== Work ==
Bern's work often references domestic activity. A necklace of silver strands woven to resemble small steel wool pot scrubbers won her the Thomas Foundation Gold Award in 2000, and the piece she created as a result, made from 80 metres of 18ct gold wire, is in the collection of the Dowse Art Museum.

== Recognition ==
In 2003 Bern was awarded the Creative New Zealand Craft/Object Art Residency, giving her the opportunity to spend two months working with other jewellers at the Gray Street Workshop in Adelaide. Major exhibitions include 'Strain, Grate, Whisk, Scrub' which toured New Zealand galleries in 2000–01 and 'Colonial Goose' at Objectspace, Auckland, in 2011.
