= Lisa Walker =

New Zealand jeweler (born 1967)

Lisa Walker ONZM
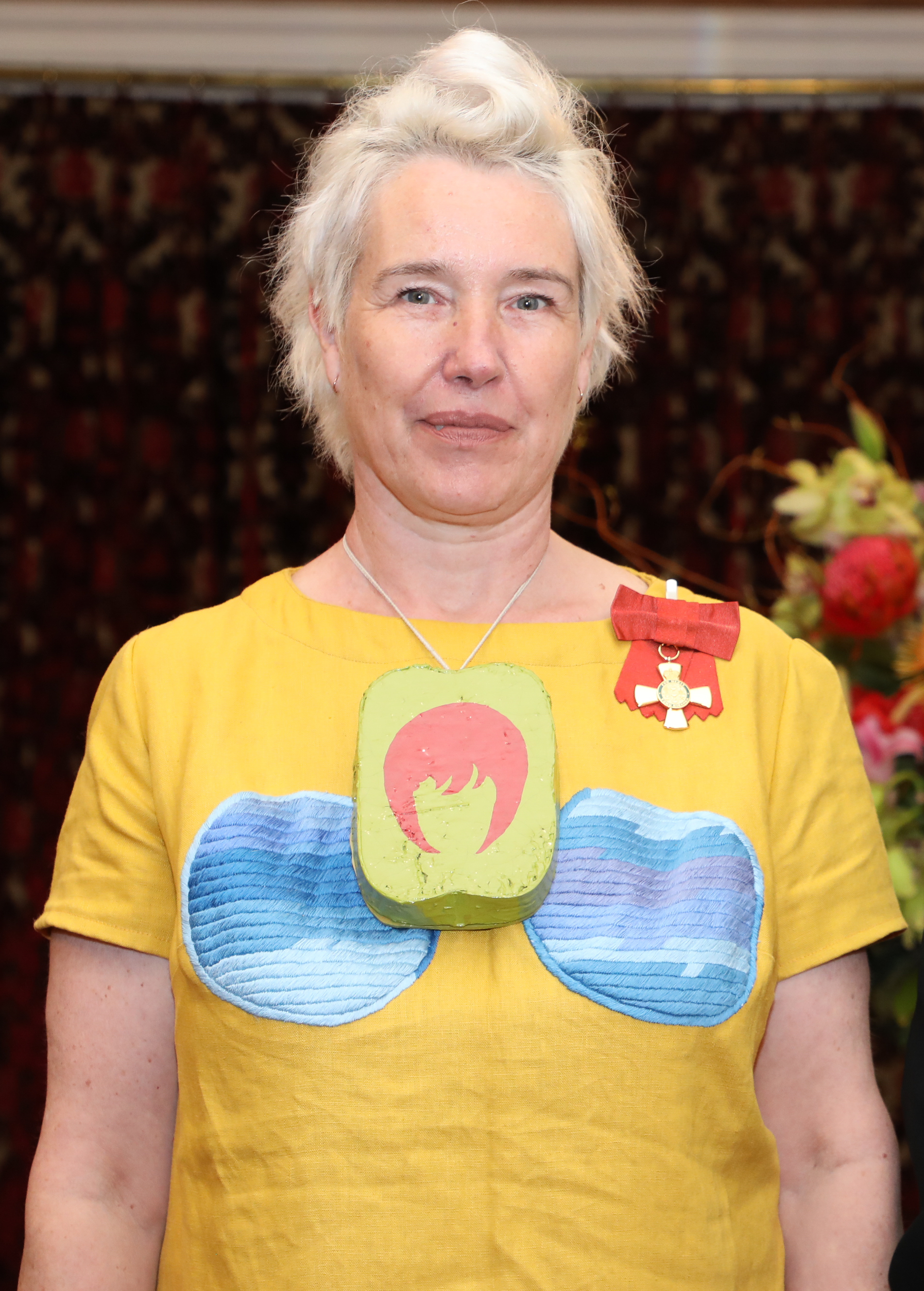
- Walker in 2022
- Born: 1967 (age 58–59); Wellington, New Zealand
- Known for: Jewellery
- Spouse: Karl Fritsch
- Website: www.lisawalker.de

Lisa Walker ONZM (born 1967) is a contemporary New Zealand jeweller.

== Education and training in New Zealand ==
Born in Wellington in 1967, Walker graduated from Otago Polytechnic, Dunedin, in 1988 with a Certificate in Craft Design. In Dunedin her tutors included German-trained jeweller Georg Beer and Swiss-trained jeweller Kobi Bosshard. After completing her studies, Walker moved to Auckland, where along with Areta Wilkinson, Anna Wallis and Helen O'Connor she established the jewellery workshop Workshop 6.

== Training and work in Germany ==
In 1995 Walker moved to Germany, and from 1995 to 2001 studied under jeweller Otto Kunzli at the 'Klasse Kunzli' at the Akademie der Bildenden Künste München in Munich. In Munich, Walker established a successful international career as a jeweller, including being recognised with the 2010 Françoise van den Bosch Award for "work of an outstanding quality that influences and appeals to younger generations of artists internationally". In 2009 Walker returned to Wellington with her partner, jeweller Karl Fritsch.

== Work ==
Walker's work "questions conventional concepts about jewellery's beauty and wearability" by using second-hand items and materials found in hobby stores, as well as non-traditional techniques such as glueing materials together. Materials she has incorporated into her jewellery include rubber bands, wood dowelling, sequins, tape, leather, paua shell veneer, stuffed toys, artificial grass, freshwater pearls, steel, lacquer and fabric. Art historian Dionea Rocha-Watt observes that Walker "may have abandoned some traditional skills but is still referencing the history of jewellery, with a great sense of colour and composition."

In a review of a 2015 exhibition of Walker's work, art critic Warren Feeney wrote:

Over the past 20 years, Walker has played a critical role in the development of contemporary jewellery in New Zealand and internationally, making work that confronts familiar perceptions about what a precious object might be. This ability to pose question after question about the possibilities of her work is apparent, not only in her comments about individual pieces, but equally in the range of materials, subjects, processes and scale of her jewellery.

In 2015 Walker joined the photo-sharing website Instagram. She has noted that the site provides a "huge hunting ground" for inspiration, and that currently she draws more from imagery she finds online than on objects in the physical world for starting points for her own making.

She has also collaborated with performance art/music group Chicks on Speed, initially when she met the participants while studying in Germany, but also in shows in New Zealand, contributing pieces from unused costumes, or works specifically created for performances.

A recent work by Walker made of pieces of pounamu was included as an illustration in New Zealand historian Barbara Brookes' A History of New Zealand Women as an example of how contemporary New Zealand jewellery reflects a sense of place.

== Process ==
In a 2008 interview Walker said:

I work on several ideas and pieces at once, and don't prepare for exhibitions − I show where I'm at, at that particular time. Sometimes I work with an idea, sometimes with a certain material. Sometimes an influence repeats itself in pieces over a few years, sometimes one piece is sufficient.

Contemporary craft writer Andre Gali suggests that since her time as a student in Germany, Walker has engaged with the concept of 'deskilling':

With her background as a goldsmith, we can imagine that Walker could easily engage with the values and aesthetics of “doing something well.” However, deskilling and the use of readymades shift the value of the work away from craftsmanship—even though that is important as well—toward an artistic sensibility.

Art historian Maya Love has commented on Walker's documentary process, stating that the artist "photograph[s] each piece against a white or grey background. She admits to hoarding materials now inclusive of digital imagery saved on social media or an Etsy wishlist."

== Collections and exhibitions ==
Her work is held in a number of public collections, including the Auckland War Memorial Museum, the Museum of New Zealand Te Papa Tongarewa, The Dowse Art Museum and the National Gallery of Victoria, Melbourne.

Significant exhibitions include:

- 2009 Her Last Show Made in Munich, Nurnberg Museum of Art and Design, Germany
- 2010 Lisa Walker – Unwearable at Objectspace
- 2011 Wearable at the Cobra Museum of Modern Art, Netherlands
- 2013 Touch Me Baby I'm Bodycentric, A Multimodalplosion! with Chicks on Speed at City Gallery Wellington
- 2015 Love and Technique (with Karl Fritsch), Rosemarie Jäger Gallery, Hochheim
- 2015 Anna's Best Friend is Russian Bob's Mother, The National, Christchurch
- 2015 One Week Exhibition, Platina, Stockholm
- 2016 The End, Galerie Biro, Munich; 0 + 0 = 0, Christchurch Art Gallery
- 2018 Lisa Walker: I want to go to my bedroom but I can’t be bothered, a survey exhibition of Walker's work, part of the suite of exhibitions marking the opening of the Museum of New Zealand Te Papa Tongarewa refurbished art galleries.

A guide titled A Children's Guide to the Jewellery (and Art) of Lisa Walker, co-authored by Megan and Isaac du Toit, was created for the 2018 Te Papa Tongarewa exhibition I want to go to my bedroom but I can’t be bothered.

In her 2021 iteration of the same exhibition at Te Uru Waitakere Contemporary Gallery, Lisa Walker: She wants to go to her bedroom but she can't be bothered, "over 250 pieces [were] carefully displayed over gallery spaces that each loosely encompass[ed] a significant chapter in her career." Like the Te Papa Tongarewa exhibition, it was an ambitious retrospective looking at the artist’s 30-year career as a pioneer of contemporary jewellery.

Walker's work was included in Collecting Contemporary (2011–2012)and Bone Stone Shell (2013–2014) at the Museum of New Zealand Te Papa Tongarewa. She was also included in Wunderrūma: New Zealand Jewellery, a touring exhibition that showed at Galerie Handwerk in Munich, The Dowse Art Museum and Auckland Art Gallery.

For the Obstinate Object exhibition of contemporary sculpture at City Gallery Wellington in 2012 Walker contributed a site-specific piece called BROOCH, where a brooch fastening and steel safety chain were affixed to a gallery ceiling, suggested a visitor could 'wear' the building.

In 2015 Walker presented a guest lecture on her past and current work at Nordiska museet, Stockholm, co-organised by Konsthantverkscentrum, the Röhsska Museum for Arts, Crafts, Design and Fashion, and The School of Design and Crafts under the Iaspis programme.

== Recognition ==
- 2007 Förderpreis der Stadt München (City of Munich scholarship)
- 2009 Francoise van den Bosch Award
- 2015 Laureate Award, Arts Foundation of New Zealand.

In the 2022 Queen's Birthday and Platinum Jubilee Honours, Walker was appointed an Officer of the New Zealand Order of Merit, for services as a jeweller.
