= Fingers (gallery) =

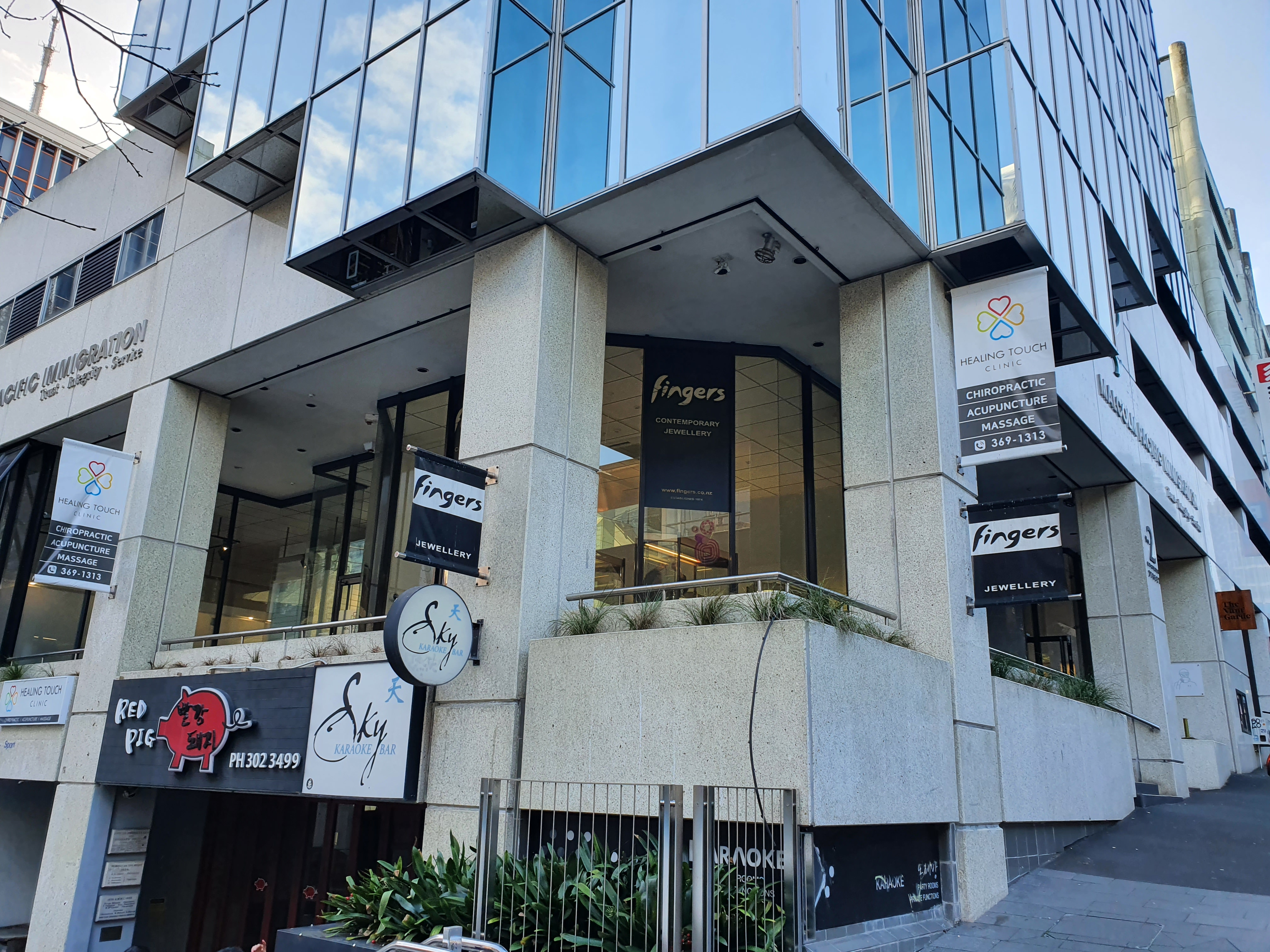

General information
- Type: Art Gallery
- Location: 2 Kitchener Street, Auckland City Centre, New Zealand
- Coordinates: 36.8507°S 174.7661°E

Website
- fingers.co.nz

Fingers is a contemporary jewellery gallery in Auckland, New Zealand. Fingers shows and sells the work primarily of New Zealand jewellers, but also of international jewellers, mostly from Australia and Europe.

Established in 1974, Fingers is the longest running institution of its type in New Zealand, and one of the longest running contemporary jewellery spaces in the world. It began when jeweller Alan Preston, after a stint as a Guest Artist at Brown's Mill Market, New Zealand's first craft co-operative, approached jewellers Ruth Baird, Roy Mason, Margaret Philips and Michael Ayling to open a jewellery shop on Auckland's Lorne Street. The name 'Fingers' was chosen because all the jewellers were at the time making rings.

The aim of the cooperative was to "sell directly to the public, to exchange techniques and ideas, and to provide a focal point for creative jewellery in New Zealand." Each member of the cooperative spent one day of the week minding the shop, and the rest working independently on their jewellery. In its early years, Fingers had a strong focus on silversmithing and the group also set up a silversmithing school called Lapis Lazuli.

Important early exhibitions included 'Guaranteed Trash' (1978), which responded to the punk aesthetic, the Bone show (1981), where 24 jewellers contributed pieces made from bone, and 'Paua Dreams' (1981) featuring the six Fingers members and eight invited jewellers, with the aim of elevating paua shell back up from its use in mass-produced souvenirs for the tourist trade. Much of the work in the Bone exhibition was lost in a robbery on 29 April 1981.

By the mid-1980s New Zealand galleries and museums were starting to buy pieces of jewellery from Fingers. A 1984 article in the New Zealand Listener Jacqueline Amoamo noted:

"In a review of 'Paua Dreams' I suggested it was time that museums and art galleries started collections of New Zealand craft jewellery. Someone at the Auckland Museum must have taken the hint because within a few minutes of the opening of the latest Fingers exhibition 'Souvenirs' a representative had bought a delicate paua necklace-and-earrings set by Ruth Baird and a spectacular silver pendant inlaid with paua and enamel by guest exhibitor Elena Gee - at $600 the most expensive piece on show. The Dowse Art Museum in Lower Hutt is one public gallery that does have a permanent collection of jewellery, including work by Fingers people and Auckland stone carver John Edgar."

Fingers moved to its current premises on Kitchener Street in 1987, opposite the Auckland Art Gallery. Freestanding glass-sided cabinets and a counter designed by Humphrey Ikin suggested "an expanded ambition as a gallery rather than a shop". In a move to reassure jewellers and customers that it remained committed to accessibly-priced jewellery, Fingers staged the group exhibition '$100 Under' in 1988. In 1991 craft commentator Helen Schamroth wrote, "If there is one underlying common philosophy of the work at Fingers it is an original, innovative approach to design solutions, a contemporary response to customer interests, and meeting their aesthetic and emotional needs."

Fingers celebrated its 40th anniversary in November 2014 with an exhibition at Objectspace gallery in Auckland and a book by Damian Skinner and Finn McCahon-Jones. Three of the original five founders - Alan Preston, Ruth Baird and Roy Mason - are still members.

== List of Fingers members ==
- Alan Preston (1974 -)
- Ruth Baird (1974 -)
- Roy Mason (1974 -)
- Margaret Philips (1974-1976)
- Michael Ayling (1974-1976)
- Michael Guy (1975 - 1982)
- Alex (Erena) McNeill (1976 - 1977)
- Daniel Clasby (1976 - 1979; 1984 - 1985)
- Chaia Fein (1977 - 1979)
- Michael Couper (1977 -)
- Warwick Freeman (1978 - 2003)
- Nick Charlton (1984 - 1988; 1990 - 1993)
- Eléna Gee (1984 - 1991)
- Paul Annear (1991 - 1996)
- Andrea Daly (1991 - )

== Further sources ==
- Moyra Elliott, 'Talking Shop: Fingers', Object Magazine, issue 46, 2005
- "Alan Preston interview on 'Nine to Noon'". Radio New Zealand National. 23 December 2014.
- The Dowse Art Museum; Eléna Gee, 'Open Heart: Contemporary New Zealand Jewellery', November 1993
- Objectspace, Fingers: Jewellery for Aotearoa New Zealand: 40 Years of fingers Jewellery Gallery, 2014, ISBN 978-0-9922577-6-7
- Fingers, New Zealand Crafts 7, Sept-Oct 1983
