= Annear =

Annear is a surname. Notable people with the surname include:

- John Annear (born 1961), Australian rules footballer
- John Annear (politician) (1842–1910), Australian politician
- Paul Annear (1947–2016), New Zealand jeweller

== See also ==
- Harold Desbrowe-Annear (1865–1933), Australian architect
- Annar, figure in Norse Mythology
