= Gavin Hitchings =

New Zealand jeweller

Gavin John Hitchings (26 December 1937 – 21 August 2018) was a jeweller who lived in New Zealand.

== Early life ==
Born in Woolwich, London, Hitchings grew up in Wales and moved to New Zealand in 1965 where he worked as an entomologist in the Department of Scientific and Industrial Research (New Zealand).

== Jewellery ==
In 1968 Hitchings trained in the workshop of Jens Hoyer Hansen, becoming a working partner in the business. In the mid 1970s founded his own workshop and along with Hoyer-Hansen was a foundation tutor at Nelson Polytechnic Institute. He taught at Nelson Polytechnic between 1986 and 1995 and was the recipient of two QEII Arts Council grants. As Helen Schamroth writes, 'His works sometimes seem large as jewellery yet are miniatures in a sculptural context'.

== Recognition ==
In 1977 he won was named Jeweller of the Year by the Jewellers Association of New Zealand. Hitchings is an artist member of the New Zealand Academy of Fine Arts, and has served on the advisory board for the former New Zealand Crafts Council and to the School of Visual Arts, N.M.I.T.

== Selected exhibitions ==
Hitchings has exhibited extensively since 1974.

- 2009 Re:Fine Suter Art Gallery Nelson
- 2008 Rima-Five Catchment Gallery, Nelson
- 2007 Further Dimensions Form Gallery, Nelson
- 1997 Boulder Sculpture Miyazu City Japan
