= Nanette Cameron =

New Zealand interior designer and educator

- Born: 27 September 1927
- Died: 13 April 2023; Freemans Bay
- Children: Kirsty Cameron
- Awards: Queen's Service Medal

Nanette Helen Cameron née Sumpter QSM (27 September 1927 – 13 April 2023) was a New Zealand interior designer, and educator. Cameron taught New Zealand's first course in interior design, and opened the Nanette Cameron School of Interior Design in 1975, and co-founded the Pakuranga Arts Society. In 2004 Cameron was awarded a Queen's Service Medal for community service.

== Career ==
Cameron attended the University of Otago where she gained a degree in home economics. She started working as an interior designer in Auckland, and in 1967 started teaching interior design in night classes at Tamaki College. She also started writing on interior design, and opened the Nanette Cameron School of Interior Design in 1975. Cameron taught New Zealand's first course in interior design. Her approach to design teaching covered history and principles of good design alongside independence, with art writer Philip Clarke saying "Nanette’s approach to design is one that integrates an interest and awareness of contemporary art and architecture, environmental and social issues with individual and social development."

With Iris Fisher, Cameron founded the Pakuranga Arts Society, later renamed Te Tuhi. She was also a founding member of the Designers Institute of New Zealand.

In 2013 an exhibition on Cameron and her life was shown at Objectspace in Auckland, and an accompanying book Nanette Cameron: Interior Design Legend was published.

Cameron retired from teaching in 2016, at the age of 88. She died at home in Auckland at the age of 95 on 13 April 2023. Her funeral was held at St Joseph's Church in Grey Lynn, where "her casket painted Yves Klein Blue and bedecked with a swathe of bird of paradise flowers". Cameron's daughter is costume and production designer Kirsty Cameron.

== Honours and awards ==
In the 2004 Queen's Birthday Honours Cameron was awarded a Queen's Service Medal for community service. She was made an honorary member of the Designers Institute of New Zealand. In 2019 Cameron was awarded the Lifetime Achievement Award at the 2019 Interior Awards. The citation called her "a true icon of New Zealand design", noting that "Cameron’s prowess as an interior designer and educator has seen her work take on something of a legendary status, as if mythologised under the sheer weight of her enduring influence. Since she began her career in the 1950s, Cameron has inspired and helped define New Zealand’s interior design via both her school and her renowned body of work."
