= Bone Stone Shell =

Jewellery exhibition

Bone Stone Shell: New Jewellery New Zealand was a 1988 exhibition of contemporary New Zealand jewellery and carving which toured internationally. The exhibition is seen as capturing a moment when New Zealand jewelers started looked less at European traditions and precious materials and more at Pacific traditions and natural materials.

== Development ==
The exhibition was developed by New Zealand's Craft Council (later absorbed into Creative New Zealand) for the Ministry of Foreign Affairs to "show overseas audiences the new and important direction of New Zealand jewellery". It was shown in Asia, Australia and New Zealand over a five-year period. It was curated by artist John Edgar with a selection panel consisting of Edith Ryan, craft programme manager, QE II Arts Council; James Mack, director of the Dowse Art Museum; and jeweller Kobi Bosshard.

Twelve artists were eventually selected and they made over 40 new pieces of work in total from bone, stone and shell. Artists were given a brief around materials:

The materials, Bone (ivory, beef, whale), Stone (argillite, greywacke, nephrite, jade) and Shell will predominate, although not exclusively. Other complementary materials will be silver, wood, plastic, fibre etc.

Bone Stone Shell was designed to show new way of thinking about materials and place in New Zealand contemporary jewellery. It showed New Zealand artists taking inspiration from the history of Maori and Pacific adornment, rather than just Western traditions, and the use of local materials like paua shell and pounamu, rather than the precious stones and metal of European jewellery. As curator John Edgar wrote in the exhibition catalogue:

This exhibition is about awareness – of our heritage of Western civilisation and our cultural environment in the South Pacific; of our place in the twentieth century and the values necessary to survive the nuclear age; of the delicate fragility of our ecology and our relationship to the natural materials and the non-renewable resources of our region; of the celebration of the forces that formed these materials and the life within them; and, of the ability to communicate in objects of beauty, spirit and power.

== Legacy ==
After the conclusion of the touring show, the pieces were acquired by the Friends of Te Papa for the Museum of New Zealand Te Papa Tongarewa. In 2013/14 Te Papa restaged the works from Bone Stone Shell alongside more recent pieces of contemporary jewellery and pieces from its Maori and Pacific collections.

== Artists included in Bone Stone Shell ==
- Paul Annear
- Hamish Campbell
- Michael Couper
- John Edgar (sculptor)
- Warwick Freeman
- Eléna Gee
- Dave Hegglun
- Paul Mason
- Roy Mason
- Alan Preston
- Jenny Pattrick
- Inia Taylor
