= Paul Annear =

New Zealand jeweller (1947–2016)

Paul Geoffrey Annear (17 October 1947 in Wellington, New Zealand – 24 April 2016 in Phnom Penh) was a New Zealand contemporary jeweller.

Annear was born to a Pākehā family, but was fascinated by carved adzes, tiki, and mere from an early age. He left home in 1966 and began making jewellery. He completed a Bachelor of Arts in anthropology and psychology in 1973, but later dismissed his degree as 'unimportant'. As a jeweller, Annear was self-taught, like many of his contemporaries.

Annear's early work was made in silver, and he also made paintings early in his career. In 1975 Annear was given a copy of Theo Schoon's book Jade Country, and was fascinated by the material pounamu or New Zealand greenstone. In the early 1980s the work of John Edgar and Donn Salt further piqued his interest in pounamu, and he recalled the impact of a 1983 John Edgar show in Ponsonby where he was exposed to simple, beautiful jade carving. On a 1986 trip to the West Coast of New Zealand's South Island, Annear met the carvers Peter Hughson, Cliff Dalziel, Ian Boustridge, and Ross Crump, and gathered his first pieces of pounamu, a material that became very important for him. He set up a carving studio in Auckland in a corrugated-iron shed with two washing-machine engines powering a grinder and saw, and began carving adzes.

In a 1988 article for Craft New Zealand craft historian Helen Schamroth discussed Annear's work, with particular reference to his 'bangles'. She wrote:

Not all of them are necessarily wearable – rather they function as visual objects. 'Bangle' seems an easily recognisable descriptive label he uses to describe a series of circular and cylindrical forms. It seems of little consequence that the aperture might be too tight to fit over a hand, or that a hollow cylindrical shape would imprison the arm. By simplifying the imagery Paul has in fact driven the function out, leaving a form, a shape to be admired, sculpture rather than jewellery.

Annear was one of twelve artists selected for the 1988 Bone Stone Shell exhibition, a touring exhibition developed by the New Zealand Craft Council for the Ministry of Foreign Affairs to "show overseas audiences the new and important direction of New Zealand jewellery". The works Annear made for Bone Stone Shell were all made of pounamu: he noted in the exhibition catalogue that 'Jade is the material that dominates my work at this time'. He described his work from this time as being inspired by an ‘imagined neolithic culture’ rather than specifically Māori forms: the strong geometric shapes of the pieces are derived from arrowheads, adzes and other implements.

In 1991 Annear was awarded a Winston Churchill Memorial Fellowship to study ancient jade carvings in Asia, Europe, and North America. From 1991 to 1996 he was a member of the contemporary jewellers collective, the Fingers group. His work was included in the 1993 survey of New Zealand jewellery Open Heart, curated by Elena Gee for The Dowse Art Museum. He also experimented with cast glass as a medium, with music and with animation, and in 2003 published The Artist – a colouring book for adults.

Annear retired to Cambodia in about 2000, where he continued to make jewellery. He died in Cambodia in April 2016.

Annear's work is held in a number of New Zealand public collections, including Auckland War Memorial Museum, the Dowse Art Museum and the Museum of New Zealand Te Papa Tongarewa.

== Further information ==
- John Daley portraits of Paul Annear, black and white photographs, c.1987. Collection of the Museum of New Zealand Te Papa Tongarewa
- Bone Stone Shell exhibition catalogue
- Mark Amery, Jewellery that speaks our way, The DominionPost, 30 October 2013. Review of the 25th anniversary re-staging of the Bone Stone Shell exhibition.
