= Alan Preston (jeweller) =

New Zealand jeweller (born 1941)

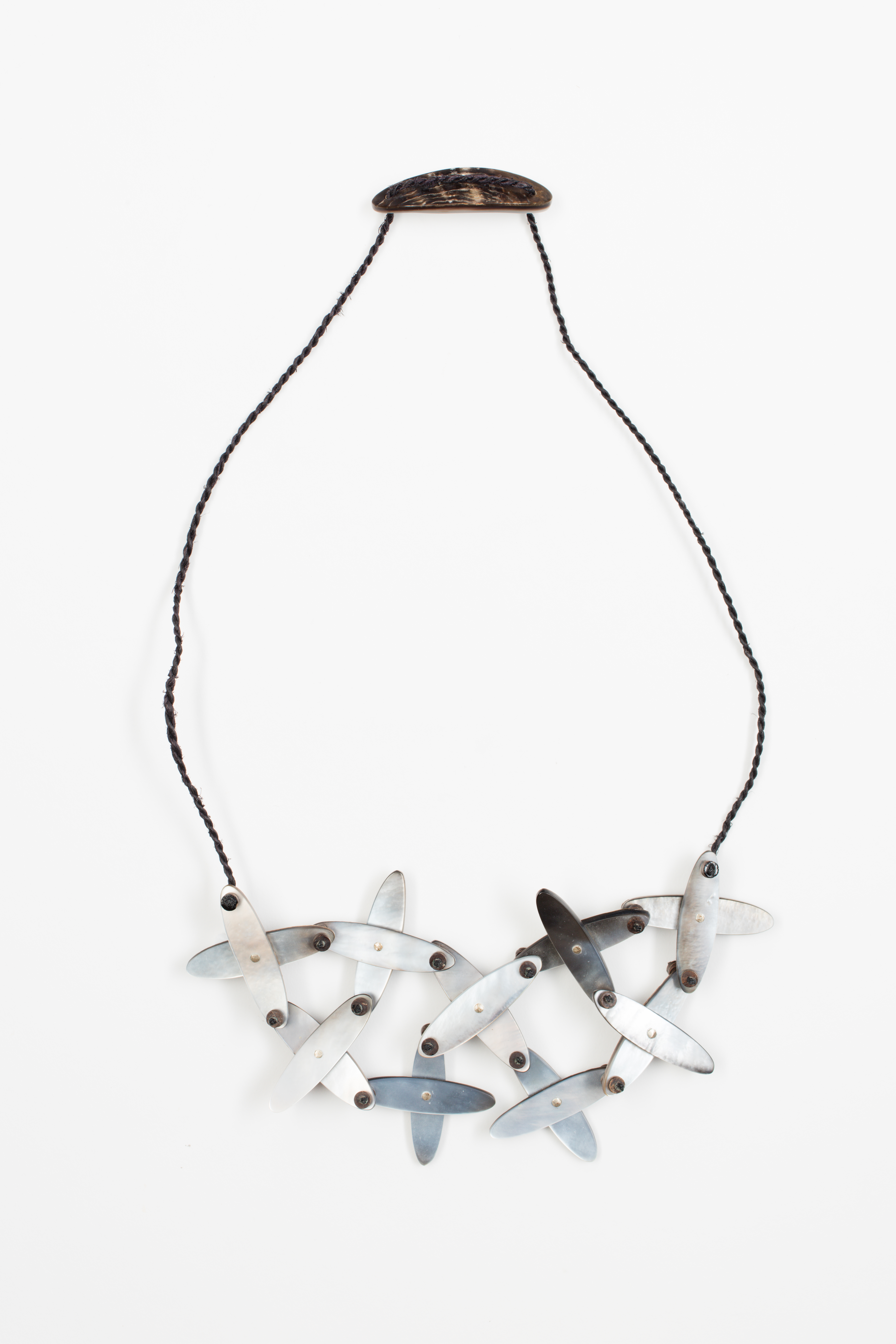
Necklace by Alan Preston

Alan Chris Preston (born 1941) is a New Zealand jeweller. His work has been exhibited widely in New Zealand and internationally, and is held in major public collections in New Zealand.

== Early life ==
Born in Te Awamutu in 1941, Preston completed a Master of Science degree in psychology at the University of Canterbury in 1967, and took jewellery classes at the Camden Institute, London, in 1973.

== Fingers gallery ==
In 1974, after a stint as a guest artist at Brown's Mill Market, New Zealand's first craft co-operative, in Auckland, Preston approached jewellers Ruth Baird, Roy Mason, Margaret Philips and Michael Ayling to open a jewellery shop called Fingers on Auckland's Lorne Street. Fingers, which moved to Kitchener Street, its current location, in 1987, is now New Zealand's longest-running contemporary jewellery gallery.

== Career and style ==
After a 1979 trip to Fiji, Preston began to incorporate forms and materials from Pacific adornment, including the use of shell, coconut shell and fibre, into his work. In 1983, Preston and fellow jeweller Warwick Freeman were asked by James Mack, then director of The Dowse Art Museum, to select items from Auckland Museum's collection for a 1984 exhibition at The Dowse titled Pacific Adornment.

Preston was one of twelve jewellers selected for the landmark 1988 Bone Stone Shell exhibition, developed by the Craft Council of New Zealand for the Ministry of Foreign Affairs, that was shown in Asia, Australia and New Zealand. The exhibition was restaged at the Museum of New Zealand Te Papa Tongarewa in 2013. Preston's work has been shown widely in New Zealand and internationally, including solo exhibitions at the Dowse Art Museum in 2007, the Auckland War Memorial Museum in 2009, and inclusion in the touring exhibition Wunderrūma: New Zealand Jewellery in 2014.

== Recognition ==
Preston's work is held in many public collections including The Dowse Art Museum, the Museum of New Zealand Te Papa Tongarewa and Auckland War Memorial Museum.
