= Kobi Bosshard =

Swiss-born New Zealand jeweller

- Born: Kobi Bosshard; 1939 (age 86–87); Uster, Switzerland
- Known for: Jewellery, goldsmith, silversmith

Kobi Bosshard (born 1939 in Uster, Switzerland) is a Swiss-born New Zealand jeweller. Bosshard was one of a number of European-trained jewellers who came to New Zealand in the 1960s and transformed contemporary jewellery in the country; others include Jens Hoyer Hansen, Tanya Ashken and Gunter Taemmler.

== Training in Switzerland ==
Bosshard undertook a five-year apprenticeship in Zurich with jewellery designer and craftsman Meinrad Burch-Korrodi, and studied at the Zurich School of Applied Arts.

== Career in New Zealand ==
Bosshard moved to New Zealand in 1961.

He worked briefly in a Wellington jewellery shop owned by a fellow Swiss jeweller after arriving in New Zealand, but found the work being done in the shop conservative and left after a brief time. He became a mountain guide, then returned to full-time jewellery making in 1966.

Art historian Peter Cape wrote in a 1969 survey of craft in New Zealand:

Kobi Bosshard has exhibited in a number of exhibition throughout New Zealand, and sells his work regularly through craft and jewellers' shops. He feels that, as a craft jeweller, he has considerable advantage over commercial jewellers, in that he is independent, and can design and work where and when he pleases, developing and following out his own idea, without the pressures of a mass market.

In 1970 Bosshard's work was included in Silver, Gold, Greenstone at New Vision Gallery in Auckland, the first substantial exhibition of contemporary jewellery in New Zealand. In 1972 he was included in Craft 72, an exhibition of New Zealand potters, weavers, wood-turners and jewellers organised by the Queen Elizabeth II Arts Council and toured overseas through the Ministry of Foreign Affairs.

In a 1985 interview Bosshard described his preference for using a limited number of machines in his jewellery making and avoiding pre-cut metals: 'If you buy pieces of silver cut to standard thicknesses, you are tempted to stay with those measurements. It's better to have fewer skills and be master of those than to have many techniques and end up working to formula'. In the same interview he said:

I have to make a piece of jewellery before I know what it looks like. My hands and material know what they are doing: the jewellery has to feel right or it's not successful. I try not to let my mind get in the way. I don't want to end up thinking I am smart and clever and using tricks.

In 1985–86 a retrospective exhibition of Bosshard's work was organised by the Manawatu Art Gallery and toured to the Auckland War Memorial Museum, the Sarjeant Art Gallery and the Dunedin Public Art Gallery. Reviewing the exhibition Douglas Standring wrote 'Kobi Bosshard has long been regarded as one of our best jewellery-makers, but this exhibition at the Manawatu Art Gallery confirms his position amongst the still small group of local craftsmen and women who are making more than craft'. Standring went on to describe the formal qualities of Bosshard's work ('each piece of jewellery is a highly focused design and this accounts for the austere, classical strain in his work') and note a new boldness in recent work:

A new set of brooches particularly display a bolder stroke — making, mixing an urban visual zap with Bosshard's habitual coolness. The key piece here is an experiment with free form and a larger scale: a lineal strip of silver is bent into a striking electric signature. The usual conventions of jewellery (solidity, the concealment of clasps and pins, the focus on the materials) are inverted: space becomes the dominant feature, and the lines which define themselves in that space. Thus the brooch pin is liberated from its usual role as practical appendage and becomes simply another line in space; an integral part of the design.

== As a teacher ==
Bosshard has also played an important role as a teacher of younger jewellers, including Peter McKay, Vicki Mason and Lisa Walker. Vicki Mason says:

My love of metal came from him and Fluxus as at art school I’d majored in 'hard media' (stone, wood, bone, glass, plastic etc) as opposed to metal. This is a love affair that I can’t let go of. He imbued me with a sense of the history of working with metal.

== Fluxus ==
In September 1983 Bosshard established Fluxus Contemporary Jewellery, a jewellery workshop and gallery, with Stephen Mulqueen in Dunedin; they were shortly joined by jeweller Georg Beer. Martha Moseth, writing in Craft New Zealand in 1985, stated

When goldsmiths Kobi Bosshard and Stephen Mulqueen opened Fluxus in September 1983 they were prepared for a few risks including a slow start and indeterminate debt. They have been surprised at the Gallery's success. On a 'bad' afternoon there are at least five potential customers and on a good day, thirty to forty. In its first eight months the Gallery has totalled over 200 sales and the future looks good.

The launch of Fluxus was motivated by 'frustration with limited access to customers and a faith in the future of contemporary jewellery'. The name 'Fluxus' was chosen 'for two reasons: for its reference to the 'flowing' agent, like Borax, that goldsmiths use and for the idea of flux, or change, which is part of the Gallery's philosophy of adapting to the needs of the artists and the community'. The gallery was modelled on Auckland's Fingers, functioning as a cooperative. In addition to the jewellers selling their own work a production line of jewellery was made and sold under the Fluxus name.

== Curatorial roles ==
Bosshard was a member of the selection panel for the influential 1988 Bone Stone Shell exhibition of contemporary New Zealand jewellery. In 1996 he curated the second New Zealand Jewellery Biennial, titled Same But Different, at The Dowse Art Museum. The exhibition had two key themes: 'that contemporary jewellery should remember the needs of the wearer; and that production jewellery was an honourable and important part of contemporary jewellery'.

== Recognitions ==
In 2012 Bosshard was recognised as a Master of Craft by Objectspace, an honour accompanied by a major touring retrospective exhibition and publication.

== 2017 documentary 'Kobi' ==
A documentary about Bosshard's life and work, 'Kobi', will premiere at the 2017 New Zealand International Film Festival in July 2017. The film is produced by Torchlight Films and directed by Bosshard's daughter, film maker Andrea Bosshard.

== Collections ==
Bosshard's work is held in the Auckland War Memorial Museum, the Museum of New Zealand Te Papa Tongarewa and The Dowse Art Museum.
