= Kirsty Cameron =

New Zealand costume designer

Kirsty Cameron is a New Zealand costume designer, production designer, writer, and film director.

== Background ==
Cameron's mother, Nanette Cameron, was an interior design tutor. Cameron grew up in suburban Auckland, where she still lives, and has a fine arts degree from Elam School of Fine Arts at the University of Auckland. Her interest in clothes and fashion led her to open a shop in 1983 called Vicious Fix on K Road in Auckland. This early business endeavour was accompanied by explorations in video and installation art forms, along with co-founding an artist-run gallery called Teststrip. She was also wardrobe styling for a local magazine and working with stills photographers before her film career began.

== Professional work ==
Cameron has worked in film, television, and theatre, designing, writing, and directing for her own as well as others' projects.

She has said that working on "performative works" is "creatively challenging in quite a different way" from cinema. "In cinema, I am used to thinking about character and clothing with intimacy and detail, imagined and edited through the lens of a camera," whereas working with an ensemble cast on stage "requires a more graphic, big-picture way of thinking."

Cameron notes that both Niki Caro and Jane Campion encouraged her "to bring my own sensibility and [to] trust my own instinct." For Campion's The Power of the Dog (2022), she took much of her inspiration from the script and the book, where she found "much mention of clothing" relevant to "construction of self" for several characters. For example, Cameron notes that Thomas Savage's eponymous novel notes that Rose, the female protagonist played by Kirsten Dunst, in the face of her changing circumstance, "began to look on clothes as costumes, disguises, to hide the useless and frightened self she was becoming.”

=== Film and television ===
Cameron's film career began in the early 1990s as collaborations with Niki Caro and Cushla Dillon. After working on Footage, a documentary by Caro, she worked on two Montana Sunday Theatre dramas (a form of "quality TV" similar to Masterpiece Theatre in the United States) that aired nationally on TVNZ. One of these dramas features Cliff Curtis in an early screen role. Cameron's first work on a feature film was also Caro's first feature, Memory and Desire (1998), which involved shooting in Tokyo as well as New Zealand.

Her work on Harry Sinclair's The Price of Milk (2000) generated an iconic image used repeatedly by the New Zealand Film Commission for publicity reels about NZ cinema showing Danielle Cormack wandering the green hills of dairy country in the Waikato trailing a long red sari. She has also worked with writer/director Fiona Samuel on Piece of My Heart (2009) for television.

Cameron's first experience as a film director, Behind Me Is Black (1999), a "memory film" that she co-created with Cushla Dillon, played at the 1999 NZ International Film Festival. She has written and directed the experimental film The Swarm (2005); Cross My Heart (2006; also producer), which played in the NZIFF's "Homegrown" program of locally produced shorts; and The Lethal Innocents (2007), which was invited to screen at festivals abroad as well as at home. For television, she directed and wrote Swansong (2012). She has also directed All This Time (2003), a music video, and edited the short film Behind Me Is Black (1999).

==== Awards and nominations ====
Cameron's first nominations came for Channelling Baby (1999; Christine Parker) and Rain (2001; directed by Christine Jeffs). She has won two New Zealand Film and TV Awards, the first in 2003 for Whale Rider (2002; Niki Caro), and the second in 2008 for Perfect Creature (2007; Glenn Standring). She has been nominated for other NZ Film and TV awards for costume design—In My Father's Den (2004; Brad McGann), The Strength of Water (2009; Armagan Ballantyne), and Love Birds (2011; Paul Murphy)—and for production design on The Weight of Elephants (2013; Daniel Borgman). In 2012, during a hiatus for the official NZ Film and TV Awards, she received a Best Costume Design award for The Orator (2011; Tusi Tamasese) from the Sorta Unofficial New Zealand Film Awards. In 2018 she received a WIFT NZ nomination for Achievement in Film for her work on Jean (2016; Rob Sarkies), a television biopic about Jean Batten, a pioneering airplane pilot, and The Rehearsal (2016: Alison Maclean), a film based on Eleanor Catton's first novel.

Cameron's costume designs for Jane Campion's The Power of the Dog (2022) garnered her international nominations for a Satellite Award and a CinEuphoria Award. This was the second western starring Kodi Smit-McPhee filmed in New Zealand that Cameron worked on, as she also was costume designer for Slow West (2015; John Maclean), which itself was also a directorial debut. Cameron has said that "having worked with Kodi [Smit-McPhee] before" gave her confidence in choices she made for costuming him for The Power of the Dog; "I knew he could pull this off. ... The simplicity of his costume leaves room for the mystery of his character."

=== Theatre ===
Cameron's experience designing costumes for theatre began at the Auckland Theatre Company, with a 2010 production of Harold Pinter's The Lover.

She has also designed costumes for dancer/choreographer Douglas Wright.
