= Tanya Ashken =

New Zealand silversmith and sculptor

Tanya Ashken ONZM
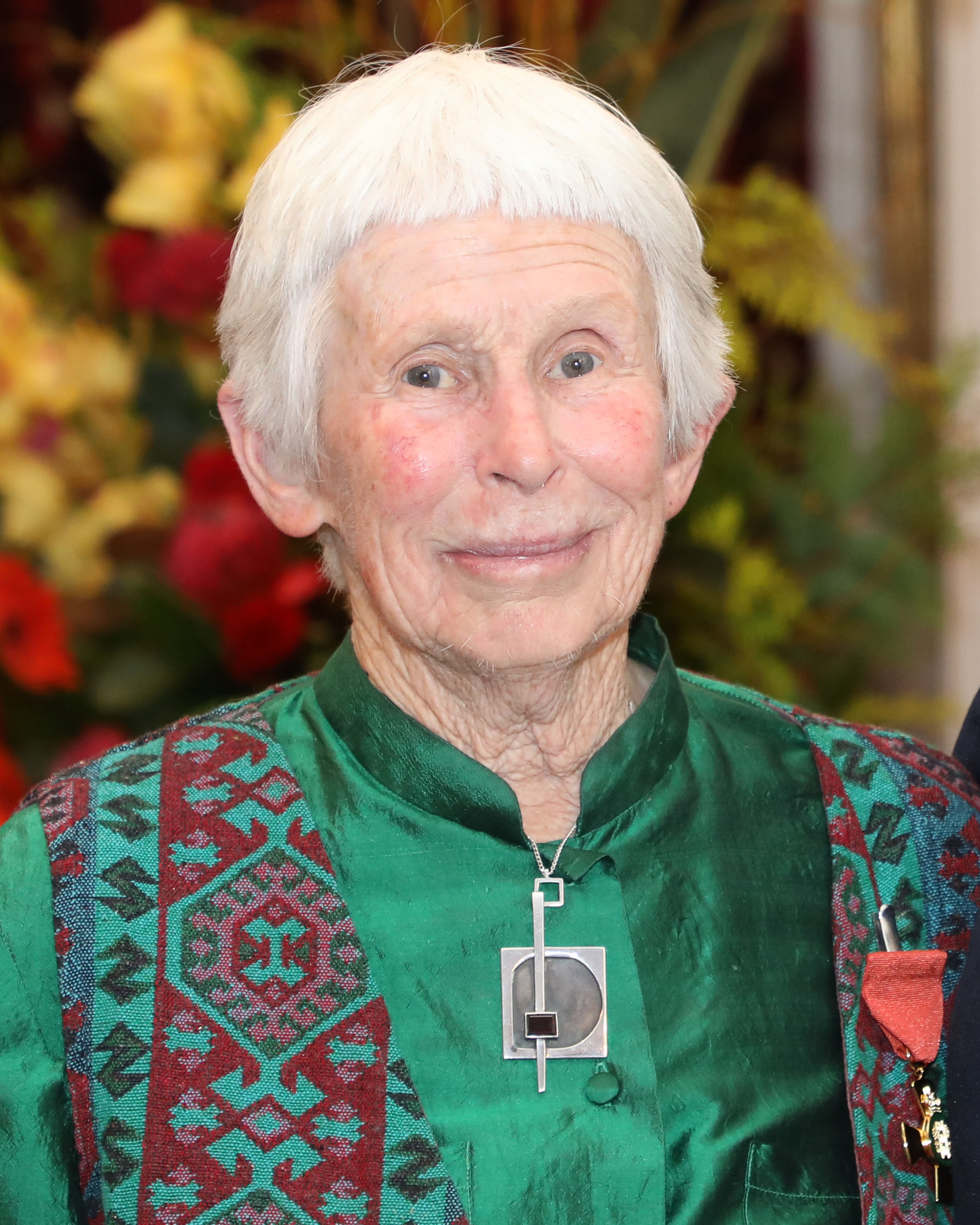
- Ashken in 2024
- Born: Joan Tanya Handley Ashken; 1939 (age 86–87); London, England
- Known for: Sculptor, silversmith
- Notable work: Albatross, Frank Kitts Park, Wellington (1986)
- Spouse: John Drawbridge (m. 1960; died 2005)

Joan Tanya Handley Drawbridge ONZM (née Ashken; born 1939 in London, England), known as Tanya Ashken, is a New Zealand silversmith and sculptor. She was one of a number of European-trained jewellers who came to New Zealand in the 1960s and transformed contemporary jewellery in that country, including Jens Hoyer Hansen, Kobi Bosshard and Gunter Taemmler.

== Life and work ==
Ashken attended the Central School of Arts and Crafts in London, where she was awarded a diploma in silversmithing in 1960, and also studied sculpture at the Atelier de Del Debbio in Paris the following year. In 1961, she returned to London and attended Camberwell School to improve her sculpting techniques. She began making jewellery in semi-precious materials in 1962. She does not draw a distinction between her jewellery and her sculpture: “her jewellery is small sculpture that can be worn.”

== Personal life ==
Ashken married New Zealand artist John Drawbridge (1930–2005) in 1960 and emigrated to New Zealand in 1963. In 1966, her work was included in Recent New Zealand Sculpture at the Auckland City Art Gallery.

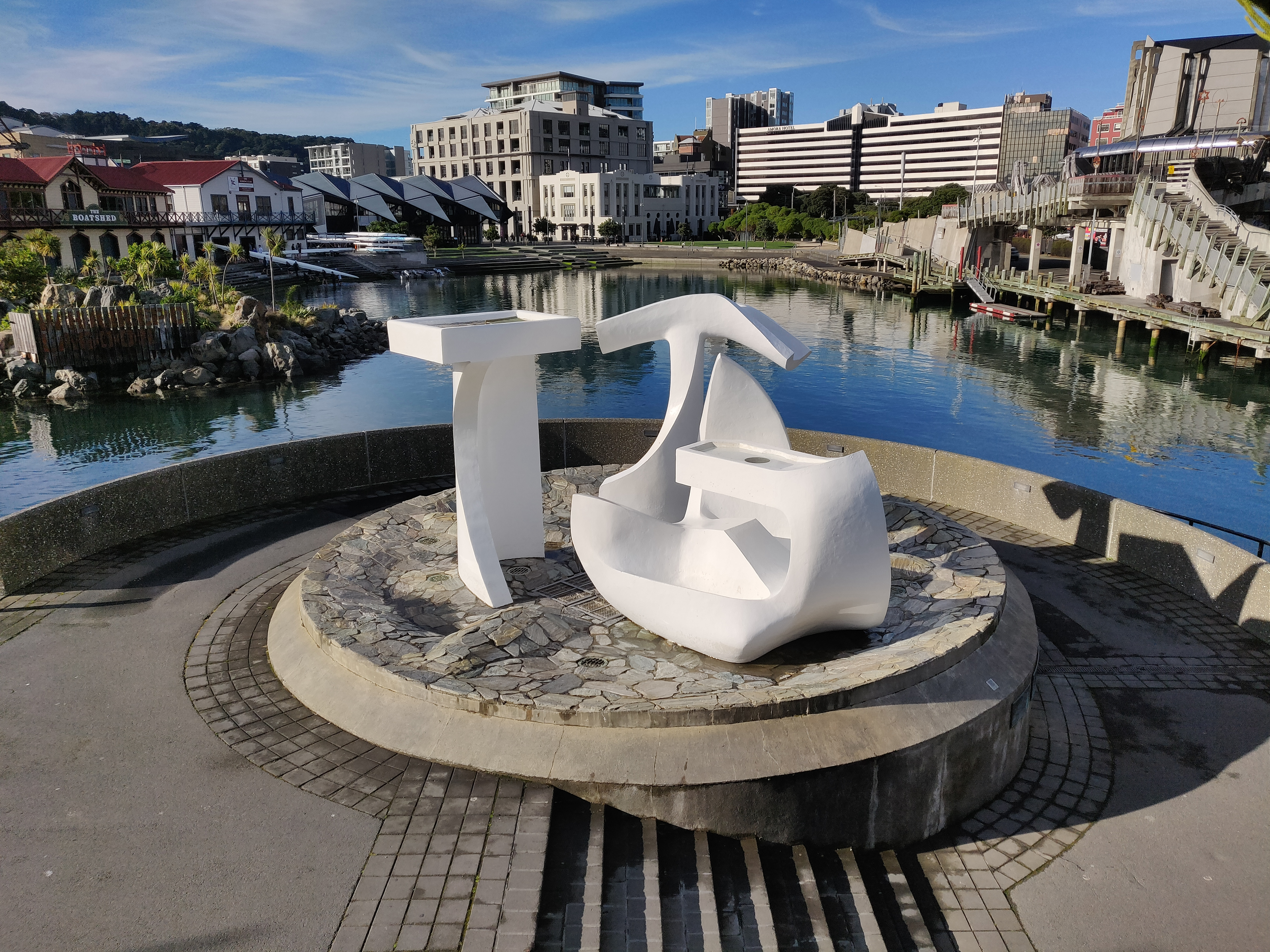
Ashken's albatross sculpture on the Wellington waterfront from above

== Awards and honours ==
In 1967 Ashken was the second artist to be awarded the Frances Hodgkins Fellowship, an opportunity for her to spend a year in Dunedin developing ideas for large sculptures. After this Ashken attracted a number of major commissions, including Seabird V (1974) for the New Zealand High Commission in Canberra and her best-known work, the water sculpture Albatross (1986) in Frank Kitts Park, Wellington. This was a first commission for the Wellington Sculpture Trust. Hone Tuwhare wrote a poem to mark the occasion. Ashken said she got the idea for the Albatross sculpture while walking along a beach in Island Bay in 1979 and seeing waves crashing around rocks. She initially submitted Albatross to the Aotea Square Water Sculpture competition and was shortlisted as one of six finalists. In December 1979 the commission was awarded to Terry Stringer's Mountain Fountain.

Art historian Anne Kirker describes Ashken's sculpture as “graceful organic forms articulated by the play of natural light”, and notes the evocation of “weathered stone or the graceful movements of seabirds – familiar components of her Island Bay home in Wellington“.

In the 2024 King’s Birthday Honours, Ashken was appointed an Officer of the New Zealand Order of Merit, for services to sculpture, silversmithing and jewellery.
