= Eléna Gee =

New Zealand jeweller (born 1949)

- Born: Eléna Gee; 1949 (age 76–77); New Zealand
- Occupation: Jeweller

Eléna Gee is a New Zealand jeweller known for her combination of metal work with organic materials, specifically pāua shell. She was a prominent figure in the Bone, Stone, Shell movement in 1980s New Zealand. She has had a long career with her work touring around Asia and Europe.

== Early life ==
Born in Auckland in 1949, Elena Gee gained her first skills in handcrafts from her family. Her grandmother taught her to make shell boxes when she was eight and she taught herself metalwork in her fathers workshop that he used as an aircraft engineer. Gaining her first skills in craftmanship from her family and with limited opportunities to receive professional training in New Zealand Gee describes herself as being 'largely self-taught.'

== Career ==
After graduating from St Mary's College in 1969 Gee spent a year as a trainee commercial jeweller. The following year she left for Australia where she held her first exhibition in 1972 at Gallery 16, Sydney. While in Australia she taught jewellery at the Waverly Woollahra Arts School and was a resident craftswoman at the Sturt Workshops in New South Wales. Her work was selected for two Australian exhibitions which toured Europe and Asia.

In 1981 she returned to New Zealand. Finding limited opportunities for craft jewellery compared to Australia, Gee became a founding member of Details a New Zealand craft jewellers group. in 1985 she joined Fingers, a jewellery co-operative in Auckland. This gallery is where Gee would showcase most of her work in the following decades.

In 1988 her work was included in the 'Bone Stone Shell: New Jewellery New Zealand' exhibition which toured for five years across New Zealand, Australia and Asia.

== Exhibitions ==
- 1972 Gallery 16, Paddington, Sydney
- 1976 Old Bakery Gallery, Lane Cove, Sydney
- 1979 Blackfriars Gallery, Glebe, Sydney
- 1980 Sturt Gallery, Mittagong, New South Wales
- 1981 Durham Arts, Auckland
- 1986 Fluxus Jewellery, Dunedin
- 1987 Finger Gallery, Auckland
- 1988 Fluxus Jewellery, Dunedin
- 1989 Nelson Polytechnic
- 1992 Finger Gallery, Auckland
- 1996 Finger Gallery, Auckland
- 1988 Scratching the Surface: Jewellery by Elena Gee, Bowen Galleries Wellington

== Group exhibitions ==
- 1979 5 women Jewellers Makers Mark Gallery, Melbourne
- 1980 Objects to Human Scale Craft Board of Australia, toured Asia.
- 1982 Skin Sculpture City Gallery Wellington, toured New Zealand
  - Australian Jewellery Craft Board Exhibition, toured Europe
  - Fingers Group Paua Exhibition Dowse Art Museum
- 1983 Impulse and Responses Goethe Institute, Wellington
- 1984 Wearables Exhibition Gus Fisher Gallery, Auckland
- 1985 First National Jewellery Exhibition, Compendium Gallery, Auckland
- 1987 Jewellery From around New Zealand Compendium Gallery, Auckland
- 1988 Bone, Stone, Shell, toured Australia and Asia
- 1990 Antipodean Dreams, Auckland War Memorial Museum
- 1992 Strum Fingers Gallery
- 1993 No Mans Land, Dowse Art Museum
  - Schmuckszene '93 Munich, Germany
- 1994 Jewellery by Paul Annear, Warwick Freeman, Elena Gee Bowen Galleries, Wellington
- 1995 New Zealand Craft in the Nineties Academy of Fine Arts, Wellington
- 1996 Second New Zealand Jewellery, Biennial. Dowse Art Museum
- 1997 Same but Different Dowse Art Museum.
