= Karl Fritsch (jeweller) =

German-born contemporary jeweller (born 1963)

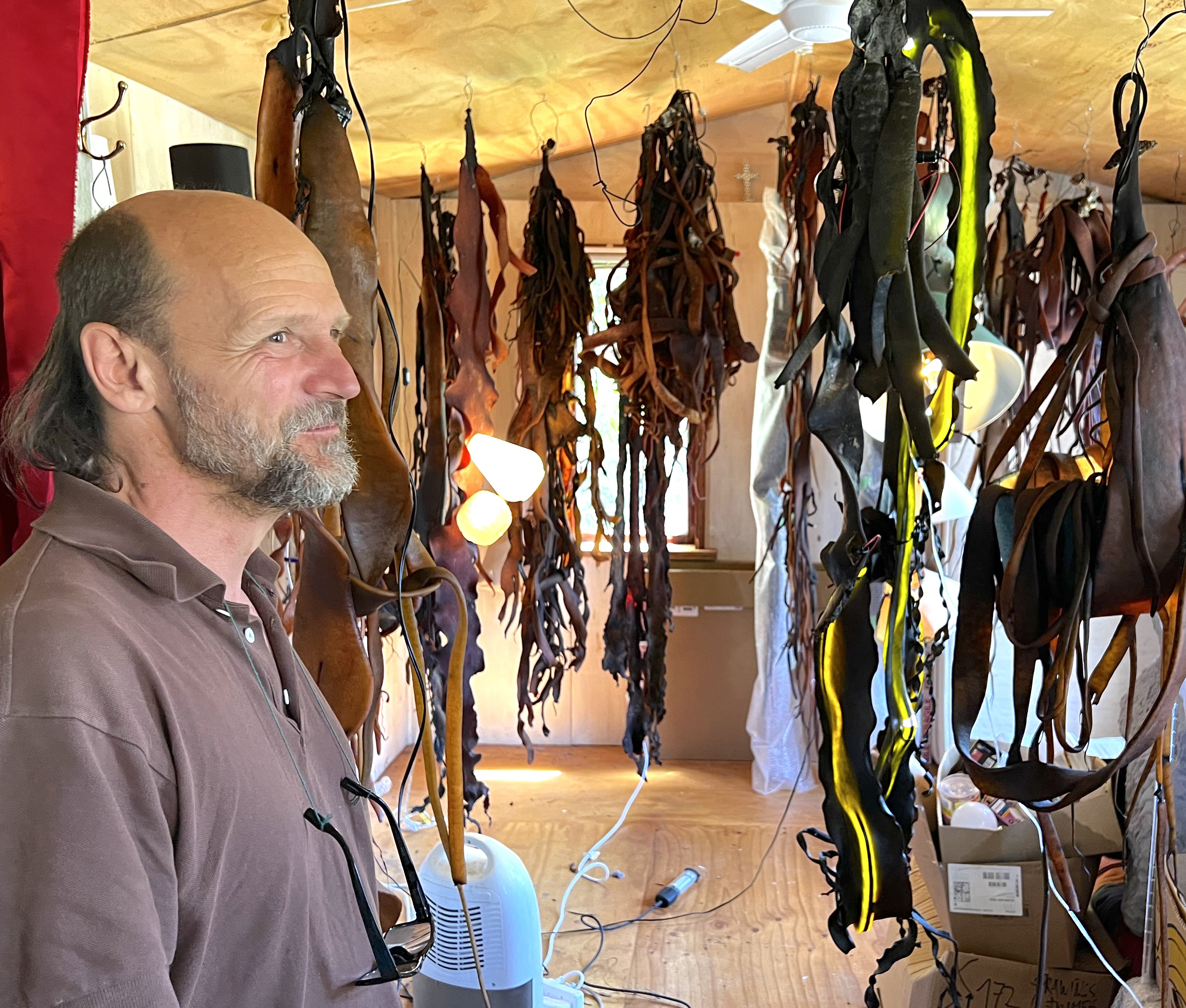
- Karl Fritsch in his Wellington studio, 2021
- Born: 1963 (age 62–63); Sonthofen, Germany
- Education: Goldschmiedeschule Pforzheim, Akademie der Bildenden Künste, München (1987-1994)
- Known for: Jewellery, metalwork
- Spouse: Lisa Walker

Karl Fritsch (born 1963) is a German-born contemporary jeweller who has since 2009 been based in New Zealand.

== Early life and education ==
Fritsch was born in 1963 in Sonthofen, Germany. He originally intended to study woodcarving but missed the application deadline, and his mother encouraged him to apply to a jewellery school. Fritsch trained as a goldsmith at the Goldschmiedeschule Pforzheim and worked for a jeweller before attending the Akademie der Bildenden Künste, München between 1987 and 1994, studying under Hermann Junger and Otto Kunzli.

== Career and work ==
In 1994 Fritsch established a jewellery workshop in Munich. In 2006 he received the Françoise van den Bosch Award, given every 2 years to 'an international jewellery and object maker who is recognised for his/ her oeuvre, influence and contribution to the field'. In 2009 Fritsch moved to New Zealand with his partner, New Zealand contemporary jeweller Lisa Walker.

Fritsch primarily focuses on making rings, although he occasionally makes other pieces of jewellery and objects. His work is characterised by rough finishes, visible fingerprints, the use of oxidised silver, and mixing high and low materials, such as precious stones, plastic pearls, and glass gemstones. He uses lost wax casting, moulding, and reshaping of found materials to make his jewellery.

In a 2015 interview Fritsch stated:

A key moment was while studying at the Munich academy around 1991/92 when instead of melting down the old jewellery I bought for casting, I started to fix the pieces instead. It was a revelation to be able to use those pre-existing often conventional pieces of jewellery. I had learnt to make conventional jewellery in Pforzheim and conventional jewellery is what was around in Sonthofen where I grew up. From that moment on I understood how to access all the conventional jewellery skills I had learnt and use them in my own way, I started to really own what I had been taught. I could suddenly set a stone, saw, file, hammer, cast, solder, the way I wanted and not just the way I had been taught .

Fritsch is known for a playful and unconventional approach to creating displays of his work. Critic Mark Amery wrote of a 2012 exhibition:

As the exhibition title Scenes from the Munich Diamond Disaster suggests, the pristine presentation of gems has been upturned, as if some artist jester has been at work after hours. There is a precarious profusion of divergent materials in explosive clusters, sprouting like fungi from brightly coloured lumps of plasticine. That might sound ugly, yet it is both beautiful and original in the way it builds new ideas out of both championing and questioning the old.

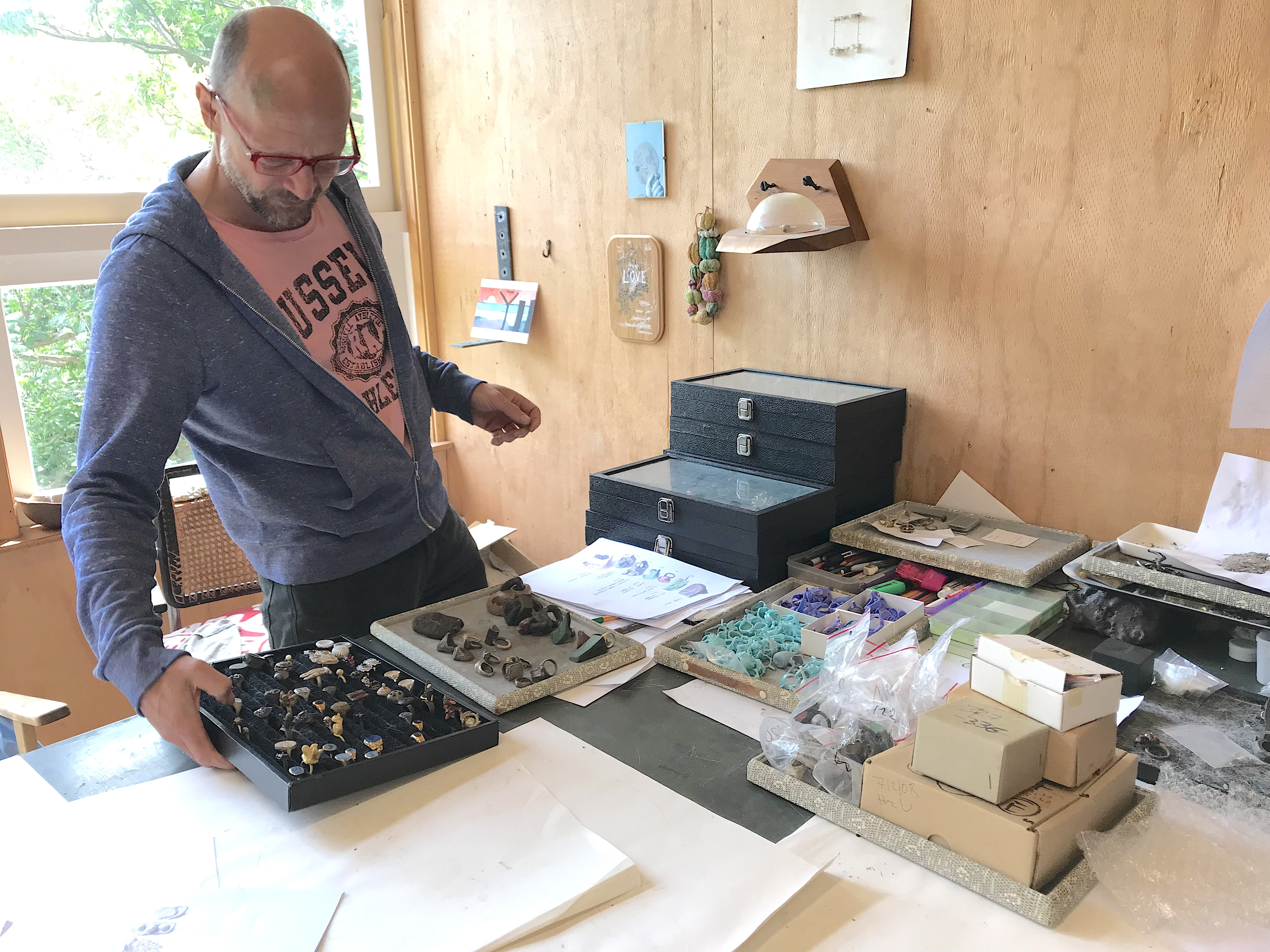
Karl Fritsch in his Wellington studio, 2018

As critici Warren Feeney noted in 2016, Fritsch's influence, along with that of fellow jeweller Lisa Walker and ceramicist Paul Maseyk, has been important in the positioning of contemporary jewellery and ceramics, which have 'increasingly sustained an influence in the contemporary art world that has been without precedent in New Zealand for more than a century.'

Fritsch has taught at art schools around the world. He also works collaboratively with a range of artists, including Feierabend (2009, Kate MacGarry, London) and Gesamtkunsthandwerk (2011, Govett-Brewster Art Gallery) with artist Francis Upritchard and furniture designer Martino Gamper, and several projects with photographer Gavin Hipkins.

Fritsch's work is held in many international museum collections, including the Stedelijk Museum Amsterdam, Neue Pinakothek Munich, the Metropolitan Museum in New York, the Museum of Arts and Design New York and the Museum of New Zealand Te Papa Tongarewa.

== Exhibitions ==
Fritsch's recent group shows include

- GlassWear at the Museum of Arts and Design
- The Turnov Collection, National Archaeology Museum of Lisbon
- Yellow Metals, Stedelijk Museum, Amsterdam
- Collect at the Victoria & Albert Museum, London.
- We did These Landscapes, Stoddart Cottage (with Lisa Walker and Brenda Nightingale.

Recent solo exhibitions include

- Karl Fritsch: persuasive proposals, Middlesbrough Institute of Modern Art
- 2010-11 Karl Fritsch: Scenes from the Munich Diamond Disaster at City Gallery Wellington
- 2011 Karl Fritsch: Rings Without End at Objectspace
- 2013 Karl Fritsch – Jewellery at the Manchester Art Gallery
- 2013 What I Do For You at Galerie Biró in Munich
- 2014 Craft at Gallery Funaki in Melbourne
- 2015 Love and Technique at Hamish McKay Gallery in Wellington
- 2015 Love and Technique with Lisa Walker at Rosemarie Jäger Gallery, Hochheim
- 2015 A Retrospective at Salon 94, New York City
- 2016 Der Tiefenglanz with Gavin Hipkins at The National, Christchurch
- 2016 Hi Cranky at The National, Christchurch

== Curatorial projects ==
In 2010 Fritsch was invited as guest curator for a new installation of international jewellery for the Danner-Rotunda at the Die Neue Sammlung. Previous curators for the space were Otto Kunzli and Hermann Jünger.

In 2012 Fritsch curated the exhibition Candelerium at Hamish McKay Gallery in Wellington, bringing together visual artists, jewellers and other makers.

In 2014 Fritsch co-curated Wunderrūma: New Zealand Jewellery with Warwick Freeman, a touring exhibition of New Zealand jewellery that showed at Galerie Handwerk in Munich as part of the Schmuck festival, at The Dowse Art Museum in Lower Hutt and at Auckland Art Gallery.

In 2015 Fritsch attended Talente and Schmuck, the international jewellery events held annually in Munich, as a curator as part of the New Zealand delegation of artists and curators supported by Creative New Zealand.

== Further information ==
- Damian Skinner and Kevin Murray, Place and adornment : a history of contemporary jewellery in Australia and New Zealand, Honolulu : University of Hawaiʻi Press, 2014. ISBN 9781454702771
- "Interview with Karl Fritsch and Warwick Freeman". Saturday Mornings with Kim Hill, Radio New Zealand National. June 2014.
- Interview with Warwick Freeman and Karl Fritsch on the exhibition Wunderruma, Auckland Art Gallery Toi o Tamaki, 2015
- Toni Greenbaum Grabbed by the fingers, ArtJewelryForum, December 2015
