= Helen Schamroth =

New Zealand crafts artist and author (born 1945)

Helena Jeannette Schamroth ONZM (born 1945) is a New Zealand craft artist and author.

== Biography ==
Schamroth was born in Kraków, Poland, just after World War II to two Jewish Holocaust survivors, but her milliner grandmother and shoemaker grandfather did not survive. The family emigrated to Australia and later moved to North Shore, Auckland, New Zealand. She served on the CreativeNZ Arts Board from 2000 to 2006.

In the 2005 Queen's Birthday Honours, Schamroth was appointed an Officer of the New Zealand Order of Merit, for services to the arts.

== Art ==
Schamroth makes textile arts, exhibiting primarily in Australia and New Zealand. In 2010 she was selected for the 13th International Triennial of Tapestry at the Central Museum of Textiles in Łódź, Poland.

== 100 New Zealand Craft Artists ==
A commission by Godwit Press led to 100 New Zealand Craft Artists which won the Illustrative Arts Award and the E.H. McCormick Best First Book Award for Non-Fiction at the NZ Post book awards. Among the artists included in this work are Raewyn Atkinson, Kobi Bosshard, Barry Brickell, Freda Brierley, Len Castle, Jens Hansen, Manos Nathan and Diggeress Te Kanawa.
