= Areta Wilkinson =

New Zealand jeweler

Areta Rachael Wilkinson (born 1969) is a New Zealand jeweller. In 2006, she was Premier Award winner of the Oceana Gold National Jewellery Awards.

== Education ==
In 1991 Wilkinson received a Diploma in Craft Design and in 2001 she completed a Bachelor of Design from Unitec Institute of Technology, where she studied under the esteemed Pauline Bern. In 2014 she completed a PhD in Fine Arts at Te Pūtahi-ā-Toi School of Māori Art, Knowledge and Education at Massey University in Palmerston North.

== Career ==
Wilkinson has been a practising jeweller for over 20 years and her work explores customary Māori adornment while pushing the boundaries of contemporary New Zealand jewellery practices.

She was a lecturer at Unitec Institute of Technology from 1995 to 2008 and a lecturer at Christchurch Polytechnic Institute of Technology from 2008 to 2009. "Her work emerges from the encounter of two things: contemporary jewelry, which she would define as a critical studio craft practice which makes objects that are grounded in an awareness of the body; and Maori systems of knowledge, which place people in specific relationships to each other and to the world and which sometimes use objects to mediate these connections."

During the 1990s, she found support for her practice through the Fingers Collective, a contemporary New Zealand jewellery store and exhibition space, and through cofounding a shared studio Workshop6.

Wilkinson has exhibited nationally and internationally and has work in both private and public institutions including Te Runanga-o-Ngāi Tahu, the Dowse Art Museum, Museum of New Zealand Te Papa Tongarewa and the Auckland War Memorial Museum.

In 2010, Wilkinson was artist in resident at the Museum of Archaeology and Anthropology, University of Cambridge, where her research centred on wearable taonga (treasures) held in the museum's collection. On 28 February 2016, Wilkinson gave a lecture with Alan Preston at the Pinakothek die Moderne in Munich Germany. In 2017 Wilkinson returned to the Museum of Archaeology and Anthropology as a visiting fellow, and as Visiting Wolfson College Research Associate at University of Cambridge.

== Recognition ==
- 2015 Recipient of the Creative New Zealand Craft/Object Fellowship
- 2012 Guest Judge for the Objective Art Awards 2012 Auckland Council Manukau Arts Centre
- 2009 Winner of The New Dowse Gold Award
- 2006 Premier Award winner of the Oceana Gold National Jewellery Awards.
- 2004 Aotearoa /NZ Maori Delegation for 9th Festival of Pacific Arts in the Republic of Palau.
- 2002 Commissioned by Ngāi Tahu to make a gift for Queen Elizabeth who visited a Ngāi Tahu marae whilst on a Royal New Zealand Tour. The result was a brooch called Aoraki Lily that was made from family heirloom white heron kotuku feathers in the shape of the native flower, a Mount Cook Lilly.

== Selected exhibitions ==
- 2024-2025 Meditations (with Moorina Bonini (Yorta Yorta/Wurundjeri/Wiradjuri), Lily Dowd, Te Ara Minhinnick (Ngaati Te Ata)), City Gallery Wellington Te Whare Toi
- 2020 Moa-Hunter Fashions, Christchurch Art Gallery; Toi Tū Toi Ora: Contemporary Māori Art, Auckland Art Gallery
- 2018 9th Asia Pacific Triennial of Contemporary Art, QAGOMA
- 2017 Repatriation (with Mark Adams), The National, Christchurch
- 2016 Kōrero Mai, Kōrero Atu, with Te Rongo Kirkwood, Auckland War Memorial Museum
- 2015 ARCHIVES Te Wahi Pounamu (with Mark Adams), Dunedin Public Art Gallery
- 2014–2015 Whakapaipai: Jewellery as Pepeha, Canterbury Museum, Christchurch; Objectspace, Auckland; The Dowse Art Museum, Lower Hutt.
- 2012 Pepeha Bartley and Company Art, Wellington
- 2012 Collecting Contemporary, Museum of New Zealand Te Papa Tongarewa
- 2003 Te Puāwai o Ngāi Tahu: Twelve contemporary Ngāi Tahu artists, Christchurch Art Gallery

== Personal life ==
Wilkinson is of Ngāi Tahu, Ngāti Irakehu and Ngāti Wheke descent.

== Further information ==
- Areta Wilkinson interview, Ngā Ringa Toi o Tahu web documentary series
- Megan Tamati-Quennell, Archives – Te Wāhi Pounamu, Areta Wilkinson and Mark Adams, Museum of New Zealand Te Papa Tongarewa, 22 December 2015
- Mark Amery, Show me your motion, The Big Idea, 26 August 2015
- Interview with Areta Wilkinson, The Dowse Art Museum podcast, August 2015
- Richard Bell, The Third New Zealand Jewellery Biennial: Turangawaewae: A Public Outing, Lower Hutt: The Dowse Art Museum, 1998.
- Deborah Crowe, 4th New Zealand Jewellery Biennale: Grammar: Subjects and Objects, Lower Hutt: The Dowse Art Museum, 2001.
- In Conversation with Areta Wilkinson, Art Jewelry Forum, September 2015.
