= Reginald Sturgess =

Australian artist

Reginald Ward Sturgess (18 June 1892 – 2 July 1932) was an Australian artist.

Sturgess was born in 1892 in the Melbourne suburb of Newport, Victoria, the son of cabinet maker Edward Sturgess and his wife Emma (née Ward), migrants from Bath, England. Sturgess had three brothers and a sister, but one brother died in England before the family migrated, and the other brother died soon after the family's arrival in Australia. Sturgess was the youngest child, and the only one born in Australia. The family was interested in the arts, particularly Sturgess' father, but also his elder sister Florence, who went on to become a successful pianist. Edward Sturgess was a good craftsman, having on one occasion decorated a carriage for Queen Victoria, but the economic slump of the 1890s following the land boom in Victoria led to a lack of business, and he abandoned cabinet making for a seed business in 1893.

Sturgess was educated at the Williamstown South State School, in the adjacent suburb of Williamstown, before leaving school at the age of twelve. In 1905, Sturgess enrolled in the art schools at the National Gallery of Victoria, with the help of novelist and Williamstown local Ada Cambridge, who had noticed his artistic talents. There, Sturgess studied drawing under Frederick McCubbin in the School of Design, and from 1909, painting under Lindsay Bernard Hall. Sturgess won several prizes while at the Gallery, including first prize for a drawing of a head from life in 1909, second prize for a painting of still life in 1910, and first prize for landscape painting in 1911.

Sturgess spent much time while at school sketching with his friend, noted portraitist Percy Leason. He also attended students' camps at Mount Macedon and Malmsbury, an area he would later visit frequently to paint. The female students at the camp would usually stay with the family of Meta Townsend, a Malmsbury local who was also a student at the Gallery from 1909 to 1914, while the male students would camp at the disused Coliban Flour Mill, the oldest mill in the district, a stone building with a waterwheel, set in farmland with many old farm buildings around which would become regular subject matter for the young artists.

Sturgess left the schools at the gallery in 1912, and began painting on his own, supporting his art by selling painted decorative lampshades, and by working in his father's seed business in Williamstown. He was also briefly a teacher at Williamstown Grammar School. Sturgess managed the seed business on his own following his father's death in 1916. On 30 July 1917, Sturgess married Meta Townsend at the Anglican church in Malmsbury. The couple would later have one daughter together, Elizabeth, born in 1919.

Sturgess joined the Victorian Artists' Society in 1921. Nine of his paintings were included in the Society's May exhibition, and another six in the September exhibition, but there was little early interest in his work from buyers, despite relatively low prices. However, he had more success from a joint exhibition with Granville Dunstan at the Athenaeum, also in September 1921, and in July 1922 he held his first solo exhibition, at the Athenaeum. It was successful, pleasing collectors and critics, who were impressed with his poetic (as opposed to realistic) approach, and his convincing depiction of atmospheric effects.

Sturgess exhibited regularly in Melbourne, at the Athenaeum in 1923 and 1924, and following that at the gallery of the Victorian Fine Art Society. He also showed in Adelaide, South Australia in 1926-1927 and in Sydney, New South Wales in 1928–1929. These exhibitions were also successful,

Sturgess was injured in a car accident in 1926, breaking his jaw, and although he recovered his health was affected. Sturgess closed the seed business in 1926 to concentrate entirely on his painting, but by 1930 his fading eyesight forced him to give it up. Sturgess eventually became ill, and died in 1932 at his Williamstown home. According to some accounts the cause of death was a cerebral tumour, probably brought on by the motorcycle accident, although no autopsy was performed, and Sturgess' doctors were never able to completely explain his ill-health in the years preceding his death. Sturgess was buried in the Williamstown Cemetery, and was survived by Meta and Elizabeth.
