= Shotei Ibata =

- Born: 井幡 松亭 (Ibata shōtei); Kyoto, Japan
- Occupations: artist; calligrapher

Shotei Ibata (井幡 松亭, Born: 1935) is a Japanese calligrapher and performance artist living in Kyoto, Japan. He is perhaps best known for his public demonstrations of Japanese calligraphy using a huge (up to 6 feet long) brush. He is also notable for his work, "to move calligraphy deeper into the modern world of art." Japanese calligraphy is usually a very private activity, but he would work in front of large audiences, holding many performances in a variety of countries around the world. He is the subject of the book, Shotei Ibata: Rock Music And Big Brush, written by Ildegarda E. Scheidegger.

== Bibliography ==
- Ibata Shotei artwork presented by Gunnar Nordstrom Gallery
- Beimel, Stephen H. (2009-05-20), "Meet Shotei Ibata-sensei. Moving Calligraphy into the 21st Century", Behind Paper Doors–a series about remarkable people in Kyoto
- Beimel, Stephen H. (2009-05-23), Calligraphy Continued: Kyoto Artist, Shotei Ibata
- Scheidegger, Ildegarda E. (2008), Shotei Ibata: Rock Music And Big Brush, Stämpfli Verlag
