= Octavia Cook =

New Zealand jeweller (born 1978)

- Born: Octavia Cook; 1978 (age 46–47)
- Education: Bachelor of Design (Jewellery), Unitec Auckland
- Known for: Jewellery

Octavia Cook (born 1978) is a New Zealand jeweller.

== Education ==
Cook graduated in 1999 with a Bachelor of Design in jewellery from Unitec Auckland where among other tutors she studied with Pauline Bern.

== Work ==
Cook's work examines the concept of identity and the inherent values attributed to jewellery. She says 'My work references familiar historical jewellery motifs, like the bow, skull, and cameo silhouette, which balance the personal nature of my subject matter'.

In 2002 Cook began working with the cameo form for which she has become known. She has several series of rings, brooches, earrings and necklaces that play with the ideas of cameos, mourning jewellery, and identity. For example, her 'Loved and Lost' brooches from 2006 take the form of updated mourning jewellery, but bear the faces of Cook family pet that have died, and have individual titles such as Lucky Cook', 1982-1991 and Sooty Cook, 1986-1987. Another work, OC v QEII (2006) is a reversible red and white brooch hung from a large bow, with Cook's and Queen Elizabeth II's profiles on either side. Also unconventional is the increased size of the brooches, and the use of brightly coloured acrylic.

In 2002 Cook also 'launched' her imaginary company Cook & Co, under which she produced her work for several years. Cook & Co draws a fictional link between Cook and Captain James Cook, and important figure in New Zealand history, and also plays on the name of famous jewellery brand Tiffany & Co. She produces themed branding and packaging that riffs on the branding and marketing strategies of international jewellery companies. Art critic Virginia Were writes 'Cook's autobiographical references and her lighthearted take on the weighty history of jewellery give her work a contemporary edge that propels it way beyond the confines of craft and art'.

Cook has exhibited both nationally and internationally. Her solo exhibition Dynasty: Works by Octavia Cook was held at The Dowse Art Museum in 2012. In 2023, Objectspace held the exhibition Cook & Company which featured new work by Cook alongside older pieces borrowed from private lenders and public institutions.

== Collections ==
Cook's work is held in numerous collections such as the Museum of New Zealand Te Papa Tongarewa, Auckland War Memorial Museum, Govett-Brewster Art Gallery and The Dowse Art Museum. Cook is a Special Advisor for the Objectspace Charitable Trust.
