= Jens Hoyer Hansen =

Danish born New Zealand jeweller (1940–1999)

Jens Høyer Hansen
- Jens Hoyer Hansen, Gold and Silversmith, based in Nelson, New Zealand
- Born: 14 July 1940
- Died: 10 August 1999 (aged 59)
- Occupation: Jeweller
- Known for: Created prop ring for Lord of the Rings

Jens Høyer Hansen (14 July 1940 – 10 August 1999) was a Danish-born jeweller who settled in New Zealand and did most of his well-known work in Nelson, New Zealand. Hansen was one of a number of European-trained jewellers who came to New Zealand in the 1960s and transformed contemporary jewellery in the country, including Tanya Ashken, Kobi Bosshard and Gunter Taemmler.

He was the designer and creator of the prop ring used as The One Ring in Peter Jackson's The Lord of the Rings and The Hobbit film trilogies.

== Life ==
Born in Gram, Denmark, in 1940, Hansen moved to New Zealand with his parents and siblings in 1952.

After undertaking a traditional jewellery apprenticeship at Sweeney's Jewellers in Auckland, he held his first solo exhibition at New Vision Gallery in 1960. He then returned to Europe and worked at A. Michelsen, the Court Jewellers, and the small Borup workshop in Copenhagen between 1962 and 1965. He also attended night courses at the School of Applied Arts & Industrial design, Copenhagen. He married Gurli Winter in 1965 and they travelled to New Zealand together, and opened their first jewellery business in Glen Eden, Auckland before moving to Nelson in 1968.

His first workshop in Nelson was initially in the couple's own home in Alton Street. He then moved to Hardy Street in 1970, and then to its current corner Selwyn Place and Trafalgar Square location three years later.

In 1975 he received the Queen Elizabeth II Arts Council travel grant to work as a guest at the Goldsmiths High School, Copenhagen, and left New Zealand again for two years.

Upon his return to Nelson with Gurli and his two sons Halfdan and Thorkild, he became instrumental, with Gavin Hitchings, in establishing jewellery classes at Nelson Polytechnic (now Nelson Marlborough Institute of Technology).

During the 1980s, he served as an advisor on the Queen Elizabeth II Arts Council of New Zealand, and was a founding member of Details, the Jewellers, Bone and Stone Carvers of New Zealand.

In the early 1990s he served as the Artist in Residence at Otago Polytechnic in Dunedin.

Across his lifetime he exhibited widely in over 30 solo exhibitions, and participated in a large number of group exhibitions in New Zealand, Australia, and Europe. In 2021 Polygon highlighted that, "While the One Ring may be Jens Hansen’s global legacy, evidence of his broader artistic impact on New Zealand art and culture appear throughout the island nation. 'He introduced emerging jewelers and silversmiths to workshop methods and forms of modernism through the Danish lens,' [Justine] Olsen told Polygon. In 2004, the national museum Te Papa added some of his early pieces to their permanent collection. Hansen also recruited and taught many next-generation jewelers and artists, through summer painting and sculpture classes at the local polytechnic, local workshop demonstrations, and offering bench space to any jeweler who asked".

== Notable works ==
Hansen was known for his creative and contemporary take on traditional Scandinavian jewellery design. Some of his notable works include:

- "The One Ring", an 18kt gold ring prop for The Lord of The Rings and The Hobbit film trilogies.
- The Jens Hansen Legacy Collection (formerly the 40th Anniversary Collection)
- Two silver jewellery pieces retained in permanent collection of Museum of New Zealand Te Papa Tongarewa, New Zealand's National Museum.
- The Golden Kiwi
- Super Rugby Trophy

== The One Ring ==
Peter Jackson's Art Direction team first approached Jens Hansen in March 1999, asking him for a design that would have the power and presence of the fabled ring in J. R. R. Tolkien's story. Fifteen prototypes were submitted, all characterised by Jens' sculptural simplicity of design, and each of a different gauge, weight and finish. From this prototype collection, the final 'Movie Ring' design was chosen.

Forty variations of The One Ring were needed for filming – from solid gold versions for petite Hobbit fingers, to the spinning ring filmed for the prologue of the first film.

The ring filmed for the films was not made with any Elvish inscription. The inscriptions that appear in a few special moments in the Lord of the Rings trilogy were computer generated in post-production. In The Hobbit films, no Elvish inscriptions are ever revealed.

In 1999 he was diagnosed with cancer, and died in August of that year, before having the opportunity to see his rings in the films.

== The Jens Hansen workshop ==
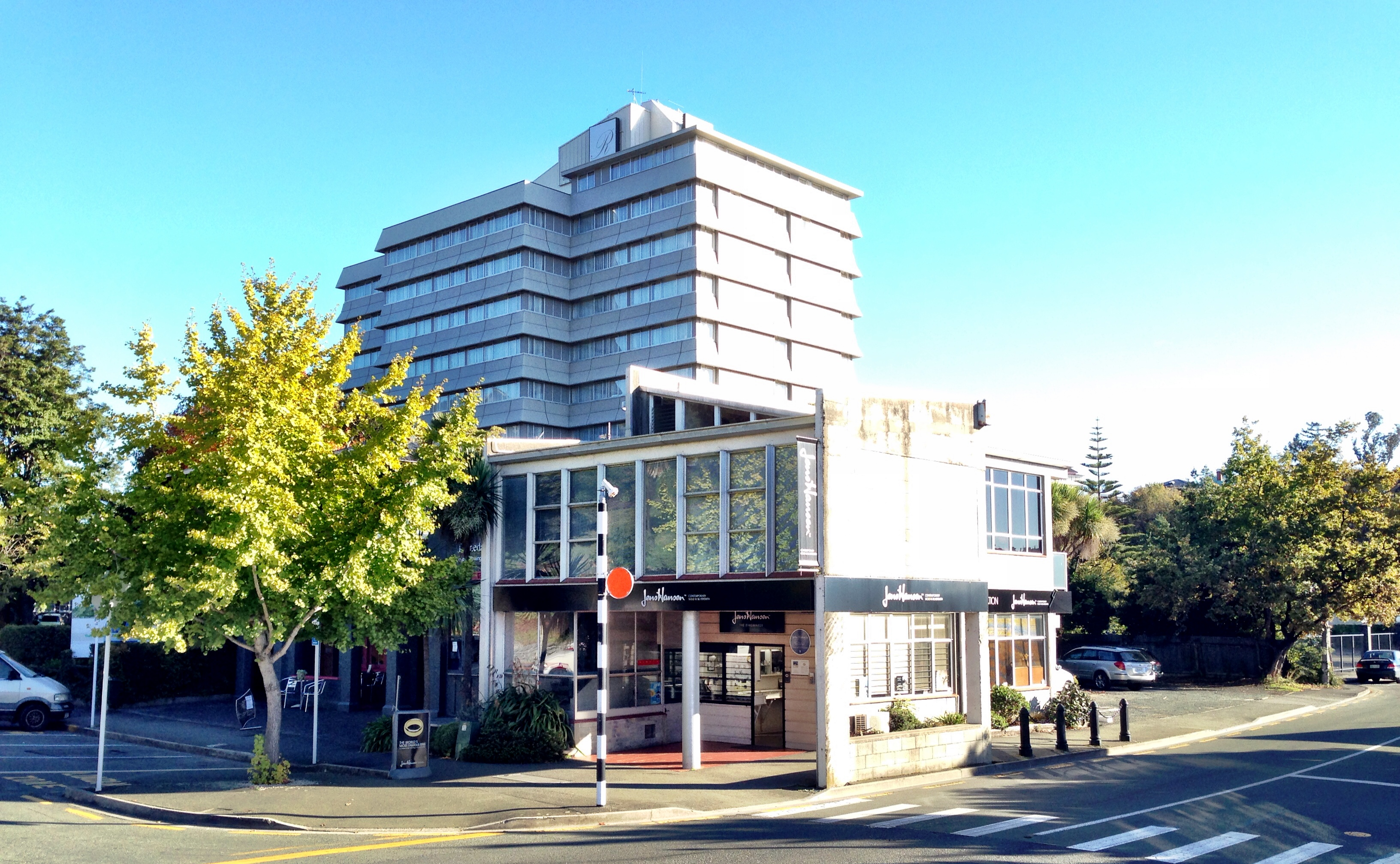
Home of The One Ring. The Jens Hansen The Ringmaker Gold & Silversmith jewellery studio workshop at 320 Trafalgar Square, Nelson, 7010, New Zealand.

The Jens Hansen Workshop in Nelson is located on the corner of Trafalgar Square and Selwyn Place.

Jens Hansen set up his first Nelson workshop in his and wife Gurli's home in Alton Street, Nelson in 1968. It moved to Hardy Street in 1970, and then to its current location three years later. Jens' eldest son Halfdan Hansen runs the Jens Hansen workshop, which is known as Nelson's most established and only internationally acclaimed artisan jewellery workshop. Today, two qualified in-house jewellers Zane Colegate and Simon Colegate re-create Jens' original designs and using modern jewellery making techniques design new Jens-inspired jewellery pieces.

Today, people come from all over the world to visit the Jens Hansen workshop, the workshop having become well known after Jens Hansen designed and made The One Ring for The Lord of the Rings and The Hobbit film trilogies.

== The Legacy Collection ==
The Jens Hansen Legacy Collection marks four decades of timeless design. The Legacy Collection is a selection of authentic designs recreated by hand from Jens' original production notes and includes classic experimental Jens pieces.

Jens' work always had a constant undercurrent of Danish architectural simplicity, but he liked to continually push the design boundaries. To mark the 40th Anniversary of Jens Hansen in Nelson in 2008, specific designs were selected, whose form had endured and defied fashion, but that had not been made for decades. These were recreated as the Legacy Collection. Every year around the time of Jens' birthday, the collection expands.
