= Objectspace =

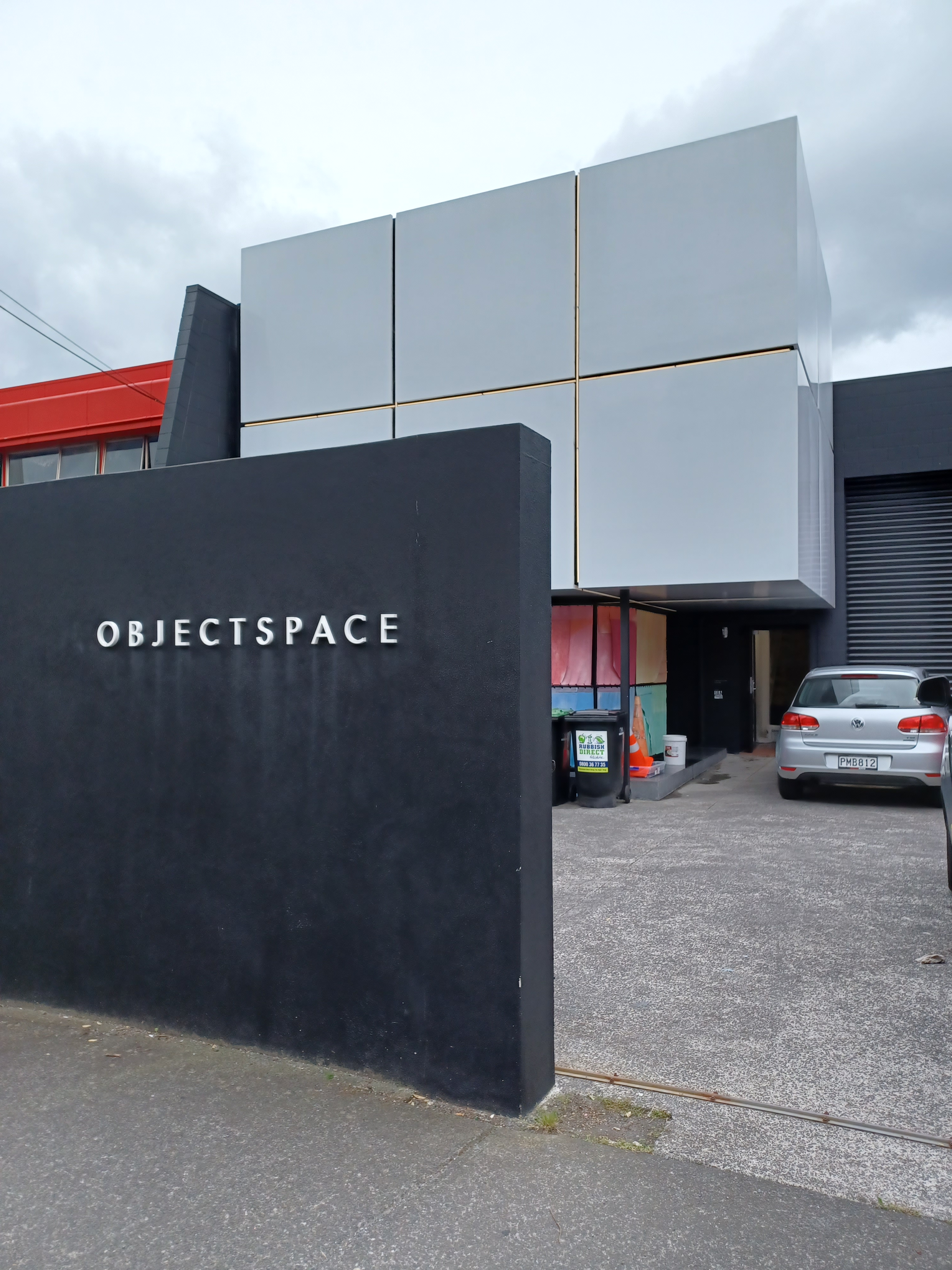
- Established: 2004
- Location: 13 Rose Road, Ponsonby, Auckland
- Coordinates: 36.8580°S 174.7475°E
- Type: Art gallery
- Director: Kim Paton
- Website: www.objectspace.org.nz

Objectspace is a public art gallery in Auckland, New Zealand. It opened in 2004 and is dedicated to the fields of craft, applied arts and design.

== Organisation ==
Objectspace's founding chair was jeweller Warwick Freeman. The gallery's founding director was Philip Clarke (2004 - 2015). Kim Paton was appointed as the current director in 2015.

Administered by the Objectspace charitable trust, the gallery receives support from Creative New Zealand and The Friends of Objectspace.

The 2017 trustees were:

- Andrew Barrie
- Ben Corban (Chair)
- Kristin D’Agostino
- Tommy Honey
- Kim Smith
- Kimina Styche
- Pauline Ray
- Deborah Crowe
- Kolokesa Mahina-Tuai
- Cathy Veninga

The trustees appointed Octavia Cook, Marianne Hargreaves, Justine Olsen and Areta Wilkinson as special advisors.

As of 2026, the trustees are:

- Ben Corban (Chair)
- Bhavesh Bhuthadia
- Jane Groufsky
- Johnny Hui
- Tyrone Ohia
- Kim Smith
- Jarcinda Stowers-Ama
- Kimina Styche
- Graham Tipene
- Kathy Waghorn

== Master of Craft series ==
The Objectspace Masters of Craft exhibition series highlights a New Zealand practitioner and is accompanied by a publication. Former chair Warwick Freeman writes 'A Master of Craft is someone who has acquired a deep understanding around a particular making practice. They make work that is honed by the experience of doing something very well for a very long time'. Artists who have been recognized in this series include:

- industrial designer Peter Haythornthwaite (2018)
- graphic designer Mark Cleverley (2014)
- interior designer Nanette Cameron (2013)
- jeweller Kobi Bosshard (2012)
- potter Richard Parker (2011)

== 2017 relocation and extension of mission ==
In 2017 Objectspace moved from its original premises to new premises at 13 Rose Road in Ponsonby, Auckland. The new gallery has increased space for exhibitions. The move was driven by an increase in Objectspace's funding from Creative New Zealand, to include the disciplines of architecture and design alongside craft and applied art. The opening exhibitions included an installation in the new courtyard space by Warwick Freeman, an exhibition of a collaboration between typographer Kris Sowersby and design agency Alt Group, and FutureIslands, a restaging of the New Zealand presentation at the 2016 Venice Biennale of Architecture. The new gallery opened on 27 July 2017.
