= Barbara Brash =

Australian printmaker (1925–1998)

- Portrait of Barbara Brash by Dorothy Braund, 1967, oil on canvas
- Born: Barbara Nancy Brash; 3 November 1925; Melbourne, Victoria, Australia
- Died: 20 February 1998 (aged 72); Kooyong, Melbourne, Victoria, Australia
- Occupations: Painter; printmaker

Barbara Nancy Brash (3 November 1925 – 20 February 1998) was a twentieth-century Australian artist known for her painting and innovative printmaking. In an extensive career she contributed to the Melbourne Modernist art scene, beside other significant women artists including: Mary Macqueen, Dorothy Braund, Anne Marie Graham, Constance Stokes, Anne Montgomery (artist) and Nancy Grant.

== Biography ==
Barbara Nancy Brash was born in Melbourne on 3 November 1925 to Elsa and Alfred Brasch. The Brasch family had established Brasch Brothers and Salenger partnership in 1866 and opened Braschs music store at 108 Elizabeth Street. Reacting to prejudice against German names during and after the First World War, Alfred anglicised his surname.

Barbara and her brother Geoffrey went to primary school at St. Margarets, Melbourne after which Barbara attended secondary school at the all-girls college St Catherine's School, Toorak, where artist Rosemary Ryan was a contemporary, both following Sunday Reed's earlier attendance. While Geoffrey inherited Brash's in the 1970s, Barbara did not join the business, instead caring for her ageing parents at the family home in Toorak until her father's death, though she produced several record covers for Brash's in the 1980s. She lived in the Toorak home briefly before moving to her own home in Kooyong in 1967, and lived there for the remainder of her life.

Barbara had family connections in the visual arts; in 1888 cousin Golda Figa Brasch married Louis Abrahams, a founding member of the Heidelberg School, and another cousin Reuben Brasch set up Curlew Camp, visited by Tom Roberts and Arthur Streeton in the early 1880s.

In late 1949 Brash travelled in Europe with Dorothy Braund, returning to Melbourne from London in 1951.

Brash's lifelong concern was for the environment and animals, and she willed large sums from her shares to support animal welfare; Wildlife in Secure Environment, The Animal Welfare League of Victoria, The Lost Dogs Home and Animal Hospital, and the International Fund for Animal Welfare were beneficiaries.

== Career ==
During a 50-year career, Barbara Brash experimented to extend the limits of the graphic medium, working in and combining woodcuts, linocuts, lithographs and screenprints, so that she became a pivotal artist in a post-WWII printmaking revival in Melbourne. Her work attracted the attention of the public as early as 1953; "Unusual grey and silver invitation cards have been designed by Barbara Brash for the "winter dinner" dance the Whernside Junior Auxiliary of the Royal Melbourne Hospital will hold at Ciro's on 19 June. Barbara, who is an old St. Catherine's girl, is doing an art course at the Melbourne Technical College."

Brash began printmaking in 1947 when she studied etching in informal classes run by Harold Freedman at the Melbourne Technical College (now RMIT), simultaneous with her training in painting and drawing at the National Gallery School under its first Modernist instructor, Alan Sumner in 1946. The analytical approach taught by the Gallery School assisted her to find her simplistic, rich, and dynamic style. Furthermore, as an avid student she undertook additional classes with George Bell at his private school, where she formed close relationships with fellow women artists Dorothy Braund and Evelyn Syme. Her work began to reflect the ideas and practices of Modernism including the principle of dynamic symmetry. As part of the George Bell Group, consisting of Russell Drysdale, Geoffrey Jones, Edwin Robinson, Dorothy Braund, Alan Warren, Roma Thompson, Peter Cox, Constance Stokes, Anne Montgomery, Ron Center, Sali Herman, and Alan Sumner, she exhibited frequently in their group shows.

Brash benefitted from revived interest in printmaking among the city's galleries and art schools, and local and émigré artists, including screenprinter Jan Senbergs and etcher Hertha Kluge-Pott, transmitted new techniques to eager local practitioners.

The Herald newspaper art reviewer 'L.T.', surveying the year's exhibitions of 1949, associates Brash with Alan Warren, Roger Kemp, Arthur Boyd, Keith Nichol, Eric Smith, Wesley Penberthey, Samuel Fullbrook, Robert Grieve, Dorothy Braund, John Brack, Leonard French and Barbara Robertson, as "the nucleus of a new and strong movement."

She also was a foundational member of a group, Studio One Printmakers, which formed in Melbourne in 1961 from the Print Studio in the Art School of the Royal Melbourne Institute of Technology [RMIT], which head of the art school Victor Greenhalgh had established for selected artists to have access to RMIT's print facilities. Its other members were Tate Adams, Hertha Kluge-Pott, Grahame King, Janet Dawson, Fred Williams, and Jan Senbergs. Tate Adams included her in an exhibition of Studio One Printmakers; Forty Prints by Seven Artists, which during 1963 toured the National Gallery of Victoria, Newcastle Region Art Gallery, Castlemaine Gallery, Rudy Komon Gallery (Sydney), Douglas Gallery (Brisbane), Bonython Gallery (Adelaide), Skinner Gallery (Perth) and Yoseido Gallery, Tokyo. Subsequently he opened Crossley Gallery, in Crossley Street, Melbourne, the first private gallery in Australia to be devoted exclusively to showing artists' prints, in 1966, and continued to show her work. Also that year Stuart Purves took on the management of Australian Galleries for the next five decades and during the 1970s, included Brash in its 'stable' alongside George Baldessin, Jeffrey Smart and Brett Whiteley.

On 23 October 1965 in the print room of the National Gallery of Victoria twelve people met with curator prints Dr Ursula Hoff to establish a national body to promote printmaking in Australia. The result was The Print Council of Australia; in 1981 Lillian Wood recorded that "from 22 June 1967 the first elected committee took over and it is interesting to note that of this first committee, three members continue to serve...Barbara Brash, Robert Grieve and Grahame King."

Brash often combined or modified existing techniques and materials, developing and exploiting a proficiency that encompassed a broad gamut of technical printmaking processes, such as screenprints which she adopted earlier than most of her contemporaries and exploited for its intensity of opaque or transparent colour. She continued to work into her seventies and embraced the nascent field of digital printmaking technologies as enthusiastically as traditional media.

== Style ==
Brash's early output, mostly linocuts and etchings, was in a Classical Modernist style and her love of animals and the environment inspires much of the subject matter. In the 1960s she adopted the new medium of silkscreen, which artists were taking up from industrial applications in which it had been used since the turn of the century, and she explored its effects of solid or translucent colour in boldly graphic abstract works, enhanced with innovations such as embossing and textured inks, as seen in her complex print of 1967 Promontory.

Brash revealed details of her working method in an interview for The Age when she was preparing for a solo show at Australian Galleries in 1965:

"I had wanted a printing press for a long time," Miss Brash said yesterday, "but always seemed to miss out to junk yards. Then I found this mangle and had it converted. It's too big to fit into the house, so I keep it in the garage." Previously, Miss Brash said, she had depended on the hospitality of the art school of the Royal Melbourne Institute of Technology to do her printing. The forthcoming exhibition will be her first one-woman show of screen prints and etchings...20 pieces [representing] about two years' work. Miss Brash said she had given all her time lately to this work and had not done any painting. She enjoyed exploring the possibilities of a medium to the limit of the material, she said, and had been translating all her ideas into this medium so each print was a work in Its own right, not just a reproduction of a picture. Miss Brash said she had one plastic print in the exhibition. This was an experimental work which had turned out more successful than she had hoped. She had used plastic for the plate in an endeavour to get a higher relief and has chosen a thick Japanese paper, like blotting paper, she said. The paper had held its form well and the result has a sculptured effect with a translucent quality about the ink. "I was afraid It might break the press but although the plate is cracking the press has not suffered,...”

After a quiescence in the 1980s, Brash was excited anew by the advent of digital printmaking which she experienced while attending the workshops of Bashir Baraki with whom in 1996 she published the collaborative editions comprising their The Image Makers. Works such as Fossilised of 1993 exemplify the freedom afforded her in these highly coloured abstractions. Her 1997 series of digital prints Sludge is intended as an insight into destruction of the environment.

== Reception ==
It is a reflection of her innovation that Alan McCulloch writing in 1953 in The Herald noted Brash's application of flat, intense hues in "colorful works after the pattern of cut outs…," while The Bulletin condemned it; "There is Barbara Brash's "Seated Woman," whose flesh and nightdress have all the variety of a coat of whitewash applied to a smooth surface." In 1954 The Age art critic called attention to the "two-dimensional pattern with decorative effect" in her lino-cuts, an observation that The Herald critic repeated; "Barbara Brash is boldly decorative in a series of color lino-cuts. The Age also drew attention in the same Forty Prints by Ten Artists show at Peter Bray Gallery, opened by Ursula Hoff, to Brash's spanning of oil and watercolour painting and printing, noting that "she feels this new medium [lithography] has a wide scope for experiment and is something which should be developed.

The same show traveled to Brisbane where Courier-Mail critic Gertrude Langer recognised "exceptional gifts" that in Brash's "colour linocut Native Dancer (which the group used as their poster), could not be bettered in composition and colour." Another Brisbane report noted that "This lithograph exhibition — the first of its kind in Australia — has aroused considerable interest, buyers coming from as-far afield as New Zealand and Tasmania. Particularly noteworthy is the work of Barbara Brash, Kenneth Jack and Walter Gheradin, although all 10 artists excel at individualised style amid skilful handling of their media."

Another 1954 exhibition at Peter Bray over November–December prompted Arnold Shore to comment on Brash's "more exciting colours," and though Alan McCulloch condemned the show for its 'absence of ideas', he conceded "Barbara Brash's Woman Seated has the forthright quality of a vividly stencilled fabric design" while Allan David in the Jewish News affirmed its "decorative" "colour and design." In 1955 Arnold Shore in The Argus starts to see "romantic suggestion" in the "elusive variety of pattern ... of a Landscape, by Barbara Brash."

Modernist developments in 1955 still aroused suspicion in some quarters. Of the December show at Peter Bray of the George Bell Group the traditionalist magazine The Bulletin is typically sardonic; "Barbara Brash's Landscape with Houses is a little looser [in brushwork], as is her Old Farm, which has two trees, two wheels and a ladder, and which is easily recognisable as contemporary“ Nevertheless, the National Gallery of Victoria purchased one of her works from the Group's show in 1956 at Peter Bray.

By 1960 the Canberra Times praised innovation; "Barbara Brash illustrates the use of overprinting in lino cut on rice paper, using many strong, transparent colours. The Peacock is a radiating composition with pattern and line assisting the glowing colours to make it most decorative," and of the same show "Melbourne Prints," when it traveled to South Australia, The Bulletin's Geoffrey Dutton was prepared to appreciate her experiments; "Barbara Brash lays on color with the most notable effect in the show, in separate blocks in Lighthouse and in gauzy veils in Peacock." His appraisal was re-enforced in Arnold Shore's comment in 1962 that "Brash revels in color in her seriographs [...] and there is exquisite quality in her etching Surfaces;" and by Bernard Smith, who had singled out Brash's contribution to the 1963 Studio One exhibition at the National Gallery of Victoria as "colorful and poetic." In his review of her 1965 solo show of screen prints and etchings of birds, flowers and gardens at Australian Galleries, Smith rated her works "Intimate, well-designed, craftsmanly," and considered that "several of the aquatints reveal an exquisite sensitivity to tone and texture, especially the Magic Garden, with its haunting, enigmatic beauty; and the superb formal and tonal control of Composition."

Patrick McCaughey in a review of Barbara Brash's silk screen prints at Crossley Gallery considered them "lively, decorative and unpretentious. When she cuts the color into another color instead of laying it neatly alongside, her work takes on a quiet distinction.

She died suddenly on 20 February 1998.

== Awards ==
- 1948: 2nd prize (a landscape) Jewish Competitions Society series of competitions
- 1949: Sara Seri Scholarship, judged by A.M.E. Bale, Eric Thake, Douglas Dundas and Daryl Lindsay
- 1951: Victorian Jewish Competitions Society 1at Prize, Art Division
- 1975: Warrnambool
- 1980: Stanthorpe
- 1981: Mornington
- 1984: Victor Harbor Drawing Prize
- 1988: selected award, 5th International Miniature Print Exhibition, Seoul, Sth Korea

== Collections ==
=== National and state ===
- National Gallery of Australia, 286 works
- Art Gallery of New South Wales
- Art Gallery of Western Australia
- National Gallery of Victoria
- Queensland Art Gallery
- Australian War Memorial
- Heide Museum of Modern Art
- Artbank

=== Regional galleries ===
- Castlemaine Art Museum
- McClelland
- Mornington
- Newcastle
- Stanthorpe
- Swan Hill
- Wagga Wagga Art Gallery
- Warrnambool

=== Tertiary collections ===
- University of Melbourne
- Adelaide University
- Flinders University
- Monash University
- University of Western Australia, Cruthers Collection of Women's Art, 23 works from the Barbara Brash estate

== Exhibitions ==
=== Group ===
- 1948, April: Victorian Artists' Society
- 1952, October: Victorian Artists' Society
- 1953, August: George Bell group, with Anne Montgomery, Roma Thompson, Dorothy Braund and Constance Stokes, Peter Bray Gallery
- 1953, October: Victorian Artists' Society Autumn Exhibition
- 1954, from 27 April: Forty Prints by Ten Artists (3 women, Brash with F. Higgs and Jennifer Purnell)), opened by Ursula Hoff, Peter Bray Gallery
- 1954, May: Forty Prints by Ten Artists, Johnstone Gallery, Brisbane
- 1954, October: Contemporary Art Society exhibition of graphic art, P. W. Cheshire's Bookshop, 338 Little Collins St. with Charles Blackman, Kenneth Jack, and Edith Wall
- 1954, October: Painting, Melbourne Contemporary Artists at Vic Artists Society 1 Albert St East Melbourne
- 1954, 22 November–2 December: George Bell Group, Peter Bray Gallery
- 1955, 20 May–2 June: Thirty-Six Prints by Twelve Melbourne Artists: Tate Adams, Christine Aldor, Ian Armstrong, Geoff Barwell, Barbara Brash, David Allen, William Gleeson, Florence Higgs, Kenneth Jack, Verdon Morcom, Harry Rosengrave, Guenter Stein. Peter Bray Gallery
- 1955, 8–20 June: Thirty-Six Prints by Twelve Melbourne Artists. Johnstone Gallery, Brisbane
- 1955, 25 July–1 August: Thirty-Six Prints by Twelve Melbourne Artists. Riverside Gallery, Canberra
- 1955, October: Victorian Artists Society
- 1955, November: Fine Arts Week exhibition of painting, sculpture, pottery, and allied arts, with William Dobell, Russell Drysdale, Leonard French, Roger Kemp, Constance Stokes, Len Annois, Dawn Sime, Alan Warren, Tina Wentcher, Arthur Boyd, Noel Counihan. Tasmanian Tourist Bureau gallery, 254 Collins St
- 1956, from 1 June: Melbourne Woman Painters: with Joy Hester, Phyl Waterhouse, Lena Bryans, Guelda Pyke, Valerie Albiston, Ann Taylor, Dawn Sime, Dorothy Braund, Barbara Brash. Erica McGilchrist, Yvonne Cohen, Mirka Mora, Yvette Anderson, Christine Miller and Elena Kepalaite. Museum of Modern Art Australia, Tavistock Place, Melbourne
- 1956, to 28 June: with Dorothy Braund, Helen Ogilvie, Guelda Pyke, Roma Thomson, Phyl Waterhouse, and six male artists, Paintings for Seven Guineas, Peter Bray Gallery
- 1956, 25 September–4 October: Melbourne Graphic Artists, Mary MacQueen, Kenneth Jack, Christine G. Miller, Harry Rosengrave, Tate Adams, Florence M. Higgs, Verdon Morcom, Lesbia Thorpe, Ian Armstrong, Barbara Brash, David Dalgarno, Anne Scott, William Gleeson, Edith Wall, Robin Hill. Peter Bray Gallery, Bourke St Melbourne
- 1956, October: Melbourne Contemporary Artists Annual Exhibition with Douglas Annand, Michael Shannon, Ronald Millar, Richard Chriton, Helen Maudsley. Victorian Artists' Society, East Melbourne
- 1956, 12 November–15 December: Olympic Fine Arts Festival. National Gallery of Victoria
- 1957, December: George Bell Group. Brummels Gallery, South Yarra
- 1958, September: Melbourne Contemporary Artists. Victorian Artists' Society, East Melbourne
- 1958, November: Graphic Artists: including Anne Graham, Barbara Brash, Nancy Clifton, Florence Higgs, Mary Macqueen, Christine G. Miller, Wendy Rendell. Lesbia Thorpe, Edith Wall, Fred Williams, John Brack, Noel Counihan, Ray Crooke, Roy Bizley, V.G. O'Connor, Arthur Boyd, Kenneth Jack, Len Annois. Australian Galleries, Collingwood
- 1960, from 27 May: Melbourne Prints 1960, Canberra Art Club
- 1960, December: Melbourne Prints, Royal South Australian Society of Arts
- 1961, August: Melbourne Contemporary Artists, Argus Gallery
- 1962, 50 members in Melbourne Contemporary Artists 1962 Exhibition, including women Mary McQueen, Edith Wall, Clothilde Atyeo, Valeria Albiston, Christine Aldor, Mignonne Armstrong, Barbara Brash, Margaret Benwell, Yvonne Cohen, Joyce Donovan, Margaret Dredge, Dorothea Francis. Peggy Fauser, Marion Fletcher, Nancy Grant, Rosa Garlick, Inez Hutchison, Evelyn McCutcheon, Joan Marks, Maidie McGowan, Lucy Newell, Yvonne Pettengell, Guelda Pyke and Ellen Rubbo. opened by Prof. Joseph Burke Argus Gallery Melbourne
- 1963, from 12 August: Melbourne Contemporary Artists 1963 exhibition, Argus Gallery, Melbourne
- 1963, September: Studio One Printmakers, Print Gallery, National Gallery of Victoria
- 1965, July: Exhibition of work by former students of the Royal Melbourne Institute of Technology. Opened by Governor Sir Rohan Delacombe. Storey Hall
- 1963, 12 August: Melbourne Contemporary Artists 1963 Exhibition, with women artists including Anne Montgomery, Evelyn McCutcheon, Mary McQueen, Edith Wall, Barbara Brash, Margaret Dredge, Marion Fletcher, Marjorie Woolcock, Constance Stokes and Guelda Pyke. Argus Gallery Melbourne
- 1963, September: Prints' 63: Tate Adams, Barbara Brash, Janet Dawson, Grahame King, Hertha Kluge-Pott, Fred Williams, John Senbergs. National Gallery of Victoria
- 1963, 1 September: Prints '63, Studio One Printmakers, Tate Adams, Barbara Brash, Janet Dawson, Grahame King, Hertha Kluge-Pott, Jan Senbergs, Fred Williams. Castlemaine Art Gallery and Historical Museum
- 1966: Barbara Brash, Mary Macqueen, Lesbia Thorpe. Crossley Gallery, Crossley St., Melbourne
- 1969, December: 3rd Print Prize Exhibition of the Print Council
- 1973, March: an exhibition of prints by Barbara Brash, Noela Hjorth, Moonya McNeilage, Richard Beck and Robert Trauer. Brotherhood of St.Laurence Bazaar, East Bentleigh
- 1973, August: Ian Armstrong, Barbara Brash, Nancy Clifton, John Borrack, Arch Cuthbertson Mary MacQueen Anne Montgomery David Newbury and others. The Coombe Down-Flinders Gallery 327 Shannon Avenue, Newtown, Geelong
- 1974, March: Paintings: Arthur Boyd, Sidney Nolan, Frank Matsaers, J. Coln Angus, Pro Hart. Arthur Hamblin, Alan Bernaldo. Mal Gilmour, Fred Whiliams, Barbara Brash and others, Butterfly Art Gallery, Balaclava
- 1975, July: Graphic artists. Australian Galleries, Collingwood
- 1977, 22 February–16 March: Clive Parry Galleries, Beaumaris
- 1978, April: Recent Australian Prints, Caulfield Arts Centre
- 1978, August: Annual exhibition of the Print Council of Australia, Meyers Blaxland Gallery
- 1978, December: 10th Birthday Exhibition of Paintings. Manyung Gallery, Mt Eliza
- 1979, 10–11 February: Henty Electorate Committee : Fourth Annual Art Show: Clare Baimford, Charles Bock, Barbara Brash. Judy Brownie, Freya Dade, Margot Fincher, Anne Graham, Frank Harding, Kate Hellard, Nora Hutchinson, Gareth Jones-Roberts, Alan McCulloch, Alexander McLintock, David Newbury, Undine Padoms, Janet Price, Pauline Quinn, John Rowell, Jane Stapleford, Pierre Struys, Noel Teasdale. 407 North Road, Sth. Caulfeld
- 1981, December: Contemporary Australian printmakers: Veda Arrowsmith, Helen Best, Peter Bond, Barbara Brash, Trisha Carland-Salih, John Coburn, Ruth Faerber, Robert Grieve, Basil Hadlewy, Jean Johnson, Edgars Karabanovs, Ursula Laverty, Alun Leach-Jones, Bill Meyer, Max Miller, Shirley Miller, Lyndal Osborne, Leon Pericles, Robert Trauer. Raya Gallery, Kew
- 1982, May: 30 prints by Australian printmakers from the Carnegie collection 1945–1981 : John Brack, Barbara Brash, Les Kossatz, John Olsen, Janet Dawson, Albert Shomalyand, Graeme Peebles, Anthony Clarke. The McClelland Gallery, Langwarrin
- 1982, 21 November–12 December: Women potters and printmakers: Barbara Brash, Kim Martin, Fran Clarke, Tina Banitska, Dianne Mangan, Yvonne Boag, Noela Hjorth, Mary McQueen. Golden Age Galleries
- 1983, August: Artists include Barbara Brash, Clifton Pugh, Yvonne Ricketts, Howard Sparks and Paul Margocsy. Artist Proof Galleries, 108 Punt Rd., Windsor
- 1984, April: 51 Victorian Artists mark the 50th Anniversary of the City of Heidelberg, Victorian Artists Society, East Melbourne
- 1984, 20 May–6 June: Original prints by Barbara Brash, Maadi Einfeld, Janette Faircloth, Robert Grieve, Leslie Sprague. Leveson Gallery, 130 Faraday St, Carlton
- 1987, November: Limited edition prints by Charles Blackman, Clifton Pugh, Jamie Boyd, Barbara Brash and others. Artist Proof, 108 Punt Rd, Windsor
- 1989, from 19 April: Group exhibition of important modern painters from the 1930s to the present day: Norman Albiston, Valerie Albiston, Ian Armstrong, Yvonne Atkinson, George Bell, Meg Benwell, Barbara Brash, Dorothy Braund, Rod Clarke, Yvonne Cohen, Jack Courier, Frances Derham, Russell Drysdale, Anne Graham, Geoff Jones, Grahame King, Bernard Lawson, Evelyn McCutcheon, Maidi McGowan, Mary MacQueen, Guelda Pyke, Harry Rosengrave, Dorothy Stephen, June Stephenson, Constance Stokes, Eric Thake, Edith Wall. Eastgate Gallery
- 1990, August: Works by George Bell, Constance Stokes, Alan Warren, Ian Armstrong, Geoff Jones, Dorothy Braund, Barbara Brash, Jack Courier, Percy Watson, Guelda Pyke, William Gleeson, Jeremy Barrett. Eastgate Gallery 729 High Street, Armadale
- 1991, June: Eastgate Gallery, 729, High St., Armadale
- 1991, from 28 November: Works On Paper: Ian Armstrong, George Bell, Barbara Brash, Dorothy Braund, Nutter Buzzacott, Jack Courier, Arch Cuthbertson, William Gleeson, Mary Hammond, Geoff Jones, Grahame King, Mary MacQueen, lain MacNab, Anne Montgomery, Guelda Pyke, Constance Stokes, Alan Sumner, Eveline Syme, Alan Warren, Percy Watson, Fred Williams. Eastgate Gallery 158 Burwood Rd., Hawthorn
- 1992, to 3 August: Classical modernism : the George Bell Circle, National Gallery of Victoria
- 1993, 27–28 February: The Estate Of Anne Montgomery: Bernard Hall, W. Blamire Young, Charles Wheeler, J. Muntz-Adams, George Bell, Eveline Syme, Kenneth Jack, Jessie Traill, Len Annois, Barbara Brash, Alex Colquhoun, Edith Alsop, Lionel Lindsay, Lucy Newell, Cedric Flower, Jocelyn Priestley, T. Langlois, Anne Scott, Ron Center, Ellen Rubbo, E. M. Abeel, Margaret Pestall, Myrtle Fasken, Mary MacQueen, William Montgomery, Rosemary Thurber, and selected works by Anne Montgomery. Eastgate Gallery, 158 Burwood Rd Hawthorn
- 1993, 2–16 October: Lasssetters Gallery, Canberra
- 1996, to 26 May: Insights into Image Making : Bashir Baraki, Barbara Brash and Jean Knox, Limited edition laser copy prints and cibachrome photographs Mornington Peninsula Regional Gallery

=== Solo ===
- 1965, from 15 June: Barbara Brash screen prints and etchings. Australian Galleries, Collingwood
- 1980, July: screenprints by Barbara Brash. Works gallery, 313 Pakington St., Geelong
- 1969, June: Barbara Brash survey exhibition. Crossley Gallery, Melbourne
- 1989, 2–23 August: Barbara Brash survey exhibition Eastgate Gallery, Armadale

=== Posthumous ===
- 1991, 28 November– 18 December: Works on Paper: Ian Armstrong, George Bell, Barbara Brash, Dorothy Braund, Nutter Buzzacott, Jack Courier, Arch Cuthbertson, William Gleeson, Mary Hammond, Geoff Jones, Grahame King, Mary MacQueen, Iain MacNab, Anne Montgomery, Guelda Pyke, Constance Stokes, Alan Sumner, Eveline Syme, Alan Warren, Percy Watson, Fred Williams. Eastgate Gallery
- 1995, from 30 April: Collector's exhibition: Mary Cecil Allen, Len Annois, George Bell, Barbara Brash, Dorothy Braund, Lina Bryans, Geoff Brown, George Browning, Rupert Bunny, Maie Casey, Ron Center, Jack Courier, Peter Cox, Sybil Craig, Russell Drysdale, Raymond, Bill Gleeson, Nancy Grant, Robert Grieve, Harry de Hartog, Frank Hinder, Kenneth Hood, Roger James, Geoff Jones, Grahame King, Helen Maudsley, Anne Montgomery, Esther Paterson, Peter Purves Smith, Harry Rosengrave, Arnold Shore, Clive Stephen, Constance Stokes, Eric Thake, Louise Thomas, Isabel Tweddle, Murray Walker, Alan Warren, Fred Williams
- 2000-2001, to 14 January: Australian identities in printmaking. The Australian print collection of Wagga Wagga Art Gallery.
- 2006, 25 July 24 September: From Tuesday to Tuesday: Barbara Brash, Nancy Clifton, Mary Macqueen and Lesbia Thorpe, Mornington Peninsula Regional Gallery
- 2011, 1 June–2 July: Australian etchings featuring works from the collection of Ron Nott. Bridget McDonnell Gallery, Hampton
- 2012, 20 October–15 December: LOOK. LOOK AGAIN, survey exhibition of historic and contemporary works of art made by women in Australia drawn from the Cruthers Collection of Women's Art. Lawrence Wilson Art Gallery, UWA
- 2022, 25 June – 9 October: Barbara Brash—Holding Form, Geelong Art Gallery

== Publications ==
- Baraki, Bashir; Knox, Jean; Brash, Barbara (1996). Images: a selection of twelve Canon laser colour prints. Melbourne: Copier Publications. ISBN 978-0-646-27826-1. OCLC 222183970.
- Eastgate Gallery (1991). Works on paper: November 28th - December 18th 1991. Hawthorn, Vic.: Eastgate Gallery. ISBN 978-1-875517-05-3. OCLC 781543843.
- Peter Bray Gallery; Melbourne Graphic Artists (1956). Prints by the Melbourne Graphic Artists, Peter Bray Gallery, Bourke Street, 25th September till 4th October [1956. Melbourne: Peter Bray Gallery. OCLC 897205464.
- Gowing, Ainslie; Mornington Peninsula Regional Gallery (2006). From Tuesday to Tuesday: Barbara Brash, Nancy Clifton, Mary Macqueen, Lesbia Thorpe. Mornington, Vic: Mornington Peninsula Regional Gallery. ISBN 978-0-9757825-2-1. OCLC 225190077.

== Bibliography ==
- Kempf, Franz (1976). Contemporary Australian Printmakers. Melbourne: Lansdowne Editions. OCLC 470182588.
- Eagle, Mary; Minchin, Jan (1981). The George Bell School: students, friends, influences. Melbourne; Sydney: Deutscher Art; Resolution Press. ISBN 978-0-908180-05-9. OCLC 780688464.
- Peers, Juliet (1993). More than just gumtrees: a personal, social, and artistic history of the Melbourne Society of Women Painters and Sculptors. Melbourne: The Society with Dawn Revival Press. ISBN 978-0-646-16033-7. OCLC 31524737.
- Moore, Felicity St. John (1992), Classical modernism : The George Bell Circle, National Gallery of Victoria, ISBN 978-0-7241-0155-9
- Germaine, Max (1991). A dictionary of women artists of Australia. Roseville East: Craftsman House. ISBN 978-976-8097-13-2. OCLC 832428564.
