= Peter Bray Gallery =

Art gallery located in Melbourne, Australia

- Interactive map of the Peter Bray Gallery area

General information
- Location: 435 Bourke Street, Melbourne
- Coordinates: 37°48′54″S 144°57′40″E

Peter Bray Gallery (a commercial gallery) was established as Stanley Coe Gallery in 1949 before being renamed in 1951, after a change of management. Situated at 435 Bourke Street, Melbourne, Victoria, Australia, it closed in 1957. Many of the major names in mid-century Australian contemporary art showed there during its brief, but very busy, lifespan.

== Directors ==
The director/curators were Helen Ogilvie (from 1949 to 1955) and Ruth McNicoll (from Sept 1956 to close). The gallery was owned by Peter Bray, whose interest was in exhibiting pictures and retailing contemporary furniture by Grant Featherston, as it was not unusual in the 1950s to combine the two retail lines into one establishment

== Artists ==
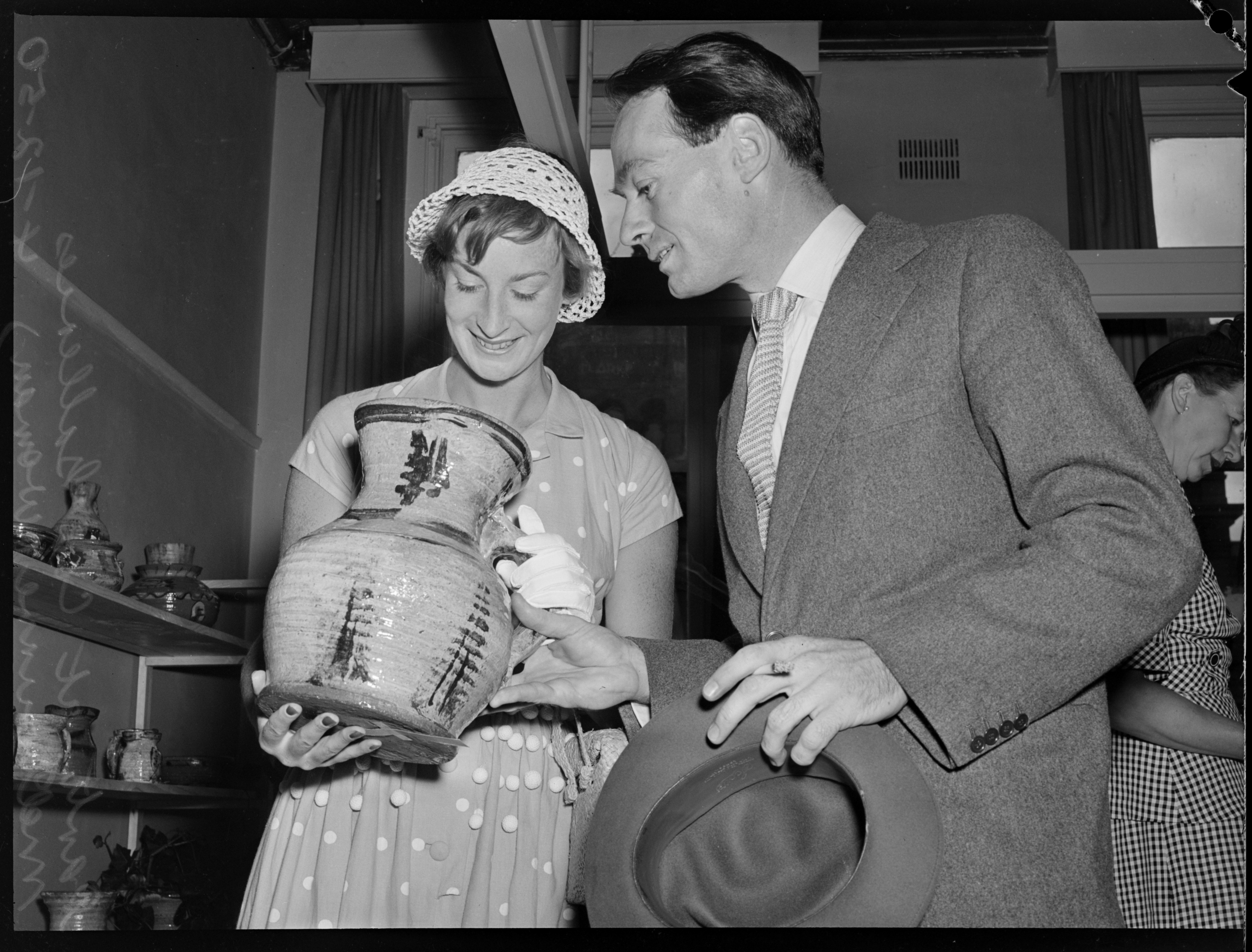
Gordon De Lisle, Couple photographed at exhibition opening at Stanley Coe Gallery, 4 December 1950

Brita Sievers with her ceramics and paintings by Elma Amor at Peter Bray Art Gallery, Bourke Street, Melbourne, Victoria, 1957. Photo: Wolfgang Sievers and Peter Bray Gallery. From the State Library of Victoria.

Originally Stanley Coe Gallery, established in 1949, and taken over by Peter Bray the following year, Peter Bray Gallery showed Australian paintings, sculpture and prints by significant contemporary artists.

Printmaker/painter Helen Ogilvie (1902–1993) was a generous mentor of emerging artists, and in 1949 Stanley Coe appointed her as one of Australia's first women gallery directors to create a commercial exhibition space on the upper floor of his interior design shop at 435 Bourke Street, Melbourne, decorated with pale grey-blue walls and hair-cord carpet. Artist Tate Adams dubbed it "the lone beacon in town for contemporary art". For the period until 1955, and with advice from her friends Ursula Hoff, Arnold Shore and Alan McCulloch, she organised a program of exhibitions of the avant-garde; John Brack who first exhibited there 27 October – November 1953, again in 1955, then first showed his Racecourse series 5–15 November 1956 and in the same year the gallery sold his most famous work Collins Street, 5 pm to the National Gallery of Victoria.

Also exhibited there were Margo Lewers, Ian Fairweather (23 April – 3 May 1956), Leonard French (who showed his Illiad series, amongst his earliest experiments with enamel house paint on Masonite, October 1952), Inge King, Arthur Boyd (15–24 September 1953), Charles Blackman, Ludwig Hirschfeld Mack (whose first Australian show in a commercial gallery was there in 1953), Helen Maudsley, Sydney Nolan, Clifton Pugh, Michael Shannon, Guy Grey-Smith, David Dalgarno, Ian Armstrong and others.

"Collins Street was exhibited at the same gallery in March 1956 and was immediately purchased by the National Gallery of Victoria (NGV)."

Charles Blackman unveiled his radical series of schoolgirl paintings at the Peter Bray Gallery in May 1953, establishing his reputation in a decade in which he invented the themes that defined his career. Abstract sculptor Lenton Parr, returning to the country after working as assistant to Henry Moore, held his first Australian exhibition at the gallery in 1957, the same year that Arthur Boyd showed his figurative ceramic sculptures there. Ogilvie, Modernist printmaker, painter and craftsperson in her own right, was engaged with the Crafts Revival of the 1950s and 60s, and made a living designing cutting edge lampshades in London for a period.

== Exhibitions ==
Commercially printed lithographic poster by David Dalgarno for a group exhibition of prints by Melbourne artists, Peter Bray Gallery in 1956.

Exhibitions at the gallery turned around regularly and were only a week or week-and-a-half in duration. Interspersed with the one-person shows mentioned above were group shows by artists in a particular medium, or by artist groups and societies.

- 1951, from 1 November: Inge King, Grahame King
- 1952, April: Francis Lymburner
- 1952, 22 Apr–1 May: Phyl Waterhouse, European and Indian landscapes
- 1952, from 2 May: Allan David
- 1952, 12 May: Paintings and drawings by Charles Blackman.
- 1952, October: Len French
- 1952, October: Inge King Constructions in Steel, Graham King, paintings
- 1953: John Rogers paintings
- 1953, 1 February: Multi-artist exhibition, including season. Roger Kemp, Charles Blackman and Leonard French
- 1953: 23 June – 1 July: Drought paintings by Sidney Nolan.
- 1953 Paintings by Eric Smith
- 1953: Ludwig Hirschfeld Mack.
- 1953, 15–24 September: Arthur Boyd
- 1953, 27 October – 5 November: Paintings and Drawings by John Brack.
- 1953 Paintings by artists living in Melbourne, Charles Blackman, Arthur Boyd, John Brack, Dorothy Braund, Leonard French, Roger Kemp, Graeme King, Michael Shannon, Eric Thake, Alan Warren.
- 1954: Margo Lewers
- 1954: Painting by the Adelaide 1954 Group, Michael Brous, Pamel Cleland, Ludvik Dutkiewicz, Wladyslaw Dutkiewicz, Ivor Francis, Jacqueline Hick, I. Rapotec, Douglas Roberts, Barbara Robertson, Francis Roy Thompson, Mervyn Ashmore Smith.
- 1954, 1 February: Nine artists. Prints
- 1955: 40 prints by ten artists. Tate Adams, Geoff Barwell, Barbara Brash, David Allen, Walter Gherdin, F. Higgs, Kenneth Hood, Kenneth Jack, Jennifer Purnell, Harry Rosengrave.
- 1955: 8 March – 17 March: John Brack.
- 1955, 20 May – 20 June: Thirty-six prints by twelve Melbourne artists. Travelling
- 1955, June: Margaret Bembina, Eric Smith, Charles Blackman, Clifton Pugh
- 1956: Drawings and Prints - Melbourne contemporary artists. Dorothy Baker, George Bell, Barbara Brash, R.A. Center, William (Bill) Coleman, Dorothea Francis, Madge Freeman, Alan Foulkes, Ann Graham, Geoff Jones, Roger Kemp, Lesley Lawson, M.E. Lormer, Harry R. Mitchell, Anne Montgomery, Marjorie North, Harry Rosengrave, Ellen Rubbo, Richard Scales, D.K. Stoner, Eveline Syme, Elvrida M Verco, Percy Watson, Marjorie Woolcock.
- 1956, 23 April – 3 May: Ian Fairweather
- 1956, 6–16 June: Guy Grey-Smith
- 1956 Helen Maudsley
- 1956 Arthur Boyd, paintings and David and Hermia Boyd ceramics
- 1956: Karin Schepers and Udo Sellbach
- 1956, 25 September – 1 November: Prints by the Melbourne Graphic Artists. Travelling
- 1956, 5 November – 11 November: John Brack: The Race Course Series. Paintings, Prints
- 1957: Exhibition of Sculpture. Anita Aarons, Ola Cohn, Clifford Last, Lenton Parr, Clement Meadmore, Andor Mészáros, Tina Wentcher, Teisutis Zikaras, Vincas Jomantas.
- 1957: Animal bird fish - paintings, drawings, prints. Douglas Annand, Margaret Bembins, J. Carrington Smith, Arthur Boyd, Dorothy Braund, John Brack, Charles Bush, Raymond Glass, Robert Grieve, Eileen Mayo, Anne Montgomery, Guelda Pyke, Eric Smith, Edith Wall.
- 1957, 19 March – 28 March: Jack Courier, paintings, drawings, lithographs.
- 1957: Elma Amor, paintings and Brita Sievers, ceramics
