= Yvonne Boag =

Australian artist

- Born: 13 August 1954 (age 72); Glasgow, Scotland
- Education: South Australian School of Art and Monash University
- Known for: Painting, Printmaking, Sculpture, Mixed Media, Artist Books

Yvonne Boag (born 13 August 1954) is an Australian painter and printmaker whose work reflects the many places where she has lived and worked.

== Biography and education ==
Boag was born in Glasgow in Scotland, and emigrated with her family to Australia in 1964. They settled in the remote industrial city of Port Pirie where she attended Port Pirie High School. Her art teacher, the ceramicist, Petrus Spronk, encouraged her to apply for entry to the South Australian School of Art in Adelaide. There she specialised in printmaking under Franz Kempf, graduating in 1976. In 1977 she moved to Melbourne where, at the Royal Melbourne Institute of Technology she was able to work alongside an outstanding generation of printmakers including George Baldessin, Tate Adams and John Loane, along with Neil Leveson at the Victorian (now Australian) Print Workshop.

In 1985, Boag moved to Sydney, where she exhibited with Australian Galleries and taught at the National Art School, Sydney College of the Arts, Western Sydney University and the College of Fine Arts. During the 1990s she conducted annual printmaking workshops at the remote Aboriginal community of Lockhart River in northern Queensland. She also worked and travelled extensively. She was artist-in-residence at the Aberdeen Art Gallery in Scotland, spent five years in Paris (including a residency at the Moya Dyring Studio in the Cité internationale des arts), worked in the Scuola Internazionale di Graphica in Venice, and was awarded the Australia Council's Japan Residency in 1998, having been Asialink's inaugural artist-in-residence in Seoul, South Korea in 1995. Since then she has regularly spent months at a time in South Korea teaching, exhibiting and consulting. She now divides her time between Seoul and Sydney.

== Work ==
Living in different cultural contexts has led to the artist's preoccupation with displacement. The work becomes a response to Boag's own response to her new surroundings. Images are reduced to semi-abstract forms that combine areas of colour with line. The results are strong graphic forms which take on the character of signs. The pictures are simultaneously simple and complex. They become conversations between the artist and her context, reflecting the range of responses to being in a foreign place.

== Collections ==
- Castlemaine Art Museum
- Geelong Gallery

== Selected bibliography ==
- Acquisitions 1992, Bendigo Art Gallery, Bendigo Vic, Australia, 1992
- ArirangTV, Communicating through shapes, colors and lines in Mokpo, http://www.cultconv.com/yvonneboag/artravel2.html, 2019
- Art & Australia, September 2003
- Art World, Korea, August 1995
- Asian Art in Australia, Bright Influence, in Profile Stories, https://asianartaustralia.wordpress.com, 27 April 2012
- Catalogue, 2eme Salon Cimaise, Dinan, France, 1993
- Catalogue, Discovery New Asia, Chung Ju Korea, 1993
- Chosun Ilbo, South Korea, May 1995
- Chung Chong Daily News, Korea, May 1995
- Cross, E., Exhibition Review, The Age, 22 February 1989
- Directory of Australian Printmakers 1982-1989, Print Council of Australia
- Douglas B, An Aboriginal exhibition of awakening, https://issuu.com/first_nations_telegraph/docs/an_aboriginal_exhibition_of_awakeni, January 2015
- Drury, N., Images 2 Contemporary Australian Painting, Craftsman House, 1994
- Exhibition: Yvonne Boag "Strange Associations". IY archives: interview (2013, http://illustrateyourself.com/news/entry/exhibition-yvonne-boag-strange-associations-2015, 2015
- Frost A, The uncanny and Changwon Sculpture Biennale, https://theconversation.com/the-uncanny-and-changwon-sculpture-biennale-66136, 2016
- Germaine, Max, Directory of Australian Artists
- Graven Images in the Promised Land, Art Gallery of South Australia, 1981
- Grishin S, Yvonne Boag s Here and There at Nancy Sever Gallery in Canberra a sensual exploration of Korea, http://www.canberratimes.com.au/act-news/canberra-life/yvonne-boags-here-and-there-at-nancy-sever-gallery-in-canberra-a-sensual-exploration-of-korea-20160901-gr6e6t.html, September 2016
- Grishin, S. (Ed), Australian Printmaking in the 1990s, Craftsman House, 1996
- Hankook Ilbo, South Korea, June 1995
- Kang Chul-Son's Cultural Journey to Australia, Korean Broadcasting Service, broadcast in June, 1996
- Korean Eyesed Exhibition Review (in Korean), http://www.ohmynews.com/NWS_Web/View/at_pg.aspx?CNTN_CD=A0000232240
- Korean Times, Korea, May 1995
- Korean-eyesed, Kwanhoon Gallery, Seoul Indesign, March 2003-12-08
- MBC, Radio Interview, 1800hrs, 27 May 1995
- McGillick, Paul, A voice of her own, Art & Australia Spring Vol 41 No. 1 2003
- New Art 3, Craftsman House Press 1989
- Petit Presse à Poing, Imprint Magazine, Vol 28, No. 1, 1993
- Point & Marge, Imprint Magazine, Vol 28, No. 3, 1993
- Scottish Painters in Australia Catalogue, Castlemaine Art Museum, Castlemaine Vic, Australia
- Watson, B. (3 September 2016). "Artist Yvonne Boag finds inspiration in South Korea". The Australian.
