= Dorothy Mary Braund =

Australian artist (1926–2013)

Dorothy Mary Braund (1926–2013) was an Australian post-war figuration and contemporary feminist artist, whose practice included painting, printmaking and teaching. Braund's extensive career was instrumental in contributing to the Modernist art scene, along with a generation of significant women artists including: Mary Macqueen, Barbara Brash, Anne Marie Graham, Constance Stokes, Anne Montgomery (artist) and Nancy Grant. Braund's first solo exhibition, held in 1952 at Peter Bray Gallery in Melbourne, launched her career and from then on she had consistent shows and exhibitions. Braund has had approximately 29 solo exhibitions and participated in 25 group exhibitions throughout her career. Braund is also a part of the Cruthers Collection of Women's Art.

== Early life ==
Dorothy Braund was born in Malvern, Victoria on 15 November 1926. Braund was the only child of Mr and Mrs Gordon Braund. As an infant she made marks with a gold bangle in overlapping rhythms making large circular patterns on the white kalsomined wall next to her cot. Braund's parents encouraged her love for drawing as a child and often presented her with drawing and painting implements and paper for her to doodle on.

At school, Braund won both the Art and Sewing Prizes two or three years in a row. Braund discovered a magazine photograph of an American sculpture of a woman washing her hair, which she cut out and stuck in her homework book as the first influence of complete simplicity. The figure was almost portrayed as one arch and was perfectly explained to Braund.

== Education ==
Braund was educated in Malvern at St Margaret's School, Melbourne from 1933 to 1940 and then Lauriston Girls' School from 1941 to 1943. The painter Louise Fairley, a friend of her aunt Isabel Tweedle, recommended that Braund attend The George Bell School in 1943 to study art. However, George Bell thought it was more suitable that she enrolled at the National Gallery of Victoria Art School, as she was so young at 17.

In the meantime, she began studies at RMIT in 1944. Braund found the industrial design, lettering, clay modelling and drawing in the course too complex. From 1945 to 1949 Braund studied at the National Gallery School under the instructors William Dargie, Murray Griffin and Alan Sumner. During this time, Braund's cohort were invited to choose their teacher and Braund chose Sumner who taught the modernists. The analytical approach taught by the Gallery school helped her find her simplistic painting style. Whilst here she won prizes for drawing the figure and still-life painting.

Her efforts enabled her to be chosen by Sumner who sent Braund and other students to the George Bell School for extra study and to learn to draw quickly. The school proved a major influence in her work. Her formal classes with Bell ended in 1949 Braund also subsequently studied in England from 1950 to 1951.

== Involvements ==
Braund met John Reed, who she fell for, when she visited the Contemporary Art Society Exhibition. She describes Reed as an 'interesting looking man' who was sitting crunched at the desk eating grapes. She signed up that day to join the Contemporary Art Society.

While studying at the National Gallery School, Braund and another student named Judy Hunter exhibited modernist works in 1943 with the Contemporary Art Society (CAS). However, CAS confronted them following the report in Truth that they had entered the works as a joke, resulting in a threat of eviction. Braund apologised and continued to exhibit with CAS, whereas Hunter refused to apologise and resorted to legal advice to help deal with the situation.

Braund re-joined the Contemporary Art Society in 1952, where she became a regular 'Thursday night' participant at George Bell Studio from 1954. She was a supporter of Bell's teaching ideas at the studio and some of his former pupils went to her for lessons after Bell's death in 1966. Bell wrote to Braund before he died: 'On your kind will depend the carrying on of Art in this country.' George Bell appreciated her ability to use form, colour and surface to create good pictorial design.

In 1954 Braund created the Young Women's Christian Association (YWCA) Christmas card design.

Braund also gave talks on ABC Radio from 1961 to 1964, and reviewed children's books for The Australian newspaper from 1969 to 1977.

== Teaching ==
Braund taught art at three Melbourne schools in the 1950s. From 1952 she taught two to four days each week at Lauriston Girls' School, Malvern. In 1955, she was selected as "Art Mistress" at St Catherine's School in Malvern. At Rossbourne House in Hawthorn, Braund taught disabled children.

== Travels ==
She travelled internationally in the 1950s and 60s, across Europe in 1950–51, Italy and Greece in 1958, as well as Pakistan, Persia, Turkey, India and Asia. Braund hitchhiked in England and the rest of the continent, where she explored sights and galleries. She spent time in London with fellow Australian artists Michael Shannon and John Rogers in 1951. In 1958 she visited George Johnston and Charmian Clift and their three children on Hydra. Upon seeing the works of her favourite artists, Georges Seurat and Piero della Francesca, she found them better that she expected. She travelled to Greece three times as she was motivated by the simplicity of colour and shapes, finding it the perfect setting for her painting style.

In 1961 she again left Melbourne, this time with Guelda Pyke. They travelled on a freighter Chadraka and took a Kombi van on board, subsequently driving from Karachi through Pakistan, Iran and Turkey. They met fellow artist Nancy Grant on their travels. In 1962 she returned to Australia. The sights and experiences of Braund's extensive journeys greatly inspired her works.

Braund's residence changed multiple times over the years; she lived in Asia, India, Greece, England and Australia. In 1989, she moved from her family home at Sorret Avenue, Malvern to a cliff-top retreat at Mornington.

== Art practice ==
Braund aimed to achieve ultimate simplicity in her work which is flat, carefully designed and small scaled. She worked in oil, Gouache or watercolour using colours of black, white, brown, grey and other tertiary colours with neutral backgrounds. These delicate colours evoke Italian Fresco paintings. Many of the themes in Braund's work drew on familiar everyday experiences and social activities such as public rituals of the Australian beach. Her work is either playful or gently satirical. Braund's artworks often illustrate scenes of intimate lovers, parents with children, relationships between individuals and groups expressed through articulations of form and shape of the human body.

Braund's work focused on form and design as the main expression, characterised by rhythmic line tension, close colour harmony, tone, shape and reduction of the object. She employed vertical and horizontal lines for effect and rhythm. Her works achieve total economy whilst simultaneously maintaining the essence of the subject. In the 1940s and 50s, Braund rejected the national Romanticism of Australian art and wanted to convey emotion through observation and perception of line and form and representations of the familiar and mundane. She believed the story of a painting was about creating new things. During the mid 1960s, the figures in her work became more angular and abstract.

Braund's Bali paintings were inspired by the sense of relationship, sympathy, compassion and tenderness of kids constantly with their fathers. She describes this notion as 'straight lines.' As she reflected on her oil painting 'Baby,' Braund stated, 'I find the head a bit disturbing, heads and faces are so personal that they intrude and give you a new interpretation. If you don't have faces you get the entire feeling between two bodies." She also reflected on her oil painting 'Ruffled Jumper,' 'I got sick of my boring heads which always look like eggs so to avoid the issue I put a hat on the child. I would happily paint folds in clothing until the cows come home. I find it much easier than painting flesh.'

Braund worked in Melbourne and produced many images of women during her career, as did her contemporary Joy Hester. Braund worked in her Malvern glass-walled studio with views of the sea, which she shared a love for. In 1967, she painted a portrait of Barbara Brash for the Portia Geach Memorial Award, a prize for women's portraiture. The painting was completed from familiarity with drawings of her subject, whose life and practice connected personally with her own. It is a complete likeliness of the subject, yet totally abstract when the work is turned upside-down.

Around 1972, Braund began working more often with gouache on paper, as this is a fast technique in exploring composition and aesthetic challenges.

Braund stated in 1994, "I've always been knocked out by simplicity. To me it's got such impact… far more than anything fussy… because you have to get it right. There's no chance for accidental effects. If you are simple everything has to relate and work."

== Reception ==
Braund's 'Figure composition' large scale work, painted for the National Gallery Travelling Scholarship in 1950, was regarded by the artist as a major work marking the transition from student to artist. The work recalls a sense of early Picasso in the treatment of figures and it represents the Melbourne figurative tradition.

In 1950, Braund exhibited in a group show together with 20 other painters including Alan Sumner, George Bell, William Frater, Roger Kemp, Arthur Boyd and others, at the opening of the new Stanley Coe Gallery. She was pictured in The Herald Sun with Sumner and Frater.

In 1952, she was included in the Victorian Artists Society Spring Exhibition and received a review by Alan Warren who states, "With its almost savage brightness and sound patterns, Dorothy Braund's composition shows a definite maturing of a very personal style."

In 1953, she was the only female artist in a group show of 'Ten Melbourne Artists' at the Peter Bray Gallery alongside John Brack, Charles Blackman, Roger Kemp, Leonard French, Michael Shannon, Arthur Boyd, Eric Thake, Grahame King and Alan Warren. Alan McCulloch wrote in The Herald of the 'almost purist simplicity' of Braund and other artists. Allen Warren wrote in The Age of the 'full rhythmic serenity of sculpture in her painting Girl Resting.'

The Age review for the Melbourne Contemporary Artists Group Show held in 1953, stated in 1954 that "Dorothy Braund's contributions are the work of an artist who is steadily growing in strength as her colour becomes more subdued."

In 1955 The Age review on the George Bell Group at Peter Bray Gallery commented on Braund's work, "…a joyous feminine expression."

In 1957, Arnold Shore reviewed Braund's work, "Dorothy Braund packs so much into a few simple shapes and colour tones."

In 1959, Braund was featured in an almost full page spread in The Age newspaper titled "Painter Returns…So Much to Enjoy in Greece," in which Braund shared the experience of her seven months travelling in Greece and Italy and talked about her sketch-filled note books. The article included a photo of Braund with Grecian artefacts.

In 1964 at Leveson Street Gallery, Bernard Smith reviewed Braund's work, "Lively, personal style in which a classical feeling for form is linked with a shrewd and civilised eye for the bizarre and comical" and "there are one or two paintings which are masterly in their own way."

In 1966, Braund won The Bendigo Art Prize, worth $300, with her work "Dinner Party". The judge, Brian Finemore from the National Gallery of Victoria, said that he would have bought the work for the Gallery if it had not won.

In 1992, author Christopher Heathcote stated that many artists such as Braund have been "unjustly neglected", although they came to maturity in the 1950s. Braund's career spanned six decades, and she received the approval and recognition of academia and professional critics.

== Auctions ==
Braund stated in 1979 that she was glad that "the collectors aren't interested because it means that people buy my paintings because they like them, not because they are good investments," confirming that she didn't feel undervalued as a female artist. Braund's work has been offered at auction multiple times, realising prices ranging from US$214 to US$20,935, depending on the size and medium of the artwork. On 14 and 15 August 1994, The Art Class 1960 and Bathers, Sandringham 1979, were auctioned at Christie's Sydney. Since 2007, and following the artist's death in 2013, the record price for this artist at auction is US$20,935 for John and Audrey 1956, sold at Mossgreen Auctions, Melbourne in 2014.

Market Information on Australian Art Auction Records — Dorothy Mary Braund
	Total number sold	Number with images available	Highest price	Recent average price
Paintings	123	91	A$26,840	A$5,780
Works on paper	145	112	A$7,700	A$2,057
Prints and graphics	1	1	A$216	N/A

== Exhibitions and awards ==
Braund exhibited extensively in the Eastern states and is represented in several public collections including National Gallery of Australia, Art Canberra, Art Gallery of South Australia, National Gallery of Victoria, the Queensland Art Gallery, the Cruthers Collection of Women's Art at the University of Western Australia, university galleries such as the Monash University Museum of Art, and such regional galleries as Bendigo, Castlemaine, Langwarrin, and Mornington.

Braund was awarded Prizes in competitive exhibitions at Albury 1962, Colac 1964, Bendigo 1966 and Muswellbrook 1972. Her exhibitions from the 1980s onwards, were largely with Eastgate & Holst Gallery, Melbourne. Since 1990, Jillian Holst and Rod Eastgate, who are Dealers in Fine Art, have been successful agents of Braund's.

== Solo exhibitions ==
- 1952 – First solo exhibition at Peter Bray Gallery, Melbourne, she won first prize in the City of Malvern Arts Festival
- 1955 – Peter Bray Gallery, Melbourne
- 1957 – Solo exhibition in Brisbane at the Brian Johnstone Gallery in May
- 1957 – Brummels Gallery, Melbourne
- 1960 – Solo exhibition at the Argus Gallery, Latrobe Street in August. It was opened by the Greek consul, Mr N.N.D. Coumbos and includes many gouaches of Greece.
- 1962 – Asia Minor Leveson St. Gallery
- 1964 – Solo exhibition at Leveson Street Gallery titled 'Summer '64’ receives a good review from Bernard Smith
- 1965 – Solo exhibition at Studio Nundah, Canberra. David Thomas reviews the show in the Australian
- 1967 – Solo exhibition at Leveson Street titled 'Shapes and Figures.' She receives good reviews from Alan McCulloch and Alan Warren
- 1969 – Solo exhibition of Australian Rules Football paintings
- 1970 – Exhibited in a solo show at Leveson Street Gallery including 20 small paintings. Her painting of a figure on a swing gets a review favourable from Alan Warren
- 1976 – Solo exhibition at Leveson Street titled Paintings '68-'76. The show has 41 paintings including 'Becalmed,' 'Mushrooms' and 'Boys on a Hot Day,' all favourably reviewed by Alan McCulloch
- 1977 – Working Drawings and Gouaches Leveson St Gallery
- 1977- Exhibited at Clive Parry Galleries showing the series of 17 Climbing Boys paintings
- 1979 – Solo exhibition at Leveson Street of her series of gouaches of children playing titled 'Year of the Child'
- 1981 – Ideas for Paintings – Gouaches Leveson St. Gallery
- 1983 – Fathers and Sons Jim Alexander Gallery, Melbourne
- 1983 – Swan Hill Regional Art Gallery
- 1988 – The Fun Run David Ellis Gallery, Melbourne
- 1990 – Tenderness Eastgate Gallery, Melbourne
- 1992 – Greenhill Galleries, Adelaide
- 1992 – Recent paintings, Eastgate Gallery
- 1994 – Survey Exhibition 1949-1974 Eastgate Gallery
- 1995 – Recent Paintings 1992-1995 Eastgate Gallery
- 1996 – Dorothy Braund – Creative Insights McClelland Gallery, Langwarrin
- 1998 – Recent Paintings 1995-1998 Eastgate Gallery
- 1998 – Greenhill Galleries, Adelaide
- 1998 – Gregson Flanagan Gallery, Perth
- 2000 – Recent works Eastgate Gallery
- 2002 – Recent Paintings Eastgate Gallery
- 2004 – Selected Gouaches 1955-1989 Eastgate & Holst Gallery, Melbourne

== Group exhibitions ==
- 1943
  - Contemporary Art Society
- 1950
  - with 20 other painters: Alan Sumner, George Bell, William Frater, Roger Kemp, Arthur Boyd and others, at the opening of the new Stanley Coe Gallery.
- 1952
  - Stanley Coe Gallery
  - with Michael Shannon at the Peter Bray Gallery in July for which they both gain press coverage and successful reviews on their work. Victorian Artists Society Spring Exhibition and received a good review by Alan Warren
- 1953
  - 'Ten Melbourne Artists' at the Peter Bray Gallery alongside John Brack, Charles Blackman, Roger Kemp, Leonard French, Michael Shannon, Arthur Boyd, Eric Thake, Graeme King and Alan Warren.
  - 1953
  - with William Frater and Arnold Shore at the Victorian Artists' Society
  - with the George Bell group for the first time at the Peter Bray Gallery
- 1954
  - 'Nine Victorian Artists' at Peter Bay Gallery along with Blackman, Brack, Shannon, and the then director of the gallery Helen Ogilvie and others. This show is opened by National Gallery of Victoria print room curator Ursula Hoff.
  - other group shows at Peter Bray this year and her work is hung and reviewed along aide Donald Friend among others.
  - painting 'Boy on a Bicycle' in contemporary artist exhibition at the Balaclava Hotel in Carlisle Street Balaclava
- 1955: George Bell Group show at the Royal Society of Arts of South Australia Adelaide
- 1957:
  - March: 'Eight Melbourne Artists' exhibition Wellington New Zealand in March. The other artists were: Arthur Boyd, John Brack, Clifton Pugh, John Rogers, Clive Stephen, Constance Strokes and Teisutis Zikaras. toured Auckland, Hamilton, Napier and Nelson. The exhibition received good views and many of the paintings were soldBrummell's Gallery with William Dobell, Michael Shannon, John Brack, Clifton Pugh and others. The show received good reviews from the then art critic Alan Warren and also Arnold Shore.
  - Argus Gallery with the Melbourne Contemporary Artists group.
  - Leveson Street Gallery, North Melbourne. The directors are Charles Bush, Phyl Waterhouse and June Davies.
  - Porticello Harbour in Perth Prize at the Western Australia Art Gallery. She does not win but receives a mention on the Sunday Times.
- 1970
  - Leveson Street Gallery
- 1981
  - gouaches 'Ideas of Paintings' at Leveson Galleries in its new location of 130 Faraday Street, Carlton
- 1983
  - Swan Hill Regional Art Gallery
  - Jim Alexander Gallery, East Malvern, showing 15 large oil paintings from the Fathers and Sons series
- 1988
  - Davis Ellis Gallery, Melbourne showing The Fun Run series
- 1990
  - Eastgate Gallery showing the Tenderness paintings
- 1992
  - 'Classical Modernism: The George Bell Circle' at the National Gallery of Victoria
- 1991
  - 'Works on Paper' at Eastgate Gallery showing 'Waiting,' 'Teenagers' and 'Beach Café IV' which all sold.
- 1996
  - at McClelland Gallery 'Creative Insight'
- 2004
  - Site+Vision: La Trobe University Art Collection Bundoora Homestead Art Centre, Melbourne
- 2023
  - Crossing Paths: Women Supporting Women, Mornington Peninsula Regional Gallery (MPRG), showing the connections with four other women artists in the MPRG collection - Guilda Pyke, Nancy Grant and Barbara Brash

== Awards ==
- 1952 – Awarded first prize in the City of Malvern Arts Festival
- 1956 – Awarded the Malvern Centenary Art Award
- 1962 – Awarded the Albury Art Prize worth 150 pounds, in competitive exhibition for "Greek Island" painting
- 1964 – Awarded the Colac Art Prize worth 100 guineas, in competitive exhibition with a beach figures composition
- 1966 – Awarded the Bendigo Art Prize of $300 in competitive exhibition with "Dinner Party"
- 1972 – Awarded the Muswellbrook Prize in competitive exhibition for her work 'Climbing Trees'

== Represented ==
- Australian National Gallery
- National Gallery of Victoria
- Bendigo Art Gallery
- Albury Art Gallery
- Muswellbrook Art Gallery
- McLelland Gallery Langwarrin
- Mornington Peninsula Regional Gallery
- Monash University Collection
- La Trobe University Collection

The Mornington Peninsula Regional Gallery received 44 of Braund's works through the artist's estate in 2010, among them the Bathers series.
