= Harold Freedman =

Australian artist and official war artist

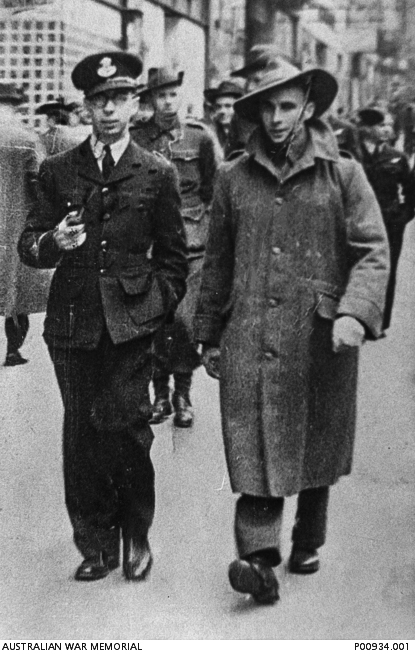
Australian War Artist Harold Freedman (left) in Collins Street Melbourne with his brother, c. 1943. Courtesy Australian War Memorial

Harold Emanuel Freedman O.A.M. (21 May 1915 – 16 July 1999) was an artist from Victoria, Australia, renowned as an illustrator and lithographer, as an official war artist, and for his work in public murals.

== Early life ==
Harold Freedman's father Julius was born in Bristol, England, and migrated with his parents at four years old to Australia where they lived in Carlton. There Harold Freeman's grandfather started a small picture-frame factory. Julius married Miriam (née Hyams) and Harold was born in Ewart St., Malvern on 21 May 1915.

== Training ==
Harold Freedman studied at Caulfield Technical College and took extra tuition from Napier Waller, then furthered his education at the Melbourne Technical College from 1929 to 1935. In 1936 he worked as a freelance illustrator and cartoonist for Melbourne weeklies; His ink cartoon Calvalcade of Billy 1940, is in the State Library of Victoria, donated by the artist.

== War artist ==
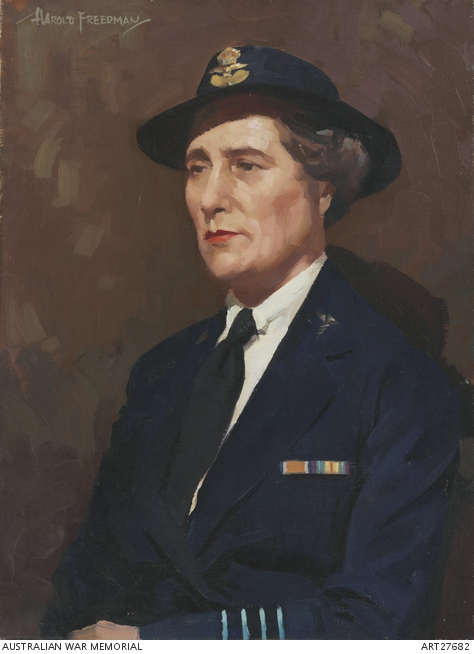
Matron Margaret Irene Lang in 1943 by Freedman

During World War II, Freedman enlisted in the Royal Australian Air Force, becoming a war artist attached to the Royal Australian Air Force Historical War Records Section, along with Ivor Hele, Eric Thake and Max Newton. He attained the rank of flight lieutenant. He was able to work as a war artist in 1944 and 1945, in Borneo, Noemfoor and around Australia. His work also featured on magazine covers like New Idea magazine in the 1940s.

== Post-war ==
In 1954, while living in Boronia, he was commissioned to produce a painting of the coat of arms of Victoria as the backdrop for the state dinner with Queen Elizabeth II on her visit to Australia.

In his role from 1972 to 1983 as the state artist of Victoria he created a number of wall murals and floor mosaics in public buildings. Many are of massive scale; his History of Military Aviation mural at the War Memorial in Canberra is 60 × 4.5 m; the History of Transport in Australia mural at Southern Cross station (then Spencer St. railway station) was 36 × 7.3 m, and one, a mosaic covering an external wall of the Metropolitan Fire Brigade in Melbourne is 25 m in height. He and his assistants, artists Joe Attard and David Jack, aided by calligraphist Bruce Walker, commenced The History of Racing in 1984, a series of seven 10 × 6 m murals, completed in time for the Australian Bicentenary.

Saddened when the state artist appointment was discontinued in 1983 under John Cain's Victorian Labor government, Freedman reflected;

They're not into what they call "elitist art", (the) art of professionalism. They're interested in people "doing it themselves", so you get no degree of excellence. ... they are really interested in the clinical communication in art. They are more into propaganda than art, which is very sad — because all they will get is amateurish, second-rate material. They want art to come down to the level of the average, which is very, very short-sighted.

When Spencer Street Station underwent radical redevelopment (2002–2006) and was renamed Southern Cross, Freedman's History of Transport in Australia above the passenger waiting hall was removed, but due to bargaining by the CFMEU, it remains on display above shop-fronts in the adjacent retail centre, DFO.

== Art educator ==
As drawing master at the Melbourne Technical College Freedman was influential in his teaching.

Artist Barbara Brash remembers that in the late 1940s as head of the Commercial Art Department he invited National Gallery School students to the Melbourne Technical College to experiment in printmaking one evening a week, with no formal tuition but giving assistance and technical advice. The participants, whom he actively recruited and who included Harry Rosengrave, Fred Williams, Charles Blackman, Tate Adams, Barbara Brash, Ian Armstrong, Kenneth Jack, and Leonard French, joined his informally named Melbourne Print Group for which he "acquired" supplies that they were free to use, such as lithography stones, metal plates and ink. Kenneth Jack acknowledged that; "There is absolutely no doubt that Harold Freedman was responsible for the initiation of a great forward movement in printmaking in Australian art.

Freedman conducted The Art of the Book, a four year book design course in typography and illustration also at RMIT.

== Critical reception ==
Audiences for the exhibition, Send Me Some More Paint! at the Australian War Memorial over the first half of 1989, and then touring regional and capital cities, were surveyed by a marketing company, and beside Stella Bowen's Hallifax Crew, William Dobell's Billy Boy, Freedman's Beaufighter Pilot proved to be the most popular.

Reviewing Poster Art in Australia shown at the National Gallery of Australia in 1993, Sasha Grishin in noting a flowering of Australian poster art during WW I opines that; "The next 40 years of the commercial design of posters dealing with tourism, public transport, commercial advertising and issues thrown up by World War II were dominated by a number of competent, but not particularly exciting artists" amongst whom he includes Freedman, and concludes that "these posters are more of interest as social documents than as art objects.

Harold Freedman: The Big Picture, published for the artist's posthumous Ballarat exhibition of 2017, records that "While some of his contemporaries, notably Sidney Nolan and Albert Tucker, were also grafting away in commercial studios, Freedman enjoyed the challenge and made it central to his work, rather than seeing it as some irksome task."

Art historian Victoria Perin, who notes she was once a guide at the Australian War Memorial, and reviewing the same 2017 exhibition, writes of Freedman's official war art;

His military sitters invariably exhibit a furrowed and intelligent seriousness. Like Ivor Hele, his colleague in the Army, Freedman was an exceptional flatterer of male faces. Absent from the exhibition, although in the catalogue, is Freedman portrait of a favourite Victoria Cross recipient, Pilot Officer Rawdon Middleton. After his cock-pit was fired upon over Italy, Middleton flew his damaged bomber over the Channel so that his crew could safely bail out close to the English shore. Middleton was grievously injured – his eye was hanging from its socket, his jaw was shattered – and the journey back to England took four agonising hours. As the plane could not land, once everyone else evacuated the pilot crashed it into the sea. The posthumous portrait is appropriately ghostly, painted from a second-hand sketch it is hazy and undefined. Yet again it features that intelligent, handsome stare. The face Freedman gave his decorated sitters was always intensely dignified, but he always gave them the same face.

== Legacy ==
In 1987 Freedman suffered a stroke which adversely affected his health. He died on 16 July 1999 aged 84.

In 2015 the artist's son David Freedman donated to the Art Gallery of Ballarat 31 works including a pastel portrait of Alan Marshall, other pastel, ink and pencil drawings, a gouache painting, posters and lithographs under the Government's Cultural Gifts Program. Ballarat in 2017 also acquired with funds from the Joe White Bequest Freedman's 45.5 × 61.4 cm lithographic poster Destroy Rats. Rats Destroy (1950s).

== Exhibitions ==
- 1989: Send Me Some More Paint! survey of war art at the Australian War Memorial, then touring regional and capital cities
- 1993: Poster Art in Australia, group survey at National Gallery of Australia
- 1999: Follow the Sun: Australian Travel Posters 1930s-1950s, National Library of Australia, Canberra, ACT
- 2017, 31 March – 28 May: Harold Freedman: Artist for the People, posthumous retrospective, Ian Potter Foundation Gallery, Art Gallery of Ballarat, curated by Julie McLaren.

== Collections ==
Collections include:

- Ballarat Art Gallery
- Australian War Memorial, Canberra
- RAAF Museum, Point Cook
- State Library of Victoria
- National Gallery of Victoria

== Murals ==
- Australian War Memorial; History of Military Aviation
- Melbourne Airport's international terminal (1971 – History of Flight – variously-sized paintings with wing-like sculptural surrounds by Geoffrey Wilkinson)
- Spencer Street station: Cavalcade of Transport
- Geelong Government Offices: Regional History of Geelong
- Eastern Hill Fire Brigade Headquarters; The Legend of Fire (1980-1982)
- Waverley Park (1986); VFL Legends
- Flemington Racecourse (1988); History of Australian Thoroughbred Racing

== Honours ==
- Medal of the Order of Australia (1989)
- State Artist of Victoria (1972–83); the only person ever so honoured

== Publications illustrated by ==
- Boyd, Robin; Freedman, Harold (1966). The book of Canberra, Australia's national capital: a collection of three lithographic prints of Canberra drawn in 1965 by Harold Freedman compared with reproductions of early paintings of the site on which Canberra now stands. Adelaide: Griffin Press. OCLC 220071975.
- Freedman, Harold; Victoria; Education Department (1960s). Among friends: the Victorian readers third book. Melbourne: Education Dept. of Victoria. OCLC 219963491.
- Freedman, Harold; Victoria Racing Club (2000s). The history of racing: the first of seven panels, being a mural commissioned by the Victoria Racing Club and painted by Hardold Freedman. Melbourne: Classic Reproductions. OCLC 741792463.
- Freedman, Harold; Mellor, Kathleen (1950s). Splish-splash rainy day. Melbourne: Georgian House. OCLC 221820852.
- Jillett, Leslie (1945), Moresby's few: being an account of the activities of No. 32 Squadron in New Guinea in 1942, North Western Courier
- James, Walter; Freedman, Harold, 1915-1999 (1951), Barrel and book: a winemakers' diary, Georgian House
- Nicolson, T; Freedman, Harold, 1915-1999 (1948), Caskie woods, Georgian House
- Mellor, Kathleen (1952), Pine farm: to all children who like holidays, Georgian House
- Mellor, Kathleen; Freedman, Harold, (illustrator.) (1952), Goldy, Georgian House
- Moodie Heddle, Enid, 1904-, (editor.) (1953), Near and far, Longmans
- Freedman, Harold, 1915-1999; Moodie Heddle, Enid, 1904- (1953), New and old, Longmans Green
- Heddle, Enid Moodie (1968), Story of a vineyard: Chateau Tahbilk (new ed.), Hawthorn Pr
- James, Walter; Freedman, Harold, 1915-1999 (1955), The gadding vine, Georgian House
- Freedman, Harold (1980). A regional history: the story told in glass: State Government Offices, Geelong. Geelong: State Government Offices. OCLC 220929668.
- James, Walter; Freedman, Harold, 1915-1999; James, Walter. Barrel and book; James, Walter. Nuts on wine (1974), The Bedside Book of Australian Wine: An Australian Winemaker's Diary, Rigby, ISBN 978-0-85179-513-3
- Moodie Heddle, Enid; Moodie Heddle, Enid, 1904-; Freedman, Harold, 1915-1999 (1953), Here and there, Longmans Green
- Mellor, Kathleen; Freedman, Harold, 1915-1999 (1952), Over the hill, Georgian House
- James, Walter; Freedman, Harold, 1915-1999 (1950), Nuts on wine, Georgian House
- Freedman, Harold; Lemon, Andrew, 1949- (1990), The history of Australian thoroughbred racing. Volume 2, The golden years - from 1862 to 1939, Southbank Communications, ISBN 978-0-949318-06-0
- Moodie Heddle, Enid, 1904-; Freedman, Harold, 1915-1999 (1952), Girdle round the world, Longmans
- James, Walter; Freedman, Harold, 1915-1999 (1960), Wine: A Brief Encyclopedia, Alfred A. Knopf
- James, Walter; Freedman, Harold, 1915-1999, (illustrator.) (1949), Barrel and Book: A Winemaker's Diary, Georgian House
- Palmer, Helen G. (Helen Gwynneth); Freedman, Harold, 1915-1999; MacLeod, Jessie, 1909-1996 (1954), The first hundred years, Longmans, Green
- Moodie Heddle, Enid; Freedman, Harold, 1915-1999; Doherty, Frank, 1916-; Moodie Heddle, Enid, 1904 (1985), Chateau Tahbilk: Story of a Vineyard 1860-1985 (1985 ed.), Lothian, ISBN 978-0-85091-236-4
- Brookes, Mabel Emmerton, Dame; Freedman, Harold, 1915-1999 (1967), Riders of time, Macmillan of Australia
- Moodie Heddle, Enid, 1904-; Freedman, Harold, 1915-1999; South Australia. Primary Schools Advisory Curriculum Board (1952), The boomerang books, Longmans

== Publications about ==
- Fry, Gavin; Freedman, David; Jack, David (2017). Harold Freedman, the big picture. Melbourne Mural Studio P/L. ISBN 978-0-9875351-5-3. OCLC 971612410.
- Hetherington, Michelle; National Library of Australia (2001). Follow the sun: Australian travel posters 1930's -1950's. Canberra: National Library of Australia. ISBN 978-0-642-10742-8. OCLC 62544898.
- Brandon, Laura, 1951-, (author.); Stanley, Peter, 1956-, (author.); Tolson, Roger, (author.); Wilkins, Lola, (author.); Imperial War Museum (Great Britain), (host institution.); Australian War Memorial, (host institution.); Canadian War Museum, (host institution.) (2005), Shared experience: art & war: Australia, Britain & Canada in the Second World War, Australian War Memorial, ISBN 978-0-9751904-2-5
