= Hertha Kluge-Pott =

German-born Australian printmaker (1934–2025)

Hertha Kluge-Pott (16 December 1934 – 9 June 2025) was a German-born Australian printmaker based in Melbourne.

== Early life and education ==
Hertha Kluge-Pott was born in Berlin on 16 December 1934, into an upper-middle-class German family and studied at the Hochschule für Bildende Künste and Braunschweig from 1953 to 1958, where she knew Günter Grass, who was studying graphics and was the student representative.

== Australia ==
Against her family's wishes Kluge-Pott migrated from Hamburg to Australia in 1958, aged 23, having graduated and after the death of her father. The ship on which she was traveling, the Skaubryn, caught fire on 1 April 1958, three days out of Colombo on the way to Perth, and passengers evacuated in life boats, watching as it burned, and in her case, with all her possessions. A cargo ship transferred them to another before their arrival on a Dutch vessel, which sank some time later. Recounting the adventure in a 1988 interview, Kluge-Pott recalled; "I arrived in Australia in a trance. I was 23, I had no money and no belongings. It took me a long time to find my identity in Australia."

Settling in Melbourne, she studied at RMIT from 1960 to 1963 where her work in intaglio and other techniques was recognised, with two etchings included in the important early national touring exhibition 'Australian print survey', organised by the Art Gallery of New South Wales in 1963.

== Style ==
Of Australia Kluge-Pott has said: "I think there is no other country like this. Words are too flat to describe it. It is frightening, threatening, beautiful [ ... ] I have been here for 30 years, and I know the work I do could not have been done anywhere else in the world but Terra Australis." Her favoured technique is intaglio, with added textural qualities in drypoint.

== Reception ==
Writing in 1997 of Kluge-Pott's second solo exhibition at Australian Galleries in Melbourne, Jenny Zimmer writes;

Awesome is the word that best describes Hertha Kluge-Pott's recent etchings. Dark, brooding and passionate as ever, they echo oceanic moods and reverberate with the sparse coastal vegetation's harsh struggle with the elements around Cape Bridgewater and west into South Australia's sandy wind-swept Coorong. The artist, a born naturalist, enjoys a symbiotic relationship with sea and coast a union begun dramatically 40 years ago when the ship Skaubryn, on which she set out for Australia, went down in the Bay of Bengal. The prints, etchings and dry points are made with traditional methods learnt at the Berlin Academy. They can be read in numerous ways. Pages of a Survey is a series of eight small drypoints scratched directly on to the plates, probably while on field excursions. Recorded are tangled ti trees and other coastal plants grown dense and gnarled for protection against the ravages of nature. She interprets them as growing inward into complicated bundles of matter, their sturdy outline shapes darkened by detail that grows thicker and richer at each epicentre. Then she extracts a leaf, a pod, a flower or some other distinctive element and, placing it to one side, renders it precisely as if studied under a looking glass.

Robert Nelson, though recognising her skilfulness, less understands what is relayed;

Imagery of Hertha Kluge-Pott is promising, teeming with vibrant life-forms and detail. Yet ... the earnest decoction of nature in mannered arrangements doesn't succeed in communicating much about the subject matter.

== Career ==
After traveling during 1964–65 to Spain, Italy and Germany, Kluge-Pott continued a career in printmaking, as well as teaching the medium. She established a printmaking workshop at the Melbourne State College in printmaking and drawing 1968–78, with breaks to practice and study overseas at Hamburg Academy of Art and to travel in Italy and the United Kingdom 1974–75, and then lectured at RMIT 1979–92, where in 1985 she was made senior lecturer. She returned to RMIT to teach part-time 1993-4 and in 1995 at the Victorian College of the Arts, also part-time.

She held seven solo exhibitions 1972–90 in Melbourne including at Stuart Gerstman and Powell St galleries, in Brisbane, Canberra and Geelong.

Alongside Graham King, Tate Adams and Udo Sellbach, Kluge-Pott was an early and significant member of the Print Council of Australia and she participated in their touring exhibitions and other group exhibitions, including award exhibitions at Fremantle 1985–91; MPAC Spring Festival 1984, 86, 88, 90; Henri Worland, Warrnambool 1981, 87, 90, 91, 92.

She was the 1996 Judge for the Silk Cut Acquisitive Award, Melbourne, and in 2003 was appointed patron at the establishment of Portland Bay Press print workshop & studio.

== Illness and death ==
After suffering declining vision for some time, she moved into Rathdowne Place aged care facility in Carlton, Melbourne, where she died after a short illness on 6 June 2025, at the age of 90.

== Awards ==
- 1966: F.E. Richardson Print Prize, Geelong Gallery
- 1987, 1989, 1991: Henri Worland acquisitive prize, Warrnambool Art Gallery
- 1982, 1984, 1988. MPAC acquisitive
- 1990 MLC Acquisitive Art Award, Melbourne
- 1996 Daily Telegraph Mirror Acquisitive Award, University of Western Sydney, Macarthur, NSW
- 1999 Australian Paper Art Award, Melbourne

== Exhibitions ==
Solo exhibitions have included:

- 1972 Vic Langsam Galleries Melbourne
- 1978 Susan Gillespie Gallery, Canberra
- 1981 Studio One Print Workshop & Gallery, Brisbane
- 1982 Stuart Gerstman Gallery, Melbourne
- 1985 Works Gallery, Geelong, VIC
- 1987 Powell Street Graphics Gallery, Melbourne
- 1990 Powell Street Graphics Gallery, Melbourne
- 1993 Grahame Galleries + Editions, Brisbane
- 1994 Australian Galleries, Melbourne
- 1997 Australian Galleries, Melbourne
- 2001 Australian Galleries Works on Paper, Sydney
- 2005 Grahame Galleries + Editions, Brisbane
- 2005 Australian Galleries Works on Paper, Melbourne
- 2010 ‘Recent work’, Australian Galleries, Melbourne
- 2015 Australian Galleries, Derby Street, Melbourne
- 2018 ‘Recent work’, Australian Galleries, Melbourne

== Collections ==
- National Gallery of Australia
- Art Gallery of New South Wales
- Art Gallery of South Australia
- National Gallery of Victoria
- Queensland Art Gallery
- Geelong Gallery
- Newcastle Regional Art Gallery
- BHP corporate collection
- Ostrow City Museum, Poland
- Queensland University of Technology, Brisbane
- Queensland State Library - James Hardy Collection, Brisbane
- Hamilton Art Gallery, Hamilton, VIC
- Ipswich City Art Gallery, Ipswich, NSW
- Mornington Peninsula Art Centre, Mornington, VIC
- Riddoch Art Gallery, Adelaide
- University of Western Sydney, Macarthur Collection, NSW
- Wagga Wagga City Art Gallery, Wagga Wagga, NSW
- Warrnambool Art Gallery, Warrnambool, VIC
- University of Melbourne, Melbourne
- Royal Melbourne Institute of Technology, Melbourne
- Toowoomba Regional Art Gallery, NSW
- City Art Gallery, Newcastle, NSW
- City of Banyule, Melbourne
- Australian Paper Corporate Art Collection, Australia
- Artbank, Sydney
- Centre for the Artist Book Collection, Grahame Galleries & Editions, Brisbane
- City of Whitehorse, Melbourne
- Deakin University, Melbourne
- Education Department of Victoria, Melbourne
- Geelong Grammar School
- Yarra Valley School Gallery
- Methodist Ladies College, Melbourne
- Lodz, Poland: Male Formy Grafici
- Print Council of Australia, Melbourne
- Monash University Collection, Melbourne
- Australian Embassy, Singapore
- Department of Foreign Affairs, Canberra
