= Udo Sellbach =

Artist, printmaker, educator

- Born: 1927; Cologne, Germany, arrived Australia 1955
- Died: 2006 (aged 78–79); Hobart, Australia
- Known for: Printmaking, Etching, lithography

Udo Sellbach OAM (1927–2006) was a German-Australian visual artist and educator whose work focused primarily around his printmaking practice.

== History ==
Udo Sellbach was born in Cologne, Germany in 1927. Trained at Kölner Werkschulen, Cologne, Germany from 1947-1953. He arrived in Australia with his then wife and fellow artist Karin Schepers in June 1955. (Schepers had a sister in Melbourne). From 1960-1963 he was lecturer of printmaking at the South Australian School of Art, Adelaide. Sellbach moved to Melbourne in 1965 and commenced work teaching printmaking at RMIT University. He was also involved as a joint founder, in establishing the Print Council of Australia in the same year. In 1977 he was appointed the founding Director of Canberra School of Art (Graphic Investigation workshop). He held this position of Director of the CSA from 1977 to 1985. From 1985 until his death in 2006 Udo Sellbach lived in Hobart, Tasmania

== Awards ==
In the 1997 Australia Day Honours Sellbach was awarded the Medal of the Order of Australia (OAM) for "service to art as an artist, to the development of printmaking and to art education".

== Collections ==
Sellbach had artwork collections at many different museums, all of which were in Australia. He had collections at many different museums and galleries, some of them prestigious. His artwork collections are at the National Gallery of Australia, Canberra, the Art Gallery of New South Wales, the Art Gallery of South Australia, the National Gallery of Victoria, the Queensland Art Gallery, Brisbane and, the Art Gallery of Western Australia, Perth.

== Exhibitions ==
- 21st Annual Maitland Prize 1977 included The George Galton Memorial Print Prize, Maitland City Art Gallery NSW (1977)
- Australian Print Survey Multiple venues (1963 – 1 December 1964) Multi-artist traveling exhibition.
- 'Australian Prints Today' Museum of History Washington (15 July 1966 – 15 September 1966)
- Tasmanian Museum and Art Gallery (8 March 1977 – 27 March 1977) Tasmania, Australia
- Carnegie Prints 1947-77 Margaret Carnegie touring print exhibition Wagga Wagga City Art Gallery NSW (24 January 1981 – 24 January 1981)
- Contemporary Art Gallery Two [Hobart]. (1973) Tasmania, Australia
- Contemporary Art Society. First Australia-Wide Graphic Art Exhibition. Contemporary Art Society of NSW. First Australia-Wide Graphic Art Exhibition David Jones' Art Gallery, Elizabeth st. Sydney (20 June 1960 – 1 July 1960)
- Exhibition of Australian Graphics Gallery Huntley (5 September 1974 – 21 September 1974) Canberra ACT
- Fifth International Biennial of Contemporary Colour Lithography. Cincinnati Art Museum USA (28 February 1958 – 15 April 1958)
- Grahame King and Udo Sellbach. Leveson Street Gallery (1966 – 1966) North Melbourne
- Graven Images in the Promised Land: A History of Printmaking in South Australia, 1836-1981. Art Gallery of South Australia (19 June 1981 – 2 August 1981)
- Karin Schepers and Udo Sellbach Peter Bray Gallery (1956 – 1956) Victoria, Australia
- Maude Vizard-Wholohan Prizes, 1960 Royal South Australian Society Of Arts Gallery (1960 – 1960) Australia (SA).
- Paintings and Prints by Udo Sellbach. Gallery A, Sydney (1968 – 1968)
- Printmakers as illustrators, The Age Gallery (1970 – 1970) VIC
- Recent Drawings and Prints [by Udo Sellbach Salamanca Place Gallery (1976 – 1976)
- Sellbach Crossley Gallery (1970 – 1970) VIC
- Ten printmakers 1970 National Gallery Of Victoria (18 September 1970 – 19 October 1970)
- The print, the press, the artist and the printer ... Limited Editions and Artists' Books from Art Presses of the ACT. Drill Hall Gallery ANU. (1 October 1994 – 1 October 1994) (ACT).
- Twelve Australian Lithographers Multiple venues ( December 1976)
- Udo Sellbach The Little Gallery Devonport, Tasmania. (1972 – 1972)
- Udo Sellbach, prints. Nundah Gallery (23 February 1967 – 5 March 1967) Canberra ACT
