= Mary McQueen =

Presbyterian deaconess, orphanage matron, social worker

Mary McQueen (13 July 1860 – 30 May 1945) was a New Zealand Presbyterian deaconess, orphanage matron and social worker. She was born in Ballarat, Victoria, Australia on 13 July 1860.
