= Lost Dogs' Home =

Australian animal welfare organisation

The Lost Dogs’ Home is an Australian organisation with shelters and pounds in Victoria. It was established in 1910 to provide a temporary home for Melbourne’s lost and starving dogs. Today The Lost Dogs’ Home cares for more than eighteen thousand lost, stray, injured and abandoned dogs and cats every year and is Australia's largest animal shelter. They also host services and initiatives to promote animal welfare and responsible pet ownership. These people who work for this organisation want to take care of these poor animals to make them strong and ready for an owner to come adopt them.

== Function ==
In its role as an animal shelter, The Lost Dogs' Home operates 24/7 animal pickup services; provides medical and behavioural treatments; facilitates the pet reuniting process; and rehomes animals through adoption program or rescue groups.

As an advocacy group, The Lost Dogs’ Home promotes responsible pet ownership. It has launched an online pet license program to help prospective owners understand what is required to be a responsible owner. It runs low-cost MADI events (Mobile services for Adoption, Desexing and responsible pet ownership Information) around the state of Victoria. MADI program seeks to make basic pet services accessible to the disadvantaged social-economic communities.

Other supporting activities include pet training services, foster care program and The Lost Dogs' Home Vet Hospital, formerly the Frank Samways Vet Clinic.

The Lost Dogs Home has had a long-standing relationship with rescue groups prior to the new management and continues to expand its rescue program and partners.

== Controversy ==
The Lost Dogs' Home Board has been mired in controversy following a series of high-profile terminations beginning in 2015 when Dr Graeme Smith was unceremoniously removed as managing director after 28 years. Vince Haining was the second head of the charity appointed as an acting CEO. Following the third and fourth interim CEOs Paul Kirkpartrick and Terry Makings, an executive recruitment process saw Kerry Thompson appointed as a permanent CEO in October 2015.

Thompson left the organisation in September 2016, where it was reported that the CEO resigned over a trouble-plagued relationship with the Board; making it the third to leave since 2015. The animal shelter released a statement confirming the former chief executive Kerry Thompson left the top job after trouble with the board. “Due to differences between the board of TLDH and Ms Thompson in relation to the strategic direction of TLDH, Ms Thompson has decided to resign and pursue other opportunities,” the statement read.

The Annual General Meeting in December 2016 was extraordinarily reported in detail after a short and targeted recruitment drive for new members that saw frustration and anger boil over between existing and new factions. "There were a lot of elderly people there who were very unhappy. They were asking a lot of questions about the votes and the finances and the board wouldn't answer all of them. They were getting very upset. The dispute centres on the board's use of several hundred proxy votes to block the election of a new director, and its refusal to answer several questions from the floor. Supporters of the unsuccessful board candidate, Georgia Murphy, sought legal advice over whether the board breached regulations by quietly reopening membership so soon before the AGM and apparently inviting people to join. Chair of the board also used the hundreds of new proxy votes to block a motion to have her removed."

An Extraordinary Meeting saw the Constitution amended on topics of conduct and voting rights on 13 July 2017.

a. Life Members were no longer entitled to vote at any meeting of the Members, with Directors holding sole voting rights.

b. Offensive or disruptive behaviour The chairperson of an Annual General Meeting or a general meeting may take any action that he or she considers appropriate for the safety of persons attending the meeting and the orderly conduct of the meeting and may refuse admission to, or require to leave and remain out of, the meeting any person: (a) in possession of a pictorial-recording or sound-recording device; (b) in possession of a placard or banner; (c) in possession of an article considered by the chairman to be dangerous, offensive or liable to cause disruption; (d) who refuses to produce or permit examination of any article, or the contents of any article, in the person's possession; (e) who behaves or threatens to behave in a dangerous, offensive or disruptive way; or (f) who is not entitled to receive notice of the meeting.

Andrew Israel was appointed as the sixth CEO in four years in October 2016, ending after a period of 20 months. As of October 2018, Keith Drew was the CEO of The Lost Dogs' Home.

Geoff Brooks became Chair for a period of months.

== See also ==
- Animal welfare and rights in Australia
