= George Baldessin =

Australian painter and sculptor (1939–1978)

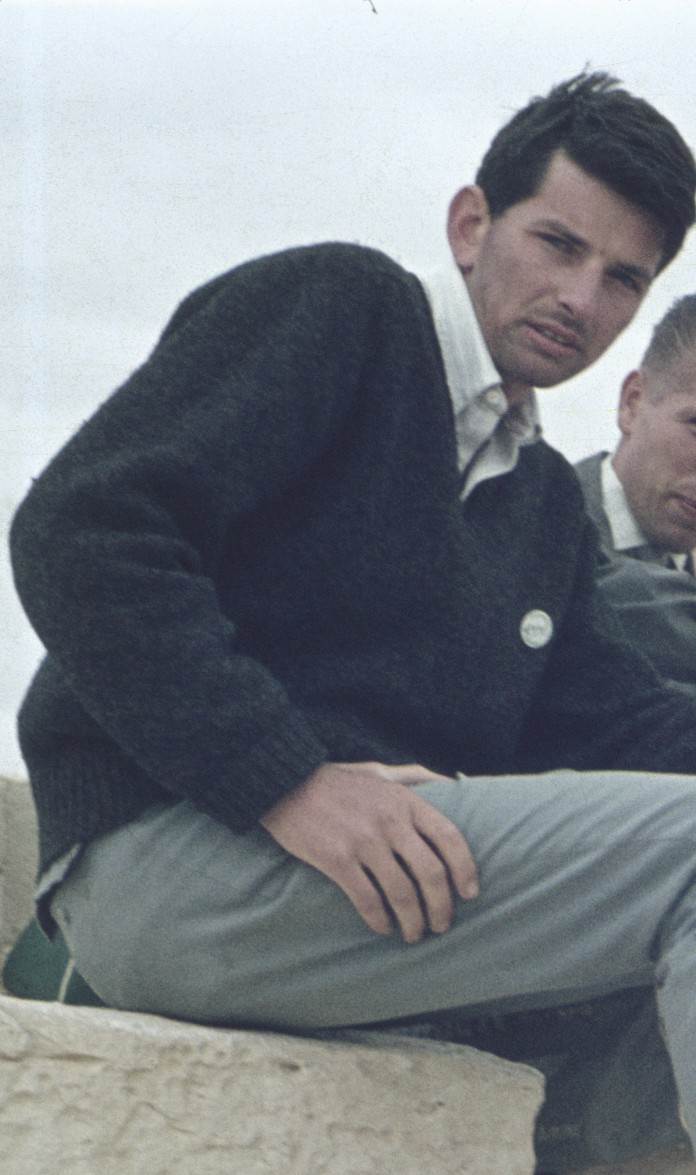
- Born: 19 May 1939; San Biagio di Callalta, Italy
- Died: 9 August 1978 (aged 39); Heidelberg, Victoria, Australia
- Education: Royal Melbourne Technical College, Melbourne; Chelsea School of Art, London; Brera Academy, Milan
- Occupations: artist, art teacher
- Known for: Etching, Printmaking, Sculpture

Signature
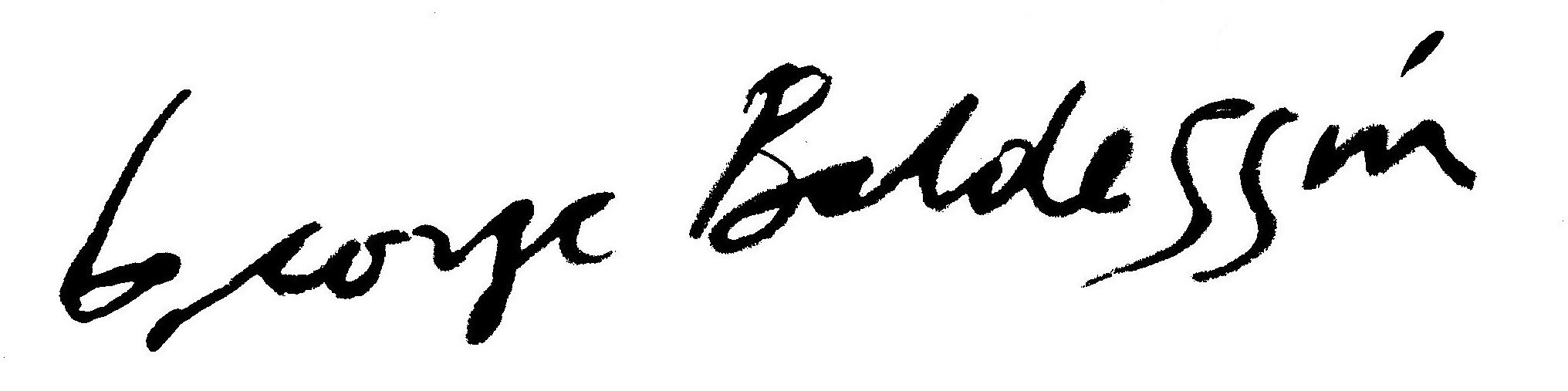

George Baldessin (19 May 1939 – 9 August 1978) was an Italian–Australian artist.

== Early life and education ==
George Victor Joseph (George) Baldessin was born on 19 May 1939 in San Biagio di Callalta, Veneto, Italy. His father, Luigi, was born in 1914 in Monastier di Treviso; his mother, Carmen Cervi, was born in 1920 in nearby Montebelluna and emigrated with her family to Queenstown, Tasmania at the age of five, gaining Australian citizenship in 1928 and moving back to Italy two years later. In 1939, a few months after George's birth, Carmen returned to Australia; Luigi planned to join her with George soon afterwards, but was forced to postpone their departure due to the advent of the Second World War. Father and son finally embarked for Australia on board the ship Ugolino Vivaldi in 1949, landing at Melbourne on 17 February. Both Luigi and George were naturalized in 1954; later in his life, George chose to conceal his Italian childhood, claiming to friends and colleagues that he was born in Melbourne.

At 13, having lied about his real age, George Baldessin began working as a part-time waiter at the Menzies Hotel in Melbourne; Owen Gammel, a fellow waiter and art student, was positively impressed by the artistic quality of his sketches of Port Melbourne docks, and encouraged the young George to enroll in an art school. From 1958 to 1961 Baldessin attended the Royal Melbourne Technical College, where he gradually lost interest in painting and became more interested in sculpture and printmaking; among his professors was Tate Adams. After gaining his Diploma of Fine Art (Painting), in 1962 Baldessin moved to London, where he studied printmaking at the Chelsea School of Art; in September of the same year he visited Spain. In this period, and most notably during his English stay, Baldessin discovered many artists that would profoundly influence his later production, including Francis Bacon, David Hockney, Peter Blake, Ingmar Bergman, and Luis Buñuel. In 1963 he attended the Accademia di Belle Arti di Brera in Milan, under professor Marino Marini and his assistant, Alik Cavaliere. Cavaliere soon became Baldessin's mentor, and the surrealist vocabulary of his work played a decisive role in shaping the young artist's aesthetic.

== Career ==
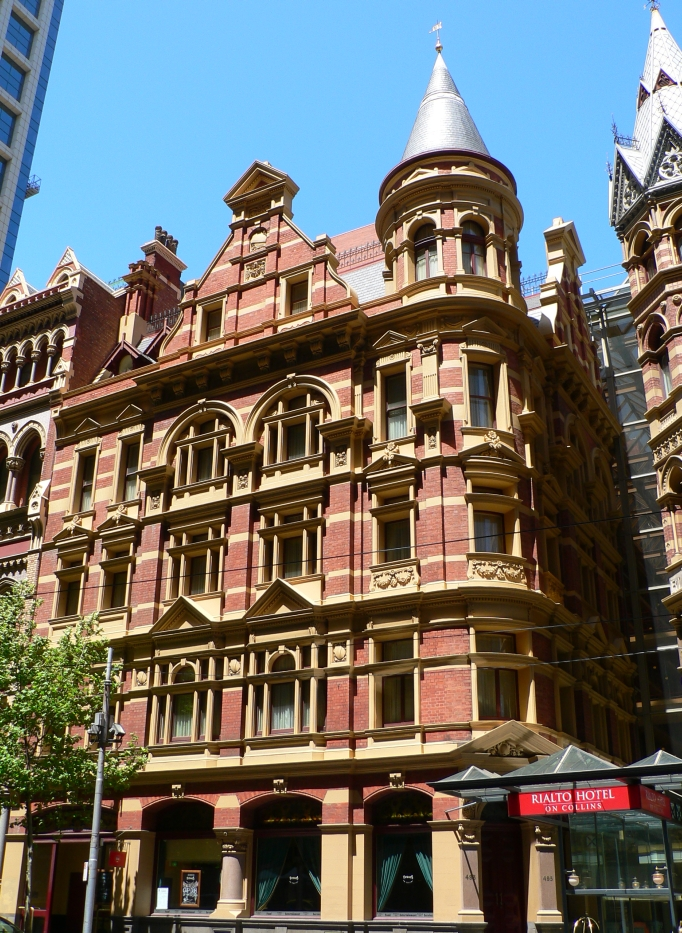
487-495 Collins St., the Winfield Building, on Victorian Heritage Register, retained as part of Rialto Towers.

Baldessin returned to Australia on 8 July 1963, and held his first one-person exhibition at Melbourne's Argus Gallery in June 1964; as pointed out by Memory Jockisch Holloway, the Argus Gallery exhibit "was the rite de passage which marked Baldessin's coming of age in Australian art". In the following years he had his sculptures and prints displayed in various Australian galleries. In 1966 he won the "Alcorso-Sekers" Travelling Scholarship Award for Sculpture, and spent two weeks in Japan; moreover, he took part in the exhibition 'Australian Prints Today' at the Smithsonian Institution in Washington, D.C.

Baldessin married Shirley Anne ('Tess') Edwards on 10 April 1971 (he had been previously married to Alison Patricia Walmsley from 1966 to 1970); Tess gave him two sons: Gabriel (1975) and Auguste (1977).

In 1968 Baldessin opened an art studio in the Winfield building, Collins Street, Melbourne; over the next few years, the place evolved into a vibrant atelier and meeting place for young artists and students. In 1970 he was awarded the Geelong Print Prize, and in 1971 he won the Comalco Invitation Award for Sculpture for having invented silver aluminium foil print. Some of the other awards he received include the Maitland Print Prize (1967 and 1970), the Shepparton Print Prize (1970, shared with Jan Senbergs), and a Drawing Prize at the Second International Biennale for Drawing in Yugoslavia (1970). In 1974, following his retrospective exhibit at the Mornington Peninsula Arts Centre, the National Gallery of Australia acquired 279 of Baldessin's etching plates and prints: this set was the first nucleus of the National Gallery's collection of his works. Together with Imants Tillers, Baldessin represented Australia at the XIII São Paulo Art Biennial in 1975, exhibiting the set of etchings Occasional Images from a City Chamber, and the sculptural work Occasional Screens with Seating Arrangement. From 1975 to 1977 Baldessin lived in Paris; during his French sojourn he attended the Lacourière-Frélaut engraving workshop and hung out with Imants Tillers, soon becoming close friends with him.

== Death and legacy ==
George Baldessin was injured in a car accident and died at Heidelberg on 9 August 1978, at the age of 39. The National Gallery of Victoria dedicated him a memorial exhibition in 1983; the Heide Museum of Modern Art housed a retrospective of his drawings in 1991, and the Art Gallery of New South Wales featured him as a focus artist in 1999. A Baldessin Foundation Travelling Fellowship for young sculptors was established in 1998. In 2001 Tess restored Baldessin's etching studio in St Andrews and converted it to a shared workshop, The Baldessin Press & Studio. The Australian National University named one of its campus structures (the Baldessin Precinct Building) after the artist. In 2018 the National Gallery of Victoria showcased the work of George Baldessin and Brett Whiteley in an exhibition titled Parallel Visions, “featuring some of their most iconic works.”

== Work ==
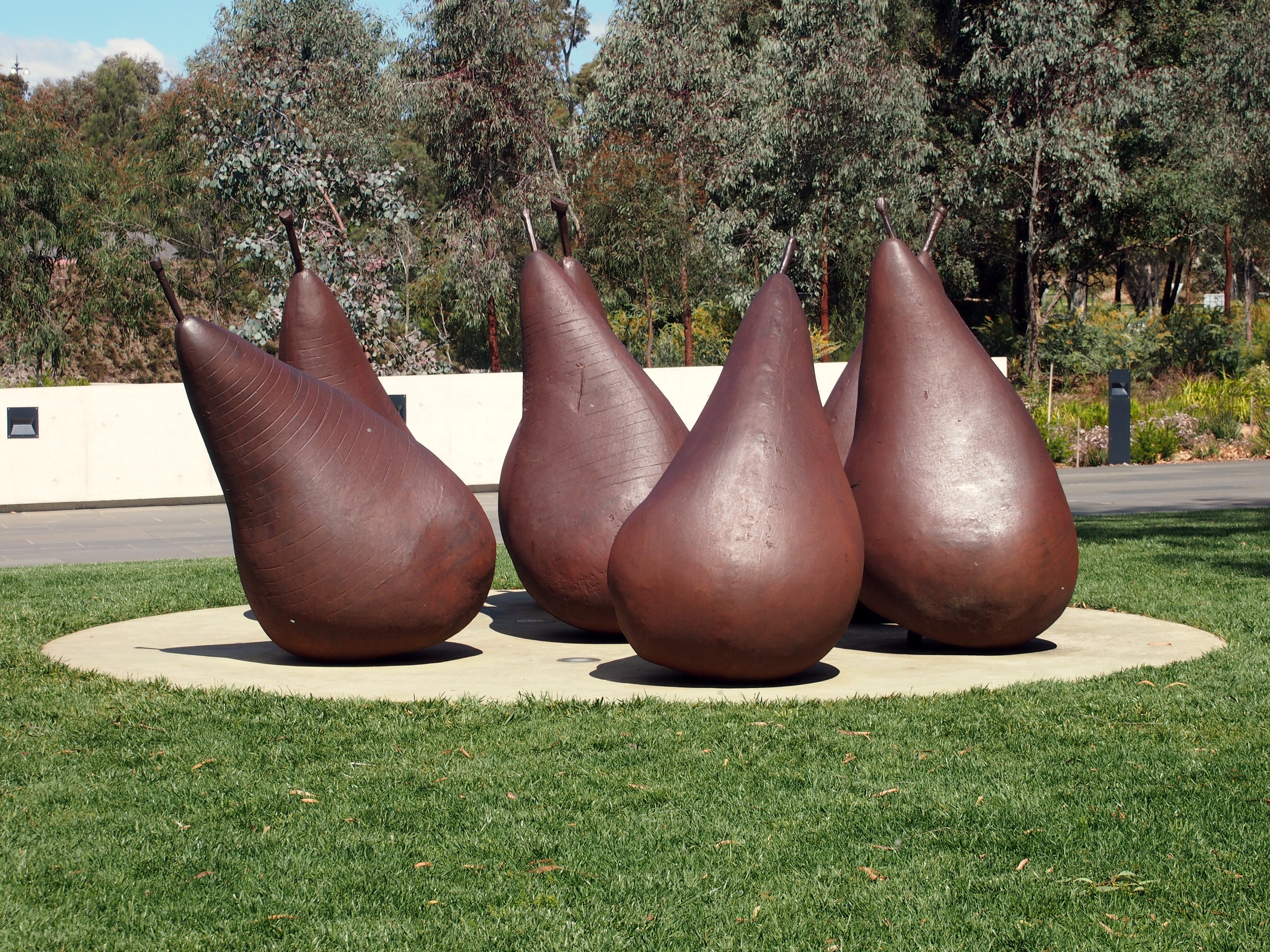
The sculpture Pear – version number 2 (1973) outside the National Gallery of Australia

Baldessin considered printmaking and sculpture two complementary arts. He once asserted: "What better place to work out sculpture than on metal plates? … Drawing on metal is more like the end result of sculpture than using a paper and pen".

One of Baldessin's most iconic works is Pear – version number 2 (1973), a group of seven steel pears placed in the forecourt of the National Gallery of Australia. Pears are an important symbol in the artist's iconography—representing women, sensual eating and physical desire—and prove the great influence of Alik Cavaliere's art on Baldessin.

Baldessin's work can be found in the collections of the National Gallery of Australia, all state galleries and several regional galleries, as well as in many university collections. The New York Museum of Modern Art owns two of his etchings: Head Through Blind (1967) and Banquet for No Eating No. 2 (1971).

== See also ==
Australian art
