= Grahame King =

Australian artist

- Grahame King
- Born: Grahame Edwin King; 23 February 1915; Melbourne, Australia
- Died: 11 October 2008 (aged 93); Melbourne, Australia
- Education: National Gallery School, Victoria (1934–39); Elton Fox Academy; George Bell School; Central School of Art, London (1947–49).
- Known for: Printmaker, painter
- Awards: Member of the Order of Australia 1991 for services to education.

Grahame Edwin King (23 February 1915 – 11 October 2008) was a master Australian printmaker, who has been called the "patron saint of contemporary Australian printmaking". He was responsible for the revival of print making in Australia in the 1960s. He helped set up the Print Council of Australia, of which he was the first Honorary Secretary and was later President. He taught printmaking at The Royal Melbourne Institute of Technology (RMIT) from 1966 to 1988. In 1991, he was awarded an Order of Australia for his services to education. As well as teaching, King produced his own art work, concentrating on lithographs and monotypes. He was also a skilled photographer and used his photography both in his teaching and in his practice.

== Life ==
Grahame Edwin King was born in Melbourne on 23 February 1915. He left school when he was about fifteen and went to work. In 1934, he started studying commercial art at night at the Working Men's College of Melbourne (which became Melbourne Technical College and later the Royal Melbourne Institute of Technology (RMIT)). Later he went to the Elton Fox Academy, which taught traditional painting. In the late 1930s, King helped pioneer the new art of chromo-photolithography which transformed colour advertising in the print industry. He was able to make use of this expertise for the rest of his career. In 1939, the year of the highly influential exhibition of French and British Contemporary Art in Melbourne sponsored by the Melbourne Herald, King started attending night classes at the art school of the National Gallery of Victoria, which he continued for three years.

Beakon, lithograph, printed in colour, from five stones/plates, (1985)

King was in the army from 1942 until 1946. He was based in Melbourne, so he was also able to attend Saturday afternoon art classes with George Bell. Bell had recently returned from overseas and had brought back news of European Modernism and enthusiasm for artists such as Modigliani, Derain, Braque, Matisse and Picasso. King later said that Bell "opened our eyes to modern art and it was a tremendous experience". King's painting at this time shows the influence of George Bell's style of early modernism. While he was in the army, King met the artist John Brack, who remained a friend until the latter's death in 1999. In 1945, King joined the Victorian Artists Society and soon became its secretary and exhibitions manager.

In late 1947, like many young Australians at that time, King went to Europe. He based himself in England at The Abbey Arts Centre in Hertfordshire. Other Australian artists resident at The Abbey at that time included the painters Leonard French, Helen Marshall, James Gleeson and Noel Counihan, the sculptor Robert Klippel, and the art historian Bernard Smith. King studied drawing with Bernard Meninsky and attended print-making classes at the Central School of Arts and Crafts in London. Later he toured Britain and Europe, producing many drawings and water-colours of buildings and scenery. These works showed him to be an "astute observer", with a "keen visual eye and [a] mature sense of design, composition and colour" They are now held by the National Gallery of Australia in Canberra. In Europe, King saw the work of Cubists, Surrealists and other abstract artists such as Paul Klee. He responded to the "modernist modes involving the flattening and fragmentation of the image and the use of free-flowing line to express movement and rhythm" and particularly to the work of Georges Braque. This experience defined the direction of King's own work, which became increasingly abstract from then on.

While he was at The Abbey, King met his future wife, the Berlin-born sculptor, Inge Neufeld (Inge King), whom he married in 1950. She had been trained in Berlin and Glasgow, but had spent some time in New York City, where she encountered American Abstract Expressionism. Her own work was also tending towards abstraction. The compatibility of their artistic interests and their support for each other influenced the later development of their art for both of them.

The couple moved back to Melbourne in early 1951. They held their first joint exhibition in Melbourne later that year, with paintings and drawings by Grahame and sculptures and jewellery by Inge, and took part in other exhibitions during the following years. But, for the decade after their return, most of Grahame King's time and energy was taken up with earning a living and with building their house at Warrandyte on the outskirts of Melbourne. This house, designed by the architect Robin Boyd, now has a State Heritage classification. During this time, King had no access to a printing press, but he continued to paint.

In 1961, Vic Greenhouse, head of the art department at the Royal Melbourne Institute of Technology (RMIT) invited King to join the group of printmakers, which included Fred Williams and Hertha Kluge-Pott, who were allowed to use its printing facilities on one day per week. The following year (1962), RMIT bought a lithography press. King was one of the few able to use it. From then on King concentrated on producing lithographs and creative monotypes. In 1965, he acquired a small off-set litho press (12 ins x 15 ins or about 30.5 x 38.1 cm) for his studio at Warrandyte. Although this press was "a bit on the small side", by designing for its limitations King could make larger prints. Some years later, he acquired a larger press which "gave him scope to wield a longer, wider brush-mark on the lithographic plate".

The standing of printmaking as an art form in Australia had been improving for some time. At the National Gallery of Victoria, Dr Ursula Hoff had established a serious collection of prints and drawings and was actively collecting Australian prints. An important exhibition, the Australian Print Survey, curated by Daniel Thomas of the Art Gallery of New South Wales, was shown in all the major Australian cities in 1963–4. By the mid 1960s, King was recognised as one of Australia's foremost printmakers. In 1965, Dr Hoff convened a meeting of printmakers which led to the establishment of the Print Council of Australia (PCA). King was on the inaugural committee. He continued to work with the Print Council for many years, becoming one of the most prominent and active promoters of printing as an art. During his time with the PCA, he was involved with organising its annual programmes, and with preparing and presenting exhibitions, which toured to the state capitals and to many regional towns. The PCA also hosted a number of international exhibitions. King was also associated with the Australian Print Workshop from its inception in 1981.

In 1966, King was appointed Lecturer in Painting, Drawing and Lithography at RMIT. He worked there until he retired in 1988. He was an important influence on two generations of Melbourne's printmakers.

In 1969, King received a British Council grant for a study tour of printmaking facilities in England. He also visited France, Switzerland, Italy and America, where he visited the Pratt Graphics Centre in New York. Later, in 1974, the Kings visited Europe and also Japan, where one of their daughters was studying. King was able to study Japanese printmaking and papermaking techniques. King noted later that this experience had been important for his work. In 1976, the Kings again went to Europe, visiting Germany, the Netherlands and Norway and returned via Japan. There were further study trips to Europe and Japan in 1982 and to America in 1990.

In the late 1970s and early 1980s, King made several trips to the Northern Territory and Arnhem Land and later to the Great Barrier Reef. These provided another important influence on his work. Images inspired by the scenery and the aboriginal rock art that he saw there were incorporated into his lithographs from this time. During the 1980s, he started to paint again and also to work in mixed media. In 1991, King was awarded an AM (Member of the Order of Australia) for services to art education. He continued to exhibit until a few years before his death in 2008. His work is represented in a number of major collections including that of the National Gallery of Australia in Canberra.

== King and his work ==
Colmar, Alsace 1949, watercolour, (1949)

King was able to draw well, and continued to draw throughout his life. Vincent Alessi notes of King's European drawings that "the drawings are not merely documentary sketches of places visited. Rather they quietly scratch the surface, capturing the rhythm, heart and sensibilities of a location and its people. It is this aspect that best reveals King’s humanity". Jane Eckett says that: "For Grahame King drawing represented much more than simply a means of describing the world. It was his way of learning about the world, synthesizing observation, thought, feeling and intuition".

King made two significant decisions about his art. The first was in the late 1940s, when he decided to focus on Abstract Expressionism. The second was in the early 1960s, when he decided to concentrate on print-making, particularly lithography. Sacha Grishin notes of King's prints at this time that:

King's earliest lithographs of 1962 were simply brilliant, not only in context of his own work, but within the broader context of the art of lithography. The use of lithographic crayons, the watery film of touche and the scraping back of surfaces to produce stark contrasts in the surface textures were all properties which were unique to lithography and which King exploited with unerring skill.

King did not do detailed preliminary drawings for his lithographs. Nor did he make an artist's print when printing them. Rather, he printed the whole edition in one colour, then added other colours in subsequent print runs until "the print says it is finished ... At some stage, the work of art takes over and I have to understand it".

Jenny Zimmer noted King's "life-long habit of making drawings and taking photographs of [natural] phenomena before returning to the studio to compose his 'abstractions'. The latter process sometimes evolves over a number of years, only to be resolved after considerable struggle. A print may go through several stages of production and sometimes these stages are years apart and the result of considerable contemplation. This is the mark of an abstractionist who is not prepared to allow pure intuition, emotion or improvisation to determine the end result."

An important influence on King's work were his trips to Japan in 1974 and subsequently. He said of his first trip: "Looking back I realise it was tremendously important for my work, although unconscious, it somehow removed some inhibitions" Later he said: "I wish I had met the East twenty years earlier - I would have learned something positive about calligraphy. I love the calligraphic mark."

The landscape and the aboriginal art of northern Australia were another important influence on King's work after his trips there in the 1980s. Zimmer notes that his first prints: "described the giant ant-hills, sparse vegetation and rock formations", but later he "focused his attention on the interiors of caves and rock formations and, using highly sophisticated lithographic techniques, produced his fleeting impressions of ancient Aboriginal markings. ... a result of what for King was the awesome experience of witnessing such ancient and significant human mark-making".

Grahame King usually did his own printing. But in 1998, the Australian Print Workshop(APW) invited King to produce a set of lithographs, which were then printed by the APW printer, Martin King (no relation). Martin King summed up his experience of making this prints for Grahame King: "I now know why Grahame has long been an inspiration and mentor to artists and printmakers. His art, his knowledge and his passion for printmaking have all been shared in his most distinguished way".

In the mid-1990s, King produced some large, computer-assisted, experimental paintings. King said of this work that: "These paintings have evolved from a lifetime’s response to the study of form and colour in nature and are an attempt to express the perpetual excitement of new visual experience".

== Bibliography ==
King, Grahame E. (2009), A modern grand tour : Grahame King's European drawings 1947-1949 / [La Trobe University Museum of Art], exhibition at La Trobe University Museum of Art, Melbourne, 24 February - 10 April 2009, ISBN 9781921377617

Grishin, Sasha; Butler, Roger, 1948-; King, Grahame E., 1915-2008; Bright, Libby (2005), The Art of Grahame King / Sasha Grishin; with a foreword by Roger Butler; and contributions by Libby Bright ... [et al.], South Yarra, Vic: Macmillan Art Publishing, ISBN 1876832592

Alessi, Vincent. Catalogue essay for A Modern Grand Tour: Grahame King’s European Drawings 1947-1949, exhibition at La Trobe University Museum of Art, Melbourne, 24 February - 10 April 2009.

Bright, Libby. "The Lithographs of Grahame King". In The Art of Grahame King by Sasha Grishin, 59–75.

Eckett, Jane. Grahame King, Macmillan Art Publishing, South Yarra, Vic., 2011.

Field, Caroline. "The Perpetual Excitement of New Visual Experiences". In The Art of Grahame King by Sasha Grishin, 145–151.

Gleeson, James. Transcript of interview with Grahame King on 18 October 1979,.

Grishin, Sasha. The Art of Grahame King, with a foreword by Roger Butler and contributions by Libby Bright, Diana Davis, Caroline Field, Martin King, Anne Virgo and Jenny Zimmer, Macmillan Art Publishing, South Yarra, Vic, 2005.

King, Grahame and Jim Allen. An Australian Bird Watchers' Pocket Book, with drawings by Grahame King and verse by Jim Allen, Macmillan Art Publishing, South Yarra, Vic., 2001.

King, Martin. "A Coat of Many Colours: A Personal Reflection on Working with Grahame King". In The Art of Grahame King by Sasha Grishin, 87.

Zimmer, Jenny. "Grahame King: Dualities". In The Art of Grahame King by Sasha Grishin, 77–85.

Zimmer, Jenny. "Grahame King: A Melbourne Story". In The Art of Grahame King by Sasha Grishin, 89-143.

Zimmer, Jenny. "Grahame King: Prints and Paintings", catalogue essay for Grahame King: Lithographs and Paintings, an exhibition at the Australian National University Drill Hall Gallery, Canberra, 4 July - 11 August 2002.

Zimmer, Jenny. “'Patron saint' of printmaking", obituary for Grahame King, AM, The Age, Melbourne, 22 October 2008.
