= Kenneth Jack =

Australian artist

Kenneth William David Jack AM MBE RWS, (5 October 1924 – 10 June 2006) was an Australian watercolour artist who specialised in painting the images of an almost forgotten outback life: old mine workings, ghost towns, decaying farm buildings.

== Family ==
The son of Harold James Jack (1901–1977), and Ethel Gertrude Jack (1892–1950), née Orr, Kenneth William David Jack was born in Malvern on 5 October 1924.

His son-in-law Fred Schmidt is also an Australian watercolour artist.

== Artist ==
He became a professional painter at the age of 39 after giving up his job as senior instructor at the Caulfield Institute of Technology, and continued as a prolific painter until his death on the 10th of June 2006.

== Recognition ==
- 1977: elected to the Royal Watercolour Society.
- 1982: awarded the MBE: "for service to the arts".
- 1987: awarded the Order of Australia (AM): "for service to the arts, particularly to watercolour painting".

== The Kenneth Jack Memorial Drawing Award ==
The Kenneth Jack Memorial Drawing Award was established in his honour in 2007 by The Australian Guild of Realist Artists. The inaugural winner was Margaret Gurney.

== Collections ==
Kenneth Jack's works can be found in these collections:

- Royal Collection at Windsor.
- Victoria and Albert museum.
- National Gallery of Australia.
- The Australian War Memorial
- The capital city collections of every Australian state.
