= Ursula Hoff =

Australian scholar and author

Ursula Hoff AO OBE FAHA (26 December 1909 in London, UK – 10 January 2005 in Melbourne) was an Australian scholar and prolific author on art. She enjoyed a long career at the National Gallery of Victoria in Melbourne, where she was deputy director from 1968 to 1973. Her involvement then continued when she was appointed London Adviser of the Felton Bequest (1975–83), a major charitable foundation dedicated to the NGV.

== Early years ==
Ursula Hoff was born on 26 December 1909 in London to Hans Leopold Hoff, Hamburg-based German Jewish merchant, and his wife, née Thusnelde Margarethe (Tussi) Bulcke, of a German Lutheran upper-middle-class family. Shortly after her birth, the family moved to Hamburg, where Ursula grew up and completed her primary and secondary education.

In 1930, Ursula Hoff commenced academic studies spread between the universities of Frankfurt, Cologne, and Munich; later the same year, she commenced studies at the University of Hamburg; among her teachers were Erwin Panofsky, Aby Warburg, Ernst Cassirer, and Fritz Saxl.

Upon Adolf Hitler's appointment as Chancellor of Germany and the introduction of anti-Jewish measures in January 1933, Ursula Hoff's father, Leopold Hoff, left immediately for London; Ursula and her mother Tussi followed him shortly in July. Because she was born in England, Ursula was able to take up British citizenship, and due to her excellent English, she was quickly absorbed into British academic and cultural institutions. Over the next several years she worked with the curatorial staff at the Ashmolean Museum in Oxford; the British Museum; at the Courtauld Institute of Art. However, existing employment regulations in England barred her, and many other refugees, from permanent full-time positions.

She was also able to continue working on a doctoral thesis, Rembrandt und England, which investigated the influence of Rembrandt Harmensz. van Rijn in the eighteenth-century England, primarily through the appointment of Sir Godfrey Kneller to the court of William III of England in 1688. From 1934 to 1935 returned to complete her thesis at the University of Hamburg, where she was awarded a PhD.

From 1935 to 1939 Hoff continued living in London and working in a variety of curatorial and research positions at the Royal Academy; National Gallery; and the British Museum; and wrote for the Journal of the Warburg Institute and the Burlington Magazine.

== National Gallery of Victoria ==
In December 1939, Hoff arrived in Australia to take up a position of secretary at the University Women's College, University of Melbourne. In 1942, she was invited by Sir Daryl Lindsay, the newly appointed director of the National Gallery of Victoria, to deliver a series of lunch time lectures at Melbourne's premier cultural institution. In 1943, Lindsay appointed Hoff as the NGV's Assistant Keeper of Prints and Drawings. She thus became the first woman and first tertiary qualified art historian to work within a state gallery in Australia. Hoff remained at the NGV until her retirement in 1973, becoming Keeper of Prints and Drawings in 1949, and its deputy director in 1968.

During her tenure at the National Gallery of Victoria, Hoff pioneered the professional cataloguing of the NGV's holdings; produced important and internationally recognised publications and catalogues of its collections; curated numerous important exhibitions; published monographs on Charles Conder, William Blake, Rembrandt, and many others; secured important works by Paul Klee, Marc Chagall, Albrecht Dürer, Rembrandt, Pablo Picasso, Anthony van Dyck, Giovanni Batista Tiepolo, Salvador Dalí, and innumerable others for the NGV's collection; became Founding Editor of the Art Bulletin of Victoria; and published extensively in Australian and International art journals.

An excellent source on Ursula Hoff's early years and her work at the National Gallery of Victoria is Sheridan Palmer's Centre of the Periphery: Three European Art Historians in Melbourne (Nth Melbourne, Vic: Australian Scholarly Publishing, 2008).

== London advisor to the Felton Bequest ==
In 1975, Ursula Hoff was appointed advisor to the Felton Bequest and moved to London. Over her tenure as the London Advisor, she secured many outstanding works for the National Gallery of Victoria, including Francisco de Goya, Robert Rauschenberg, Bridget Riley, François Boucher, Canaletto, Pierre-Auguste Renoir, and an important suite of 16th- and 17th-century Indian Mughal miniatures.

She continued travelling extensively to research the NGV's collection; assist with the loan exhibition of masterpieces from the State Hermitage, Leningrad, USSR (now St Petersburg, Russia), which toured Australian galleries 1979–80; and continued contributing articles to Australian and International art journals.

During her time overseas, she also advised the Everard Studley Miller Bequest, the Art Foundation of Victoria, Art Gallery of South Australia, National Gallery of Australia, as well as a number of high-profile private collections, notably that of James Fairfax.

Ursula Hoff retired as London Advisor of the Felton Bequest in April 1983.

Important sources on Hoff's years as London Advisor of the Felton Bequest are her meticulously kept diaries, which had been donated to the University of Melbourne Archives; and Colin Holden's The Outsider: A Portrait of Ursula Hoff (Nth Melbourne, Vic: Australian Scholarly Publishing, 2009).

== Educational role ==
Ursula Hoff also played an important role in education of art history in Australia. In 1947, she was invited by Professor Joseph Burke, the inaugural Herald Chair of Fine Arts at the University of Melbourne, to join the teaching staff of his new department. In consequence of her appointment at the National Gallery of Victoria, Hoff taught part-time and in the evenings. Hoff's teaching was firmly in the tradition of Erwin Panofsky, revealing the meaning of disguised symbols. First-year students had to read Panofsky's Studies in Iconology (1939) and Meaning in the Visual Arts (1955). She reinforced her lectures by conducting seminars for students in the NGV's Print Room. Hoff continued her dual position of the NGV curator and the University of Melbourne lecturer until her move to London in 1974.

Upon her return from London in 1984, Hoff was invited to resume her teaching at the University of Melbourne, and in 1986 she was appointed senior associate, Department of Fine Arts, University of Melbourne.

The importance of Hoff's educational role in Australia is extensively discussed in Sheridan Palmer's Centre of the Periphery, 2008.

== Later years ==
After retiring as London Advisor of the Felton Bequest, Ursula Hoff returned to Australia in 1984 and settled in Carlton, Victoria. She was invited to continue lecturing at the University of Melbourne, and in 1986 she was appointed senior associate of the university's department of fine arts.

She also continued researching the National Gallery of Victoria's collections; produced the fifth edition of European Paintings before 1800 at the National Gallery of Victoria in 1995; published a monograph on Arthur Boyd; contributed essays to catalogues of exhibitions by Charles Blackman, Arthur Boyd, and John Brack; and wrote for Australian art journals.

Ursula Hoff died in Heidelberg, Victoria, on 10 January 2005. A private service was organised at St Peter's, Eastern Hill, Melbourne, on 22 January, which was followed by a memorial service on 25 February at the Great Hall of the National Gallery of Victoria.

== Recognition ==
- Awarded PhD (Hamburg), LLD, DLit (Monash), DLitt (honoris causa)(La Trobe)
- Scholarship from Dutch Ministry of Education to Netherlands Institute of Art History 1963
- Britannica Australia Award 1966
- Foundation Fellow of the Australian Academy of the Humanities 1969
- Appointed Officer of the Order of the British Empire (OBE) in 1970
- Awarded Order of Australia (AO) in 1985

== Further information ==
Upon her retirement as its London Advisor, the Felton Bequest commissioned from John Brack a portrait of Ursula Hoff, which it then donated to the National Gallery of Victoria.

Hoff was an active member of the Australian Academy of the Humanities, serving as president in 1970 and vice-president in 1971.

Hoff left the sum of AUD600,000 to fund an annual Ursula Hoff Fellowship, administered by the Ian Potter Museum of Art at the University of Melbourne.

== Publications ==
=== Books and exhibition catalogues, in chronological order ===
- — Rembrandt and England. Hamburg, 1941.
- — Charles I, Patron of Artists. London: Collins, 1942.
- — Art Appreciation. Melbourne: Australian Army Education Services, 1945.
- — European Art before 1800, 1st edn. Melbourne: National Gallery of Victoria, 1948.
- — (with Alan McCulloch, Joan Lindsay, and Daryl Lindsay) Masterpieces of the National Gallery of Victoria. Melbourne: Cheshire, 1949.
- — (with Laurence Thomas) Jubilee Exhibition of Australian Art. Sydney: Ure Smith, 1951.
- — National Gallery of Victoria: Catalogue of Selected Pictures. Melbourne: National Gallery of Victoria for the Education Department, c. 1959.
- — Charles Conder: His Australian Years. Melbourne: National Gallery Society of Victoria, 1960.
- — The Melbourne Dante Illustrations by William Blake. Melbourne: National Gallery of Victoria, 1961.
- — European Art before 1800, 2nd edn. Melbourne: National Gallery of Victoria, 1961.
- — (and Margaret Plant) National Gallery of Victoria: Painting, Drawing, Sculpture. Melbourne: Cheshire, 1968.
- — European Art before 1800, 3rd edn. Melbourne: National Gallery of Victoria, 1948.
- — (with Nicholas Draffin) Rembrandt 1606-1696. Melbourne: National Gallery of Victoria, 1969.
- — (and Martin Davies) Les Primitifs Flamands I: Corpus de la Peinture des Anciens Pays-Bas Méridionaux au Quinzième Siècle 12: National Gallery of Victoria. Brussels: Centre National de Recherches Primitifs Flamands, 1971.
- — Charles Conder. Melbourne: Lansdowne Press, 1972.
- — Goethe and the Dutch Interior: a Study in the Imagery of Romanticism. Sydney: Sydney University Press, 1972.
- — (with introduction by Eric Westbrook) National Gallery of Victoria. London: Thames & Hudson, 1973; reprint 1979.
- — European Painting and Sculpture before 1800, 4th edn. Melbourne: National Gallery of Victoria, 1973.
- — The National Gallery of Victoria. London: Thames and Hudson, 1973.
- — Comments on the London Art Scene touching on changing attitudes in the art trade and on exhibition policies of public galleries and museums. Melbourne: National Gallery of Victoria, 1978.
- — The Felton Bequest. Melbourne: National Gallery of Victoria, 1983.
- — (with introduction by T.G. Rosenthal) The Art of Arthur Boyd. London: Deutsch, 1986.
- — (by Robert Lindsay, with essays by Ursula Hoff and Patrick McCaughey) John Brack: A Retrospective Exhibition. Melbourne: National Gallery of Victoria, 1987.
- — (with Emma Davapriam) European Paintings before 1800 in the National Gallery of Victoria, 5th edn. Melbourne: National Gallery of Victoria, 1995.

=== Articles, in chronological order ===
- — “Meditation in Solitude”, Journal of the Warburg Institute, 1:4, April 1938, 292–294.
- — “Peter Paul Rubens”, Old Master Drawings, XIII, June 1938, 14–16.
- — “Das Wesen der Französischen Kunst in Späten Mittelalter” [Book Review], The Burlington Magazine for Conoisseurs, 73:428, November 1938, 229–30.
- — “Albert Eckhout, ein niederländischer Maler...” [Book Review], The Burlington Magazine for Connoisseurs, 74:434, May 1939, 248.
- — “Some Aspects of Adam Elsheimer’s Artistic Development”, The Burlington Magazine for Connoisseurs, 75:437, August 1939, 58–64.
- — “Some Drawings in the Print Room of the National Gallery of Victoria”, Australian Artist, I, 1947.
- — “English Monumental Brasses”, Quarterly Bulletin of the National Gallery of Victoria, 3:1, 1948, 6–7.
- — “Rembrandt’s Drawings” [Book Review], Meanjin, 8:3, spring 1949, 188–190.
- — “Three Panels Reproduced Here…”, Quarterly Bulletin of the National Gallery of Victoria, 3:4, 1949, 3–4.
- — “Landscape into Art” [Book Review], Meanjin, 9:4, summer 1950, 313–314.
- — “The Print Collection”, Quarterly Bulletin of the National Gallery of Victoria, 4:3, 1950, 1–6.
- — “The Ideals of Topography and Illustration”, Quarterly Bulletin of the National Gallery of Victoria, 5:1, 1951, 4.
- — “Rembrandt’s Portrait of a Man”, Meanjin, 10:1, autumn 1951: 48–49.
- — “Reflections on the Heidelberg School”, Meanjin, 10:2, winter 1951, 125–33.
- — “Notes on the Jubilee Exhibition”, Meanjin, 10:2, winter 1951, 145–8.
- — “Rouault’s Christ’s Head; Constable’s The Loch”, Meanjin, 10:3, spring 1951: 257–8.
- — “Liotard’s Lady in a Turkish Dress”, Quarterly Bulletin of the National Gallery of Victoria, 5:2, 1951, 3–4.
- — “Rembrandt van Rijn (1606-1669)”, Quarterly Bulletin of the National Gallery of Victoria, 5:2, 1951, 2–3.
- — “The Drawing Reproduced Here…”, Quarterly Bulletin of the National Gallery of Victoria, 5:4, 1951, 4.
- — “St John the Baptist”, Quarterly Bulletin of the National Gallery of Victoria, 6:1, 1952, 3–4.
- — “Georges Rouault”, Quarterly Bulletin of the National Gallery of Victoria, 6:1, 1952, 5–6.
- — “The Art of Jean Bellette”, Meanjin, 11:4, summer 1952, 358–60.
- — “Catalan Stone Figure, 13th Century”, Quarterly Bulletin of the National Gallery of Victoria, 7:1, 1953, 4.
- — “Australian Paintings”, Quarterly Bulletin of the National Gallery of Victoria, 7:2, 1953, 1–2.
- — “Matisse’s revolutionary break-away from realistic representation”, Quarterly Bulletin of the National Gallery of Victoria, 7:2, 1953, 3.
- — “Géricault’s Entombment”, Quarterly Bulletin of the National Gallery of Victoria, 7:3, 1953, 1–2.
- — “These three recent acquisitions…”, Quarterly Bulletin of the National Gallery of Victoria, 7:3, 1953, 5–6.
- — “Content and Form in Modern Art”, Meanjin, 12:4, summer 1953, 449–50.
- — “Charles Conder”, The Burlington Magazine, 96:611, February 1954, 61.
- — “The Counts Czartoryski of Cracow”, Quarterly Bulletin of the National Gallery of Victoria, 8:2, 1954, 1–2.
- — “A recent acquisition…”, Quarterly Bulletin of the National Gallery of Victoria, 8:4, 1954, 4.
- — “Goethe and the Dutch Interior”, Australian Goethe Society Proceedings, 5, 1954/55, 43–48.
- — “Frederick McCubbin”, Frederick McCubbin, exhib. cat., Melbourne: National Gallery of Victoria, 1955.
- — “In the early nineties of the last century…”, Quarterly Bulletin of the National Gallery of Victoria, 9:1, 1955, 5–6.
- — “A group of recently acquired paintings…”, Quarterly Bulletin of the National Gallery of Victoria, 9:2, 1955, 5–6.
- — “The recently acquired plaque of Christ…”, Quarterly Bulletin of the National Gallery of Victoria, 9:3, 1955, 1–2.
- — “The landscape with a group of trees…”, Quarterly Bulletin of the National Gallery of Victoria, 9:3, 1955, 3–4.
- — “The Phases of McCubbin’s Art”, Meanjin, 15:3, spring 1956, 301–6.
- — “The acquisition through the Felton Bequest…”, Quarterly Bulletin of the National Gallery of Victoria, 10:3, 1956, 1–2.
- — “By their decision to lend…”, Quarterly Bulletin of the National Gallery of Victoria, 11:1, 1957, 1–2.
- — “From about 1927 onwards…”, Quarterly Bulletin of the National Gallery of Victoria, 11:2, 1957, 5–6.
- — “The bicentenary of William Blake”, Quarterly Bulletin of the National Gallery of Victoria, 11:4, 1957, 4–6.
- — “Albrecht Dürer: the Barlow Collection of Prints in the National Gallery of Victoria”, Meanjin, 16:2, winter 1957, 162–8.
- — “The Paintings of Arthur Boyd”, Meanjin, 17:2, 1958, 143–7.
- — “Recent acquisitions to the Print Room”, Quarterly Bulletin of the National Gallery of Victoria, 12:1, 1958, 1–4.
- — “Two valuable prints”, Quarterly Bulletin of the National Gallery of Victoria, 12:1, 1958, 5–6.
- — “A pupil of Giulio Campagnola”, Quarterly Bulletin of the National Gallery of Victoria, 12:2, 1958, 4.
- — “A Sculptor’s Thoughts, by Vera Mukhina” [Book Review], Meanjin, 18:1, 1959, 125–7.
- — “The Thomas D. Barlow Collection of Dürer’s engravings and woodcuts”, Annual Bulletin of the National Gallery of Victoria, 1, 1959, 14–19.
- — “Rachel de Ruvigny, Countess of Southampton, by Sir Anthony van Dyck”, Annual Bulletin of the National Gallery of Victoria, 2, 1960, 1–4.
- — “Portraits Acquired under the Everard Studley Miller Bequest”, Annual Bulletin of the National Gallery of Victoria, 2, 1960, 15–20.
- — “An Illuminated Byzantine Gospel Book”, Special Bulletin of the National Gallery of Victoria, 1961.
- — “The Woburn Abbey Paintings”, Meanjin, 21:1, 1962, 93–4.
- — “Paintings of S.T. Gill” [Book Review], Meanjin, 21:2, 1962, 247–51.
- — “A Constable Landscape after Claude”, Art Gallery of New South Wales Quarterly, 4:3, 1962, 111–113.
- — “A New Double Portrait by Rigaud”, Annual Bulletin of the National Gallery of Victoria, 5, 1963, 11–14.
- — “Recent Additions to the National Gallery”, Annual Bulletin of the National Gallery of Victoria, 5, 1963, 27–30.
- — “A History of Australian Painting [Book Review], Meanjin, 22:2, winter 1963, 227-35.
- — “John Olsen” [Book Review], Art and Australia, 1:2, summer 1963, 120.
- — “A.J.L. McDonnell as adviser to the Felton Bequest and its purchasing policy during the post-war period”, Annual Bulletin of the National Gallery of Victoria, 6, 1964, 2–7.
- — “Recent Additions to the National Gallery…”, Annual Bulletin of the National Gallery of Victoria, 6, 1964, 27–8.
- — “Australia’s National Gallery: Dutch and Flemish Pictures in Melbourne”, Apollo, 1964, 448–57.
- — “Alfred Felton’s Bequest” [Book Review], Meanjin, 23:1, 1964, 103–5.
- — “The Sources of Hercules and Antaeus by Rubens”, in In Honour of Daryl Lindsay: Essays and Studies, Melbourne: Oxford University Press, 1964.
- — “Charles Conder”, Art and Australia, 2:1, Summer 1964, 30–7.
- — “John Brack”, Art and Australia, 2:4, spring 1965, 276–81.
- — “Perth Art Prize”, Art and Australia, autumn 1965, 107.
- — “Recent Additions to the National Gallery…”, Annual Bulletin of the National Gallery of Victoria, 7, 1965, 26–31.
- — “Two Rococo Drawings by Boucher in the Print Room Collection”, Annual Bulletin of the National Gallery of Victoria, 8, 1966/67, 16–25.
- — “Clark on Rembrandt” [Book Review], The Age, 1967.
- — “Arthur Streeton at Coogee”, Art and Australia, 5:1, spring 1967, 286–9.
- — “Charles Conder”, Charles Conder, exhib. cat., Sydney: Art Gallery of New South Wales, 1966; Sheffield: Graves Art Gallery, 1967.
- — “Recent Additions to the National Gallery…”, Annual Bulletin of the National Gallery of Victoria, 8, 1967–68, 27–33.
- — “Foreword” [with Eric Westbrook]”, Art Bulletin of Victoria, 9, 1967-68, 3-5.
- — “Recent Additions to the National Gallery…”, Art Bulletin of Victoria, 9, 1967–68, 38–44.
- — “European Paintings”, Art and Australia: The National Gallery of Victoria Special Issue, 6:3, Summer 1968, 211–3.
- — “Prints and Drawings”, Art and Australia: The National Gallery of Victoria Special Issue, 6:3, Summer 1968, 217.
- — “Witt Collection Drawings in Adelaide”, Art and Australia, 5:4, Autumn 1968, 582.
- — “Recent Acquisitions and Donations”, Art Bulletin of Victoria, 10, 1968–69, 48–59.
- — “Rembrandt’s Image in the Twentieth Century”, Art and Australia, 7:1, winter 1969, 58–60.
- — “Pablo Picasso”, Picasso: La Suite Vollard, exhib. cat., Sydney: Bonython Art Gallery, and Melbourne: Tolarno Gallery, 1969.
- — “Editorial”, Art Bulletin of Victoria, 11, 1969–70, 2–3.
- — “Vale Franz Philipp”, Meanjin, 29:3, 1970, 337.
- — “Tobit Burying the Dead, a Newly Acquired Drawing by G.B. Castiglione”, Art Bulletin of Victoria, 12, 1970–71, 19–20.
- — “In Memory of Franz Philipp”, Art Bulletin of Victoria, 12, 1970–71, 30.
- — “Bendigo Art Gallery: Louis Buvelot”, Art Bulletin of Victoria, 12, 1970–71, 26.
- — “A tapestry from a painting by Simon Vouet”, Art Bulletin of Victoria, 13, 1971–72, 25–9.
- — “Editorial”, Art Bulletin of Victoria, 14, 1973, 4–5.
- — “Creative though Notorious: Charles Conder”, Hemisphere, 18, 6 Jun 1974, 16–22.
- — “Tribute to Ian Fairweather”, Meanjin, 33:4, summer 1974, 438–9.
- — “Rembrandt’s Shell – Conus Marmoreus”, Art Bulletin of Victoria, 16, 1975, 16–19.
- — “Three newly-acquired Symbolist Graphics by Ensor, Aman-Jean and Munch”, Art Bulletin of Victoria, 17, 1976, 20–28.
- — “Art Exhibitions in London and Edinburgh May–December 1975”, Art and Australia, 13:4, April–June 1976, 375–80.
- — “The Print Collection”, Art and Australia: Australian National Gallery Special Issue, 14:4, winter 1977, 308–11.
- — “Elitism and the Arts: How to Widen the Elite”, Art and Australia, XV:1, September 1977, 73–6.
- — “Tribute: Anthony Underhill”, Art and Australia, 15:2, summer 1977, 141–3.
- — “London Letter June 1976 to June 1977”, Art and Australia, 15:2, summer 1977, 200.
- — “National Gallery” [Book Review], Art and Australia, 15:3, autumn 1978, 247.
- — “Australian Paintings in British Collections”, Art and Australia, 16:2, summer 1978, 172.
- — “The Feat of Klee” [Book Review], Meanjin, 38:4, summer 1979, 529–34.
- — “Paul Klee: Figures and Faces” [Book Review], Art and Australia, 16:3, autumn 1979, 227.
- — “The Everard Studley Miller Bequest”, in Anthony Bradley and Terry Smith (eds), Australian Art and Architecture: Essays Presented to Bernard Smith. Melbourne: Oxford University Press, 1980.
- — “USSR: Old Master Paintings”, Art and Australia, 17:3, Autumn 1980, 232–3.
- — “Australian Paintings in the Royal Collections”, Art and Australia, 17:3, Autumn 1980, 267–9.
- — “London Letter”, 17:3, Art and Australia, March 1980, 274–5.
- — “View from London: Observations on the Art in the 1970s”, Art and Australia, 18:2, summer 1980, 138–40.
- — “USSR: Old Master Paintings”, Art and Australia, 17:3, March 1980, 232–3.
- — “Jack Manton Collection” [Book Review], Art and Australia, 18:1, spring 1980, 21.
- — “View from London: Observations on Art in the 1970s”, Art and Australia, 18:2, summer 1980, 138–40.
- — “Picasso and Velasquez”, Art and Australia, 18:3, autumn 1981, 280.
- — “London Letter”, Art and Australia, 19:2, summer 1981, 205–8.
- — “Gustave Courbet: Study for Young Ladies on the Banks of the Seine in Summer”, Art and Australia: Australian National Gallery Special Issue, 20:1, spring 1982, 52–4.
- — “Cross-currents in Dutch and Flemish painting in the Seventeenth Century”, Apollo, 118, 1983, 57–63.
- — “Charles Conder, Arthur Streeton, and Tom Roberts”, Apollo, 1983, 508–512.
- — “Letter from Texas”, Art and Australia, 20:4, winter 1983, 456–60.
- — “Observations of Art History in Melbourne 1946-1964”, Australian Journal of Art, 3, 1983, 5–9.
- — Charles Blackman: Works on Paper 1948-1957, exhib. cat., Melbourne: Tolarno Gallery, 1984; Sydney: Holdsworth Gallery, 1985.
- — “Letter from Italy: Arthur Boyd’s Casa Parentaio and Sculpture Park at Celle”, Art and Australia, 21:4, 1984, 448–9.
- — “London Letter”, Art and Australia, 22:2, summer 1984, 170–6.
- — “Saenredam and his Critics”, Australian Journal of Art, 4, 1985, 5–13.
- — “City Bushmen: the Heidelberg School and the Rural Mythology” [Book Review], Art and Australia, 24:3, winter 1986, 466–71.
- — “The Landscapes of Arthur Boyd”, Jillian Bradshaw Memorial Lecture, Bentley, WA: Western Australian Institute of Technology, 1986.
- — “Arthur Boyd, exhib. cat., London: Fischer Fine Art, 1986.
- — “Obituary: Dr Mary Woodall 1901-1988”, Art Bulletin of Victoria, 29, 1989, 61–3.
- — “Variation, transformation, and interpretation: Watteau and Lucian Freud”, Art Bulletin of Victoria, 31, 1990, 26–31.
- — “Arthur Boyd”, Arthur Boyd: The Magic Flute and Other Paintings, exhib. cat., Sydney: Wagner Art Gallery, 1991; New York: Pyramid Gallery, 1991.
- — “Obituary: Prof. A.D. Trendall”, Art Bulletin of Victoria, 36, 1996, 61.
- — "Greta Hort”, Australian Dictionary of Biography, Melbourne: Melbourne University Press, 1996, 14: 499–500.

== Sources ==
http://www.ursulahoff.org/ A Tribute to Dr Ursula Hoff AO OBE. Melbourne: National Gallery of Victoria, 2005 Holden, Colin. The Outsider: A Portrait of Ursula Hoff. North Melbourne, Victoria: Australian Scholarly Publishing, 2009. Palmer, Sheridan. Centre of the Periphery: Three European Art Historians in Melbourne. Nth Melbourne, Vic: Australian Scholarly Publishing, 2008. Poynter, John. Mr Felton’s Bequests. Melbourne: Miegunyah, 2003.
