= Tate Adams =

Australian artist (1922–2018)

Tate Adams AM
- Born: William Allen Adams; 22 January 1922; Holywood, Northern Ireland, UK
- Died: 8 April 2018 (aged 96); Townsville, Queensland, Australia
- Education: Central School of Art
- Movement: Printmaking
- Awards: Member of the Order of Australia; 2009

Tate Adams AM (22 January 1922 – 8 April 2018) was an Australian artist, based in Townsville, who was named a Member of the Order of Australia in 2009 for service to publishing and to the arts, particularly through contributions to the development of printmaking in Australia. In 2010 he was made the Inaugural Honorary Fellow of the Print Council of Australia.

== Early influences ==
Tate Adams was born William Allen Adams in Holywood, Northern Ireland in 1922. His first exhibition was in Northern Ireland, a joint show with Gerard Dillon organised by the Council for the Encouragement of Music and Arts. In 1949 and 1950 he took night classes at the Central School of Art in London under the British printmaker, Gertrude Hermes. In 1952 he moved to Melbourne, Australia, visiting Ireland in 1959 to spend a year working voluntarily with Liam Miller of Dolmen Press. Dolmen published his first book of engravings, Soul Cages, and on returning to Melbourne he completed linocuts to illustrate the Dolmen press reprint of Riders to the Sea.

== Teaching history ==
Tate Adams established the artist print department at the Royal Melbourne Institute of Technology in 1960 and taught there for 22 years until 1982. He was responsible for introducing professionalism into printmaking, improving the technical standard of printmaking as an art form, and championing printmaking throughout Australia. His students included George Baldessin (died in 1978 but widely acknowledged as one of Australia's best printmakers), Jock Clutterbuck, Elizabeth Cross, Tay Kok Wee and Graeme Peebles (widely acknowledged as Australia's foremost mezzotint artist). He encouraged artists to use the facilities and developed printmaking as a respected art form amongst artists such as Fred Williams, John Brack, John Olsen and Len French.

== Crossley Gallery and Crossley Print Workshop ==
To further promote printmaking as an art form, Adams established Crossley Gallery in 1966, the only commercial gallery in Australia devoted exclusively to printmaking. The gallery operated in Melbourne until 1980. A publication on the operation of the gallery, The Crossley Gallery 1966–1980 was published by Macmillan Publishers in 2003. Contributors to the book included Harry Crock, AO, Patrick McCaughey, Professor Jenny Zimmer, and Alison Broinowski. Crossley was also significant in that it introduced the work of Japanese printmakers to Australia, introducing a new aesthetic to Australian artists. Together with George Baldessin, Adams established the Crossley Print Workshop in 1973 where printmakers could produce and edition work for Crossley Gallery. Roger Kemp and John Olsen are examples.

== Lyre Bird Press ==
Following the closure of the Crossley Print Workshop in 1977, Adams and Baldessin established Lyre Bird Press to publish high-calibre livres d'artistes. Baldessin died in a car accident in 1978 while working on his first book for the Press, his Mary Magdalene drawings. Adams operated the press, continuing to produce artist books, including Diary of a Vintage in 1981, the award-winning John Brack Nudes in 1982, Seven Deadly Sins by Juli Haas in 1998, and the Palmetum in 2002. Adams moved to Townsville, Queensland in 1989 and in 1992 moved the press's operations to the College of Music, Visual Arts and Theatre at James Cook University where he became an honorary lecturer. The Press, never a commercially successful enterprise, is sustained by Adams's own funds and enthusiasm, and continues to promote the work of a spectrum of printmakers. Lyre Bird Press continues to publish books in collaboration with Jenny Zimmer of Zimmer Editions. A major touring exhibition of Lyre Bird Press – In Full Flight, organised by Perc Tucker Regional Gallery, Townsville's public gallery, toured the east coast of Australia from 2001.

== Later artistic activity ==
Tate Adams continued his own artistic practice and exhibited in his later years at Perc Tucker Regional Gallery: a major solo exhibition, Gesture, in 2002, followed by The Line in 2007 included curated work by Adams as well as a major gouache; and Elegies in 2009, a series of narrative paintings based on John Millington Synge's play, Riders to the Sea.

== Death ==
Adams died on 8 April 2018, aged 96.
