= Edith Wall =

New Zealand artist (1904–2012)

Edith Bayne
- Born: Edith Wall; 13 November 1904; Christchurch, New Zealand
- Died: 21 April 2012 (aged 107); Camberwell, Melbourne, Australia
- Known for: Painting, cartoonist, printmaking
- Spouse: Oscar Bayne
- Awards: Victorian Artists Society drawing prize (1956), Minnie Crouch prize from Bendigo Art Gallery (1971)

Edith Bayne (née Wall, 13 November 1904 – 21 April 2012) was an artist born in New Zealand who also resided in Australia.

== Biography ==
Born Edith Wall in Christchurch, New Zealand, to Gypsy and Arnold Wall, her father was a professor and broadcaster.

Wall was an early member of The Group and exhibited with them in 1927, 1928, and 1947.

In the early 1940s, Wall moved to Sydney, Australia. Wall then traveled to attend the Sorbonne in Paris and also studied art in Rome and London.

After moving to Sydney, Wall became a prolific cartoonist. She also taught art and exhibited in galleries in Melbourne and Sydney.

In the final 1965 Melbourne Contemporary Art Society show, Wall was in the company of notable members and invitees who included their leader George Bell (who died the following year), Barbara Brash, Bill Coleman, Margaret Dredge, Dorothea Francis, Inez Hutchison, Maidie McGowan, Mary Macqueen, Anne Montgomery, Harry Rosengrave, Steven Spurrier, Roma Thompson, Dorothy Stephen, and Marjorie Woolcock.

Over 6 March–30 April 1995, Mornington Peninsula Regional Gallery hosted Women on the walls: 1890s - 1990s showing Edith Wall works among those including A. M. E. Bale, Clarice Beckett, Barbara Brash, Lina Bryans, Ethel Carrick Fox, Mary Cecil Allen, Pegg Clarke, Amalie Colquhoun, Sybil Craig, Janet Cumbrae-Stewart, Aileen Dent, Margaret Baskerville, Nornie Gude, Norah Gurdon, Mary Macqueen, Marguerite Mahood, Maidie McGowan, Mary Meyer, Leopoldine Mimovich, Josephine Muntz Adams, Hilda Rix Nicholas, Helen Ogilvie, Ada May Plante, Clara Southern, Ethel Spowers, Dorothy Stephen, Constance Stokes, Eveline Syme, Violet Teague, Lesbia Thorpe, Jessie Traill, Edith Wall, Phyl Waterhouse, Dora Wilson, and Marjorie Woolcock.

== Awards ==
In 1956 Wall received the Victorian Artists Society drawing prize, and in 1971 the Minnie Crouch Prize from the Art Gallery of Ballarat.

== Personal life ==
In the mid-1930s she married Oscar Bayne, an architect from Sydney. They had one child, Cosima, born in 1937. In 1951 they moved to Melbourne, Australia.

== Collections ==
- National Gallery of Australia
- National Gallery of Victoria
- Art Gallery of Western Australia
- Christchurch Art Gallery
- Auckland War Memorial Museum
