= Dorothy Stephen =

Australian artist (1891–1974)

- Born: Dorothy Edna Hossack; 1891; Kingston upon Thames
- Died: January 10, 1974 (aged 82–83); Caulfield, Victoria
- Education: George Bell and Arnold Shore school
- Style: Modernist
- Spouse: Clive Stephen
- Children: 1

Dorothy Stephen (1891 – 10 January 1974) was a British-born Australian modernist artist active in Melbourne from the 1930s to the 1960s.

== Early life ==
Dorothy Stephen was born Dorothy Edna Hossack between January and March 1891 in Kingston upon Thames, Surrey, England.

On 5 April 1916, in Chichester Dorothy married Dr. Clive Stephen, nephew of Chief Justice Sir John and Lady Madden. Dorothy served as a V.A.D. nurse at the Allied Base Hospital with the British Red Cross and the Order of St John, and was awarded the 1914 Star in October 1917, while Clive was a captain in the Royal Army Medical Corps in England, and served in the 14th General Hospital, Wimereux, near Boulogne, in the north of France. He publicly promoted the cause of the Red Cross.

Moving to Clive's home country immediately post World War I, the Stephens lived in Elmore where he practised medicine in Central Victoria, and was Public Vaccinator for the Northern District during the Influenza Epidemic. Dorothy bore a son Val Travers (who became a medical doctor) in 1918. They left the district in February 1919 to live in High St., Prahran and later at 537 Malvern Rd., Toorak.

== Artist ==
Clive Stephen, and possibly Dorothy too, attended George Bell's Saturday afternoon classes at Selborne Road 1925–30, and exhibited with other students of the Bell and Shore school. His background as a doctor, and as a relative by marriage of the botanical artist Mrs Ellis Rowan, was noted in an Argus newspaper article on "Artists' Aliases". During this period, Clive and Dorothy conducted life-classes that attracted such artists as Will Dyson, and others in the emerging modern movement in Melbourne. During WW2 Clive served in the Citizen Military Forces.

Dorothy exhibited annually with the Victorian Artists Society, but faced the prevalent prejudice against those of her gender; of her contribution to its October 1950 Spring exhibition, critic Alan Warren offered a passing mention: "Women painters, such as Violet Mclnnes, Dora Serle, Marjorie Woolcock, Dorothy Stephen, Roma Ward, Lesley Sinclair and Mary Macqueen have produced some competent pictures in their respective spheres."

However, The Age critic remarked that Dorothy Stephen's work and that of Alan Foulkes "command attention" in the Victorian Artists Society spring exhibition of 1951, the preview of which she attended with husband Clive, Italian Consul Dr. Lucia Dianelli and Dr. Ursula Hoff. The Bulletin commented on the spring 1952 V.A.S. show that Dorothy clearly "felt something" in her Old Gardens, Chelsea, and in the autumn 1953 V.A.S. noted "a remarkably large number of pictures which show more rather than less delicacy of perception and refinement of observation. Among these may be mentioned...Dorothy Stephens’s [sic] “Gannets,” in which there is an attempt to realise the character of the objects." Arnold Shore reporting in October 1955 on the Contemporary Art Society exhibition at the V.A.S. galleries, wrote that: "Still life studies by Barbara Brash, Dorothy Stephen and Lesley Lawson play upon restrained emphasis of shape and color generally," and in September that year when she exhibited with the Victorian Artists Society spring exhibition judged by Napier Waller, Shore considered her Still Life "well-composed".

In the final 1965 Melbourne Contemporary Art Society show, Dorothy and Clive were in the company of notable members and invitees, including their leader George Bell (who died the following year), and Barbara Brash, Bill Coleman, Margaret Dredge, Dorothea Francis, Inez Hutchison, Maidie McGowan, Mary Macqueen, Anne Montgomery, Harry Rosengrave, Steven Spurrier, Roma Thompson, Edith Wall, and Marjorie Woolcock.

== Death and legacy ==
Formerly resident at 19 Avoca Street, South Yarra, Dorothy Stephen died on 10 January 1974 at Kahlyn Private Hospital, 70 Bambra Road, Caulfield.

Posthumously, Stephen's paintings have been attracting sales at auction and have been shown at significant commercial and regional galleries amongst those better known. From 19 April 1989 Eastgate Gallery, Armadale included Dorothy in a "group exhibition of important modern painters from the 1930s to the present day" with Ian Armstrong, Barbara Brash, Dorothy Braund, Jack Courier, Frances Derham, Russell Drysdale, Grahame King, Maidi McGowan, Mary Macqueen, Constance Stokes, Eric Thake, and Edith Wall among others.

The Jim Alexander Gallery, East Malvern, in its spring exhibition, 9–16 October 1989 illustrated in colour in its catalogue Stephen's Three women at work beside works by Beatrice Colquhoun, Rupert Bunny, Mary Cecil Allen, Charles Wheeler, Alexander Colquhoun, Marjorie Woolcock, and Mabel Crump, while other artists in the show included her husband Clive, Amalie Colquhoun, William Frater, Madge Freeman, Allan Jordan, Mary Macqueen, Maidie McGowan, Lucy Newell, Esther Paterson, John Shirlow, Alan Sumner, Feliks Topolski, Noel Wood, and Marjorie Woolcock.

Over 6 March–30 April 1995, Mornington Peninsula Regional Gallery hosted Women on the walls: 1890s - 1990s showing Dorothy Stephen works among those including A. M. E. Bale, Clarice Beckett, Barbara Brash, Lina Bryans, Ethel Carrick Fox, Mary Cecil Allen, Pegg Clarke, Amalie Colquhoun, Sybil Craig, Janet Cumbrae-Stewart, Aileen Dent, Margaret Baskerville, Nornie Gude, Norah Gurdon, Mary Macqueen, Marguerite Mahood, Maidie McGowan, Mary Meyer, Leopoldine Mimovich, Josephine Muntz Adams, Hilda Rix Nicholas, Helen Ogilvie, Ada May Plante, Clara Southern, Ethel Spowers, Constance Stokes, Eveline Syme, Violet Teague, Lesbia Thorpe, Jessie Traill, Edith Wall, Phyl Waterhouse, Dora Wilson, and Marjorie Woolcock.

The Sheila Foundation project 'Into the Light: Recovering Australia’s lost women artists 1870- 1960' collects data about, and through its acquisition fund, purchases artworks of, professional Australian women artists whose oeuvre has been neglected. The second year's three purchases included a modernist painting; "a Modigliani-inspired portrait of a young man, Julian, by Melbourne artist Dorothy Stephen."
