= Maidie McGowan =

Australian artist (1906–1998)

- Born: Maidie MacWhirter; 1906; England
- Died: 1998 (aged 91–92); Victoria, Australia
- Education: National Gallery School
- Known for: Painting, Drawing
- Movement: George Bell Circle
- Spouse: Colin McGowan

Maidie McGowan (née MacWhirter) (1906–1998) was an Australian artist.

== Biography ==
McGowan was born in England in 1906, and arrived in Victoria in 1920 as a teenager. She studied art at the National Gallery School under W.B. McInnes, later doing weekend classes at George Bell's Bourke Street studio in the 1930s. She studied at the Gallery School at the same time as Sybil Craig, Constance Stokes, and Helen Ogilvie, though they were in different classes. Her mother didn't want her to continue studying art, and got her to go work at a flower shop instead. Bernard Hall allowed her to continue studying part time, a privilege not afforded to many at the time.

She first exhibited with The New Group at the Athenaeum Gallery in 1937, at a show consisting of still-life, landscape, and drawings. The group consisted of artists Albert Tucker and Hal Porter, and Maidie's work The Portrait of Minka was considered second only to Tucker. A review of the show in The Herald by Basil Burdett described her work as showing real promise. McGowan's portrait Manya featured in the Herald Exhibition 'Outstanding Artists of 1937' and alongside Thea Proctor's article in Art in Australia.

McGowan attended classes at the Victorian Artists Society with her future husband Colin around this time. She was a founding member of the Contemporary Art Society and later a three-terms President of the Melbourne Society of Women Painters and Sculptors. Her and Colin married in 1948 and moved to Mount Eliza, mostly withdrawing from the art scene. They later returned in 1954 by invitation to help launch the Peninsula Arts Society. She was encouraged to return to practicing art during this time by George Bell, returning to his classes while also teaching art at Mount Eliza.

Colin worked in printing at an advertising firm, and Maidie's work Collage of Screenprinted Paper was made out of posters he screenprinted. She would gift this work to Bell on his 80th birthday. In the 1960s McGowan would become the first secretary of the McClelland Gallery Group, with Colin printing and designing the invitations and catalogues. The group's membership included artists such as Daryl Lindsay. Her work and experience led to her assisting in curation for two exhibitions at the National Gallery of Victoria in the 1960s and 1970s.

== Exhibitions ==
- April–May 1978, Paintings of Figure and Landscape by Maidie McGowan, Clive Parry Galleries
- April–May 1988, George Bell Students & Friends, Holland Fine Art
- October 1988, Jim Alexander Gallery Spring Exhibition
- May–June 1990, Modern Australian Paintings, Bridget McDonnell Gallery (with Sidney Nolan, Arthur Boyd, Charles Blackman)

=== Posthumous ===
Over 6 March–30 April 1995, Mornington Peninsula Regional Gallery hosted Women on the walls: 1890s - 1990s showing McGowan's works among those including A. M. E. Bale, Clarice Beckett, Barbara Brash, Lina Bryans, Ethel Carrick Fox, Mary Cecil Allen, Pegg Clarke, Amalie Colquhoun, Sybil Craig, Janet Cumbrae-Stewart, Aileen Dent, Margaret Baskerville, Nornie Gude, Norah Gurdon, Mary Macqueen, Marguerite Mahood, Dorothy Stephen, Mary Meyer, Leopoldine Mimovich, Josephine Muntz Adams, Hilda Rix Nicholas, Helen Ogilvie, Ada May Plante, Clara Southern, Ethel Spowers, Constance Stokes, Eveline Syme, Violet Teague, Lesbia Thorpe, Jessie Traill, Edith Wall, Phyl Waterhouse, Dora Wilson, and Marjorie Woolcock.
