= Anne Montgomery (artist) =

Australian artist, printmaker, muralist and lecturer

- Born: 1908
- Died: 1991 (aged 82–83); Sandringham, Victoria, Australia
- Known for: Painting, Printmaking, Mural Painting, Lecturing
- Parents: William Montgomery (father); May Montgomery(née Rowed) (mother)

Anne Montgomery (1908-1991) artist, printmaker, muralist, lecturer was described in 2008 as "better known in art circles than by the general public". Yet for the first three decades of her life, she exhibited widely, received commissions and was bought by a number of public collections. She also is representative of a generation of Melbourne artists whose reputations were overshadowed by the publicity generated by the Angry Penguins and Antipodean groups for themselves.

== Childhood and influences ==
Anne Montgomery grew up in the centre of Melbourne's art and design circles Her father was William Montgomery, Melbourne's leading stained glass artist from the 1880s to the 1920s, president of the Victorian Artists Society, Trustee of the National Gallery of Victoria and a keen advocate for the ideals of the Arts and Crafts Movement and the decor of the Montgomery home in Sandringham, Melbourne, reflected this taste until it was sold in the early 1990s. William Montgomery was a close friend of Bernard Hall, artist and gallery director, and Anne spent much time with Hall's children from his second marriage. The Montgomeries joined Bernard Hall's summer painting landscape painting camps at Rosebud.

Her mother, May Rowed, was William Montgomery's younger second wife and a former student of the Melbourne National Gallery of Victoria School. Although marriage reduced her time for artwork, May Montgomery stayed in direct contact with many of the major women artists of Edwardian Melbourne, including Josephine Muntz Adams, Jessie Traill, Dora Wilson, Violet Teague, Lillian White and the Sri-Lankan Australian artist Isabel van Stavern. She also painted oriental style flowerpieces and designed costumes for amateur theatricals, fancy dress balls and tableaux, including fundraising events during World War One for the Victorian Artist Society. Mother and daughter designed and made masks for the pastoral play at the 1932 Mayoral Ball in Melbourne organised by Louise Hanson Dyer for her brother Harold Glengoult Smith, when the Melbourne Town Hall was filled with autumn leaves gathered from Melbourne's parks and gardens.

Although Anne Montgomery's early childhood was dominated by the death of her elder half-brother, artist Mont Montgomery, in action on the western front during the First World War, she grew up observing publicly active women artists, who became firstly role models and then later professional colleagues. In turn she began attending classes at the National Gallery of Victoria School under the directorship of Bernard Hall before she had finished secondary school at the Melbourne Church of England Girls Grammar School, the grounds of her old school later provided her with a subject for one of her etchings. Montgomery came second to Eileen Robertson in the 1932 Travelling Scholarship competition at the Gallery School.

== Mural painting ==
Realising that she needed to turn her art skills to a more practical end and the need to support her widowed mother, Montgomery enrolled in architectural studies and Napier Waller's mural painting classes. She was one of a group of his students who worked on the murals for Melbourne's Grossi Florentino restaurant in 1934, This is one of her few surviving mural commissions, but the design and style of the works more strongly reflect Waller than any of his students. Anne Montgomery was listed as the leader of a group of students who painted murals in 1934 for the Children's ward at the After Care Hospital in Victoria Street, with art materials donated by Jessie Traill, She painted a number of murals from the 1930s to the 1950s, Most of her murals have been lost in demolitions or refits of buildings and included the large scenes of Greek Gods flanking the proscenium of the Civic Theatre Ashburton in Melbourne's Southeast, c 1947-8. By 1935 Montgomery was teaching occasionally in the Art School at the Royal Melbourne Institute of Technology and had moved c 1937 to the Architecture School where she would remain for 39 years, teaching watercolour and rendering techniques to Architecture students. Towards the end of the 1930s she began attending George Bell's classes at his Burke Street school, although his teaching did not impact greatly on her artmaking until the later 1940s.

== Printmaking ==
After she finished at the National Gallery School she spent several weeks with Jessie Traill learning etching, including spending time at Traill's Harkaway studio. She followed many of Jessie Traill's radical techniques such as experimenting with dramatic inking of the plates and also explored coloured effects and aquatint. However Anne Montgomery emphasised a more decorative fantasy approach to subject matter than Traill, with reference to Art Nouveau and Art Deco. She showed prints in a joint exhibition with Helen Ogilvie in 1933. This tendency towards stylish fantasy linked into her practice of painting on silk and on the reverse of glass plates in the 1930s. Many of the latter survive but very few of her works on silk. Later she would also illustrate children's books with similar decorative styling. A few linocuts also date from the 1930s. Overall she appears to have stopped printmaking after the second world war.

== Early success in the 1930s ==
The first decade of Anne Montgomery's career placed her as one of the most admired emerging artists in 1930s Melbourne, described in 1933 as "one of the white hopes" of Australian art by Harold Herbert, she exhibited widely in the Melbourne Society of Women Painters and Sculptors, the Victorian Artists Society, the Arts and Crafts society, the New Melbourne Art Club, the Australian Watercolour Institute and the Twenty Melbourne Painters (as a guest). She established a studio in the Olderfleet buildings with Lucy Newell which became an important meeting place for many young artists in Melbourne including Treania Smith, Constance Coleman, Marna Pestell and Geoff Jones. William Pate recalled that Anne Montgomery's city studio was the location for sketching and drawing sessions during the 1930s. Montgomery, Newell and Traill toured Tasmania in 1935. Another colleague who shared her interest in the fanciful and decorative was potter Klytie Pate and the two women held a well-received joint exhibition at Kozminsky Galleries, Melbourne in 1943 opened by opened by Harold Brown head of the art school at the Technical College. More unexpected contacts from her early working life were Merle and Roger Kemp. She painted Merle Kemp's portrait c1940 and knew both Merle and Roger Kemp through teaching at the Melbourne Technical College, later RMIT. By 1940, Montgomery's works had been acquired by the National Gallery of Victoria, Castlemaine Art Gallery and the Howard Hinton collection (NERAM). A further purchase by the Art Gallery of New South Wales in 1940, has since been deaccessioned.

== Later 1940s and onwards ==
Montgomery's public visibility rapidly changed in the 1940s. She became increasingly aligned with George Bell and his oppositional stance to the emerging expressionist and free-er aesthetic seen among the most radical Melbourne artists. Her public exhibitions were generally within Bell's circle and among his supporters, including the Melbourne Contemporary Artist group and the invitation-only George Bell group. The styles of Bell's later art school at Selbourne Road, Toorak, with the hard edged pictorial elements and flat synthetic cubism completely overwrote her earlier style. She was an enthusiastic and assiduous student and for most of the "homework" assignments that Bell set, Montgomery produced fully developed artworks, rather than sketches and provisional studies. Her colours became darker. arbitrary and more dramatic, often lending an overtone of surrealism to the Australian landscape. She painted in Victorian alps with Lucy Newell and Mollie Hill, who was based at Bright, both friends from the National Gallery School, camping in stockmen's and cross-country skier's huts. !n 1954 she was still painting several times a year at Mount Hotham. She also began to produce pastels in this later abstracting style, often with bright colours on dark-toned paper. The new building of the Lyceum Club in Ridgeway Place Melbourne, designed by Ellison Harvie and completed in 1959 included a large mural by Montgomery of Magnolias.

During the postwar years Montgomery worked alongside and was friend of many of the major classical modernists of the 1950s including Dorothy Mary Braund, Nancy Grant, Guelda Pyke, Constance Stokes, Eveline Syme (part of whose studio contents she inherited), Geoff Jones, Frances Derham, Barbara Brash and Mary Cecil Allen. She also drew portraits of a number of these women artists; the portrait of Pyke is now at the State Library of Victoria. Helen Ogilvie, who was both a gallerist and a classical modernist, also validated Montgomery, who showed at Ogilvie's Peter Bray Gallery during the 1950s. Yet Montgomery and her family were too closely associated with Bernard Hall to enjoy the endorsement that Ogilvie enjoyed from Daryl Lindsay, Ursula Hoff and the Grimwades.

For the final 1965 Melbourne Contemporary Art Society show, Montgomery was in the company of notable members and invitees who included George Bell, Barbara Brash, Bill Coleman, Margaret Dredge, Dorothea Francis, Inez Hutchison, Maidie McGowan, Mary Macqueen, Dorothy Stephen, Harry Rosengrave, Steven Spurrier, Roma Thompson, Edith Wall, and Marjorie Woolcock. With the death of George Bell in 1966, the promotion of classical modernism dissipated, critics beginning to think the academic cubism of Bell's circle was passé even by the mid 1950s, and thus Anne Montgomery's public status began to dwindle, along with many colleagues.

Stylistically her work slowly defaulted to her earlier decorative style, and she continued to paint until the late 1980s. She returned frequently to her favorite subject, studies of the coastline around Sandringham, where she and her mother lived, Ricketts Point and Half Moon Bay, as well as decorative flower pieces, ti-tree, banksias and studies of Magnolias. These subjects sustained her from the late 1920s to the late 1980s, as she produced her last known works for the Form and Flowers, group exhibition in 1989 and the Alice 125 exhibition in 1990.

The growing curatorial interest in Bell's students saw Montgomery's work return to public sight. She was featured in the early comprehensive monograph on the George Bell School by Jan Minchin and Mary Eagle, 1981 and in Felicity St John Moore's survey of Bell and his students presented at the National Gallery of Victoria 1992, shortly after her death. In 1989 her work, along with that of other Bell pupils, Maidie McGowan and Marjorie Woolcock, toured to three Victorian regional galleries in the Form and Flowers Exhibition.

Two posthumous survey exhibitions of Anne Montgomery's work have been held, one in a Melbourne commercial gallery in 1992 which offered a large range of work for sale, and another loan exhibition at the Lyceum Club in 2008. Recently works have been acquired by other public collections including Ballarat, Bendigo, Geelong, the State Library of Victoria (gift of the Montgomery family) and the National Gallery of Australia (prints).
