= Margaret Dredge =

Australian artist (1928–2001)

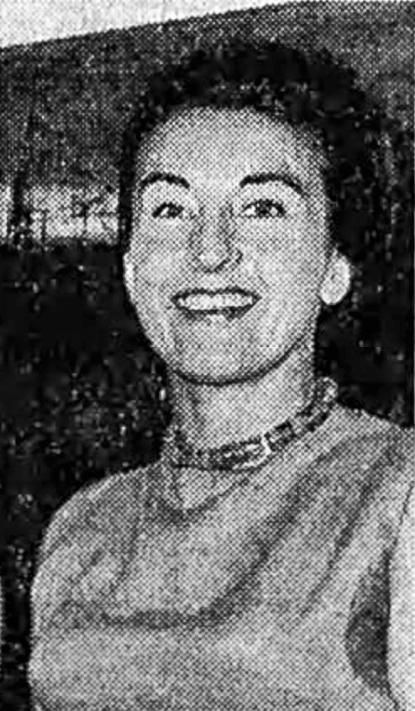
Margaret Dredge at the opening of her solo show at Three Sisters Gallery

Margaret Anne Dredge (27 January 1928 – 3 September 2001) was an Australian painter and printmaker, active from the mid-1950s until 1997, and teacher of art.

== Early life ==
Dredge was born in Murrumbeena in 1928, daughter of a war veteran, the accountant William Arthur Vickery who brought her up after her mother Annie (née Ashby) and her second child died in 1930 during childbirth. They moved frequently, boarding mainly in Albert Park and South Yarra, then settled in bayside Sandringham where she attended the State School. Her father's fortunes as a freelance accountant improved despite the Great Depression and starting in 1940 she studied and attained her leaving certificate at Methodist Ladies College, and left with ambitions to study art at the National Gallery School, but at her father's insistence went into secretarial work at the Commonwealth Bank. Over 6 months in 1948-50 she worked as a secretary in Sydney before returning to nurse her ageing father. At the Commonwealth Bank she met bank clerk and builder Peter John Dredge, whom she married in 1950 and lived at 34 Codrington Street, Sandringham. Her first children Rhonda and Lesley were born 1951 and 1954 respectively.

== Training ==
In the mid-1950s Dredge studied initially with Inez Hutchinson and made figurative works before moving on to abstraction. By 1958 she had become a member of, and exhibited with, the Beaumaris Art Group, and after the birth of her third child Peter in February 1959, she took art classes with Australian abstract painter/printmaker Robert Grieve which encouraged her move to abstraction.

== Career and reception ==
In the early 1960s Dredge joined the Contemporary Artists Society (CAS), and was on its council, and the Melbourne Contemporary Artists (MCA), greatly expanding her contact with the art world; between 1961 and 1979 she held five solo shows, the first two being in 1964 at Peter Burrows Gallery and Three Sisters Gallery, and entered art awards.

An early review by Bernard Smith of her contribution to a Melbourne Contemporary Artists show in 1963 was ambivalent, but constructive; "Wimmera by Margaret Dredge, is boldly handled and dramatic in handling. But...there is an evenness of accent and an over-stylisation of the composition which robs the painting of tension and surprise."

Dredge began teaching at the Beaumaris Art Group and held life classes at her own home. She was befriended by architect Gavin Hughes when he purchased a work from her, and his encouragement and mentorship furthered her exposure to literature, music and architecture. Hughes and his partner Max Dingle in 2008 bequeathed most of Dredge's works exhibited at her 2012 retrospective to the Shoalhaven City Arts Centre.

Favourable reviews of her 1965 one-person exhibition at the Argus Gallery by Alan McCulloch and Bernard Smith enhanced her reputation, and when she showed at Pinacotheca in 1967 Ken Bandman set her amongst the 'post-painterly' abstractionists.

"The main characteristic of her work is the severe discipline of line and her brush work. Squares, lines and other geometrical patterns are crossing, overlaying or cutting each other, in bright and vibrant colours, mainly pleasing to the eye. There is an indication of texture there, but texture is not Miss Dredge's forte. It is rather that rigidness of line, that hard-edgedness, and the definite intent of her design that make her work come alive."

This attention was followed in Margaret Garlick's review of the 1965 show of the Melbourne Contemporary Art Society which she called 'depressing,' but singled out Dredge's as among "the best paintings" that "showed an understanding of forms within the chosen shape of the canvas. They tended to be rather bold abstracts, like Margaret Dredge's two paintings with strong shapes and bold colors..."

Ann Galbally was impressed with Dredge's Nuns at Dawn, commended in the Inez Hutchinson Award at the Beaumaris Art Group Studio in May 1970, "as a taut spatial structure firmly controlled by a sophisticated understanding of the possibilities of line and plane."

Also during this period and until the mid-seventies, to support her children's education and with her ailing father living with the family until his death in 1975, she returned to work as a secretary. From mid-1969 Dredge advertised 10-week 'Painting Classes' with an 'emphasis on creativity and design' in her Sandringham studio. She became politically active, joining Jean McLean's and Joan Coxsedge's Save Our Sons to actively oppose the Vietnam War and through her letter-writing to newspapers protested censorship, conscription, artists' treatment by critics particularly Patrick McCaughey's, and supported feminist issues, delivered a lengthy retort to Thelma Forshaw's criticism of Germaine Greer's The Female Eunuch, and pressed for abortion law reform.

In 1973 Dredge deviated from hard-edge abstract painting and, switching from oils to acrylics, made work that was expressionist. A trip to Indonesia 1976/77 may have influenced this change. The use of acrylics was a focus of "Non-representational Painting" classes she began to teach at the Council for Adult Education, Melbourne city, from 1979 to 1998, holding an exhibition of student paintings there in 1983.

She held a last solo exhibition at Gryphon Gallery in 1979, of which Graeme Sturgeon commented; "with this exhibition, Margaret Dredge has assumed a place among the top dozen women working in Melbourne" Earlier that year, she was interviewed on the topic of women artists by Harry Martin on ABC radio's Saturday Review series on the arts, and in June 1980 presented on her work at the Council of Adult Education series 'Meet the Artist'. She assisted Ken Scarlett, director of Gryphon Gallery with his compilation of his Australian Sculptors. The Dredge family relocated in 1980 to 49 Richmond Terrace in inner-suburban Richmond, and since at first she lacked a studio, she studied etching with Bill Young, Maggie May, Geoffrey Goldie, Jon Cattapan and John Spooner and also used the services of Bill Young to print editions. In a new studio built by her husband in 1983, Dredge was able to work more intensively and on a larger scale. Her painting became more calligraphic with a move to all-over abstract compositions in the last years of her life and until she ceased painting in 1997 due to a cardiac condition.

Writing in the 1990s, art historian Christopher Heathcote responded to Dredge's late work:

"The solemn emotional import of these, her final completed works, is unmistakable. This is the visual equivalent of blues music. The paint is gathered into simple, yet inexplicably moving structures of sombre form that act upon the sensitive viewer as a psychological medium, a melancholy transport. Technically, it would be incorrect to describe the broad strokes in black and white acrylic as calligraphic; and yet these late works by the artist are, indeed, true to the intention of Chinese calligraphy. There is a raw emotional honesty to the movement of the brush: it seems directly to convey the inner emotions of the solitary artist, her inner passions, thoughts, joys, and anxieties."

Husband Peter died in March 2000, and Margaret herself died on 3 September 2001, leaving a number of works that had yet to be exhibited. She was survived by her children Rhonda, Lesley and Peter who arranged for her late work to be exhibited and retrospectives to be shown.

== Exhibitions ==
=== Solo ===
- 1964, 14 March: Peter Burrows Gallery, Queens Rd, Melbourne (first solo)
- 1964, 18 November – 9 December: Margaret Dredge : Oils, The Three Sisters Gallery, 46 Church Street, Brighton
- 1965, 19 July: Margaret Dredge paintings, Robert Langley terracotta sculpture, Argus Gallery, Melbourne
- 1965, 31 October – 20 November: Joint exhibition with June Stephenson, The Three Sisters Gallery
- 1967, 24 September – 13 October. Margaret Dredge, Paintings
- 1979, 26 March – 12 April: Margaret Dredge : Paintings 1978-79, Gryphon Gallery, Melbourne State College, 757 Swanston Street, Carlton

=== Group ===
- 1961, 16 April: Contemporary Art Society members Suzanne Dance, Patti G. Holden, Margaret Dredge, Robert Rooney, Patrick Krebs, Martin Dubaut, Barry Skinner, Bernie Bragg, Alfred Watson, S. L. Waldron, Trevor Lahiff, Brian Crawford, Peter Wood, and W. G. Elliott. Eastside Gallery, 3 Palmer St., Jolimont
- 1961, August: Eastside Gallery East Melbourne Beaumaris Art Group
- 1961, 21 August: 50 members in Melbourne Contemporary Artists 1962 Exhibition, including women Mary McQueen, Edith Wall, Clothilde Atyeo, Valeria Albiston, Christine Aldor, Mignonne Armstrong, Barbara Brash, Margaret Benwell, Yvonne Cohen, Joyce Donovan, Margaret Dredge, Dorothea Francis. Peggy Fauser, Marion Fletcher, Nancy Grant, Rosa Garlick, Inez Hutchison, Evelyn McCutcheon, Joan Marks, Maidie McGowan, Lucy Newell, Yvonne Pettengell, Guelda Pyke and Ellen Rubbo. opened by Prof. Joseph Burke Burke, Argus Gallery Melbourne
- 1961, 6 November: Argus Gallery, Melbourne Contemporary Art Society (Vic)
- 1962, 21 March: Ballarat Fine Art Gallery, Crouch Prize Exhibition
- 1962, 13 August: Argus Gallery Melbourne Melbourne Contemporary Artists
- 1962, 25 February: Argus Gallery Melbourne Contemporary Art Society (Vic) Annual Interstate Exhibition
- 1963, 12 August: Melbourne Contemporary Artists 1963 Exhibition, with women artists including Anne Montgomery, Evelyn McCutcheon, Mary McQueen, Edith Wall, Barbara Brash, Margaret Dredge, Marion Fletcher, Marjorie Woolcock, Constance Stokes and Guelda Pyke. Argus Gallery Melbourne
- 1963: Leveson Street Gallery Melbourne
- 1964, 29 February: Argus Gallery Melbourne Contemporary Art Society (Vic) Annual Interstate Exhibition
- 1964, 24 August: Argus Gallery Melbourne Melbourne Contemporary Artists
- 1964, March: Peter Burrows Gallery Melbourne
- 1964, 12 April: Argus Gallery Melbourne Contemporary Art Society (Vic)
- 1964, 16 August: Argus Gallery Melbourne, Melbourne Contemporary Artists
- 1964: Eltham Art Show
- 1964: Argus Gallery Melbourne Contemporary Art Society (Vic)
- 1964, 29 April: Beaumaris Art Gallery Inez Hutchison Prize
- 1964: Geelong Art Gallery Corio Prize
- 1964, 27 May: Argus Gallery Melbourne Contemporary Art Society (Vic) Annual Interstate Exhibition
- 1965, February: Small show of paintings by Robert Traver, June Stephenson, and Margaret Dredge. Peter Burrowes and Associates studio.
- 1965, April: Annual Inter-State Exhibition of the Contemporary Art Society, with Erica McGilchrist, Doreen Folkerts, Brian Kewley, Joan O'Loughlin, Ellen Rubbo, June Stephenson, Rosa Garlick, Gareth Sansom, Ronald Kirk, Pat Shannon and others
- 1965, 16–27 August: Contemporary Art Society (Vic), invitees included George Bell, Barbara Brash, Bill Coleman, Dorothy Stephen, Dorothea Francis, Inez Hutchison, Maidie McGowan, Mary Macqueen, Anne Montgomery, Harry Rosengrave, Steven Spurrier, Roma Thompson, Edith Wall, and Marjorie Woolcock. The Argus Gallery
- 1965, November: Eltham Art Prize, with Gareth Jones Roberts, Peter Miller, Robert Grieve, Lindsay Edward, Arch Cuthberton, Sam Fullbrook, Neil Douglas and Brian Kewley. Eltham Shire Hall
- 1966, March: Contemporary Art Society (Vic), The Argus Gallery
- 1968, 27 May: Argus Gallery Melbourne Contemporary Art Society (Vic) Annual Interstate Exhibition
- 1968, 21 October: Mildura Art Centre Contemporary Art Society (Vic)
- 1968, 6 November: Farmers Blaxland Gallery Sydney Contemporary Art Society (NSW) Annual Interstate Exhibition
- 1968, 17 November: The Australian Environment Toorak Gallery Melbourne Contemporary Art Society (Vic)
- 1969, 22 June: Toorak Gallery Melbourne Contemporary Art Society (Vic) Annual Interstate Exhibition
- 1970, Inez Hutchison Award Exhibition, Beaumaris Art Group
- 1975, May–June: Clive Parry Gallery Beaumaris Opening exhibition
- 1975, 8 June: Inez Hutchison Prize, Clive Parry Gallery Beaumaris
- 1975: Tasmanian Museum & Art Gallery 19th Invitation Exhibition
- 1975, February: Mask Show Mildura Art Centre (sculpture)
- 1975, 14 May: Shire of Flinders Art Award
- 1975, 15 May: Swan Hill Pioneer Art Award
- 1975, 6 June: Inez Hutchison Prize, Clive Parry Gallery Beaumaris
- 1977, 22 February: Mixed Show, Clive Parry Gallery Beaumaris
- 1977, 19 November: Gold Coast City Art Prize
- 1978: Tasmanian Museum & Art Gallery 21st Invitation
- 1980: Profile Gallery Print Exhibition
- 1981: Warrnambool Art Gallery Henri Worland Memorial Print Award
- 1982, 29 March: Personal Directions, prints, with Christine Chappell and Geoffrey Goldie, Gryphon Gallery
- 1992, December: Outside/ Inside, Charles Nodrum Richmond

=== Posthumous ===
- 2003, 8 October – 15 November: Margaret Dredge : An Abstract, Deakin University ICON Museum of Art
- 2005, to 30 July: Margaret Dredge: Impulses of the Mind selected works 1985-2001, Span Galleries
- 2009: Personal Journeys : 40 years of Australian Women's Abstract Art, Shoalhaven City Arts Centre
- 2010: Black is the Colour … Shoalhaven City Arts Centre
- 2012: Less is More: More or Less Shoalhaven City Arts Centre
- 2013, 2 April – 21 May: Margaret Dredge – Retrospective 1960 to 2001, Shoalhaven City Arts Centre

== Awards ==
- 1966 Inez Hutchison Prize - Commended
- 1975 Inez Hutchison Prize - Commended
- 1975 Shire of Flinders Art Award - Co-winner
- 1978 Tasmanian Museum & Art Gallery

== Collections ==
- Artbank
- Ballarat Fine Art Gallery
- Council of Adult Education
- Deakin University
- Geelong Art Gallery
- Ian Potter Collection, University of Melbourne
- McClelland Gallery
- Monash University
- Shire of Flinders
- Shoalhaven Regional Gallery – M G Dingle & G B Hughes Collection Bequest
- Tasmanian Museum & Art Gallery
- Commonwealth Banking Corporation
