= Dorothea Francis =

Australian artist

- Born: 1903
- Died: 1975 (aged 71–72)
- Education: George Bell School
- Known for: Painting, Book illustration

Dorothea Francis (1903–1975) was an Australian artist.

== Biography ==
A painter and illustrator, Francis studied under Miss Nankivell and Catherine Hardess in Melbourne. She later studied with her sister Margaret at the George Bell School. She exhibited with the Melbourne Society of Women Painters and Sculptors and the Melbourne Contemporary Artists winning a prize from the former in 1937. She showed alongside other female artists such as Lina Bryans and Isabel Tweddle. Francis illustrated an early Australian version of Alice in Wonderland in 1937. Her first solo exhibition was in Mornington in 1955. She did exhibit with the Victorian Artists Society in 1946 with Dora Serle and Alan Sumner. With her work "Composition" it was said it "weaves the figures of a woman, a child and a dog in a fruit-shop into a rhythmical design, carried out in patches of clear colour."

In the final 1965 Melbourne Contemporary Art Society show, Dorothea was in the company of notable members and invitees who included George Bell (who died the following year), Barbara Brash, Bill Coleman, Margaret Dredge, Dorothy Stephen, Inez Hutchison, Maidie McGowan, Mary Macqueen, Anne Montgomery, Harry Rosengrave, Steven Spurrier, Roma Thompson, Edith Wall, and Marjorie Woolcock.

Francis has works in the collections of the State Library Victoria and the Heide Museum of Modern Art.
