= Lucy Newell =

Lucy Newell may refer to:

- Lucy Newell (artist) (1906–1987), Australian painter and textile artist
- Lucy Newell (footballer) (born 2006), English professional footballer
