= Clive Stephen =

Australian sculptor, painter and medical doctor (1889–1957)

Dr. Clive T. Stephen
- Born: November 10, 1889; Caulfield, Victoria
- Died: April 17, 1957 (aged 67); Melbourne
- Education: George Bell School
- Alma mater: University of Melbourne (Medicine)
- Known for: modernist sculpture
- Movement: Modernism
- Spouse: Dorothy Edna
- Children: 1
- Parent(s): Sidney James Henry Stephen; Blanche Travers
- Relatives: John Madden (nephew); Ellis Rowan (sister-in-law)

Clive Travers Stephen (10 November 1889 – 17 April 1957) was an Australian sculptor, painter in water-colour and oils, printmaker, and medical doctor.

== Early life ==
Clive Stephen was born in Caulfield on 10 November 1889, the son of Blanche (née Travers) and Sidney James Henry Stephen, a solicitor, of 'The Pines' in Middle Crescent, Brighton.He is also the brother of 3 siblings.

== Physician ==
Stephen studied medicine at the University of Melbourne in Ormond College, entered third year in 1912, and attained the Bachelor of Medicine and Bachelor of Surgery with Third Class Honours in 1914. He was resident medical officer of the Alfred Hospital

=== World War I ===
Stephen enlisted in the Royal Army Medical Corps in England and was posted to the 14th General Hospital, Wimereux, near Boulogne, in the north of France. Stephen publicly promoted the cause of the Red Cross. He was made an Army Captain in March 1915, and in mid-1916 married Dorothy Edna Hossack in Chichester. His brother, Lieutenant Kenneth Travers Stephen was killed in France in May 1918.

=== Post-war ===
Stephen lived in Elmore and practised medicine in Central Victoria, and was Public Vaccinator for the Northern District during the Influenza Epidemic. There his wife, Dorothy Edna, a painter and printmaker, bore a son Val Travers (who became a medical doctor) in 1918. He left the district in February 1919 to live in High St., Prahran and later at 537 Malvern Rd., Toorak. During WW2 Stephen served in the Citizen Military Forces.

== Artist ==
=== Training ===
Stephen attended George Bell's Saturday afternoon classes at Selborne Road 1925–30, but otherwise was a self-taught painter and sculptor. His background as a doctor, and as nephew of Chief Justice John Madden and a relative by marriage of Ellis Rowan, was noted in an Argus newspaper article on "Artists' Aliases".

=== Reception ===
When in 1933 he exhibited with other students of Bell and Arnold Shore's school, Blamire Young commented that "Clive Stephen [...] has a sound method of putting a design together. His colored drawings are rich and full of promise." During the same period, Stephen and his wife Dorothy conducted life-classes that attracted such artists as Will Dyson, and others in the nascent modern movement in Melbourne. In the late 1930s he exhibited with the association of Modernist sculptors formed in 1935 by Ola Cohn, who named themselves The Plastic Group, and he also showed with Group Twelve.

McCulloch attributes influences on Stephen to primitive sculpture via European artists such as Jacob Epstein and Henri Gaudier-Brzeska, resulting in his abstraction. He was one of the first Australian stone-carvers thus inspired. Gino Nibbi in Art in Australia of 1939 notes that he;

"...tends by culture and temperament towards abstract art. After searching, let us say, on the surface of his material, by carving its external coat, he begins now to cut it, to excavate into it, to free from it some secret, without which sculpture is in danger of remaining at the bas-relief stage, and of being too elusive. Stephen is a gifted artist showing great potentiality of further development."

== Legacy ==
Stephen was also an ardent collector; as early as 1934 he acquired Head of a woman (1933), painted in Bali by Ian Fairweather (likewise an artist influenced by the primitives), which he gifted to the National Gallery of Victoria in 1948.

Stephen died 17 April 1957 after retiring from medicine to devote his life to sculpture.

== Collections ==
- National Gallery of Australia
- National Gallery of Victoria
- Art Gallery of New South Wales
- Queensland Art Gallery
- Art Gallery of Western Australia

== Exhibitions ==
- 1939, 30 May – 10 June: Plastic Group – sculpture and drawings. With Ola Cohn, Edith Hughston, Moya Carey, Ethel Reynolds, Val Blogg, M. McChesney Matthews, C. de Gruchy, Nellie Patterson. Victorian Artists' Society Gallery, East Melbourne
- 1937, 7–18 September: Plastic Group – an exhibition of sculpture, with Ola Cohn, Nellie Patterson, Moya Carey, Christine de Gruchy, Val Blogg, M. McChesney Matthews, Reg. Cordia, Edith Moore, the late John K. Blogg, Michael O'Connell. Hogan's Gallery, 340 Little Collins Street, Melbourne
- 1936, June: Group Twelve. Athenaeum Gallery
- 1933, July: Students of George Bell's and Arnold Shore, Atheneum Gallery

=== Posthumous ===
- 2012, McClelland Sculpture Park + Gallery
- 1996, from 28 April: Clive Stephen : sculpture & works on paper, including works in oil and on paper by Dorothy Stephen. Eastgate Gallery
- 1992: Classical Modernism: The George Bell Circle, National Gallery of Victoria
- 1991, 17–28 April: The George Bell Group exhibition. A tribute to George Bell. Eastgate Gallery, 729 High St., Armadale
- 1988: The Great Australian Art Exhibition
- 1986: Frances Derham, Ethel Spowers and Clive Stephens. Jim Alexander Gallery, 13 Elmo Road, East Malvern
- 1980-1: Melbourne woodcuts and linocuts of the 1920's and 1930's. Ballarat Fine Art Gallery travelling exhibition curated by Roger Butler. Toured by AGDC to McClelland Art Gallery, University of Queensland Art Gallery, Newcastle Region Art Gallery, Victorian College of the Arts Gallery, Ballarat Fine Art Gallery
- 1978: Clive Stephen, sculptor. Gryphon Gallery
- 1959, from 10 February: Memorial exhibition, National Gallery of Victoria
