= Lesbia Thorpe =

Australian artist

- Born: 15 March 1919; Elsternwick, Victoria
- Died: 2009 (age c. 90); Ninderry, Queensland
- Known for: Painting; Printmaking

Lesbia Thorpe (in private life Lee Baldwin) (1919–2009) was an Australian artist, possibly best known for her printmaking.

From 1931 to 1937 Thorpe studied under Dattilo Rubbo, and was elected in 1937 to the Painter-Etchers Society and in 1943 to the Royal Art Society.

Known as Lee Thorpe when working for the ABC, Thorpe was a freelance interviewer and host for ABC’s Women’s Session radio in the 1950s. Thorpe also travelled to Malta in 1955 to perform a radio show for the BBC in 1955. Interested in theatre, Thorpe performed for a couple of years with Doris Fitton at the Independent Theatre. From 1941, Thorpe executed murals and theatre sets for the Independent Theatre and the Theatre Royal in 1944 with William Constable, as well as executing murals for the Stage Door Canteen, Sydney.

In 1953 she studied printmaking with Gertrude Hermes at the Central School of Art and Design in London. In 1954 she was elected an associate member of the Society of Wood Engravers of Great Britain. While in 1960, on a second visit to London, she was elected a member of the Royal Graphic Art Society.

In the Summer Olympics of 1956 held in Melbourne, Thorpe exhibited in the Olympic Fine Arts Exhibition under the Drawings and Prints category with the lino-cut Emu Chicks which was bought by the Art Gallery of Western Australia in the same year.

In a long life of making art, Thorpe also illustrated books ("People of the Dreamtime", "The Cruise of the Roebuck"), and made theatre sets and was still holding exhibitions in 1994. She won the Maud Vizard Wholoham Print Prize in 1958 and 1964. She was a finalist in the 1938 Archibald Prize, with two works: Mrs Havelock Southwick and Miss Rose Broit.

== Collections ==
Works by Thorpe are held in the National Gallery of Australia (131 works), the Lawrence Wilson Art Gallery of UWA, the National Gallery of Victoria (7 works), and in the John Passmore Museum of Art (Wrobel Art Collection).
