= Lawrence Wilson Art Gallery =

Art gallery at University of Western Australia

Coordinates: 31.9769°S 115.8161°E

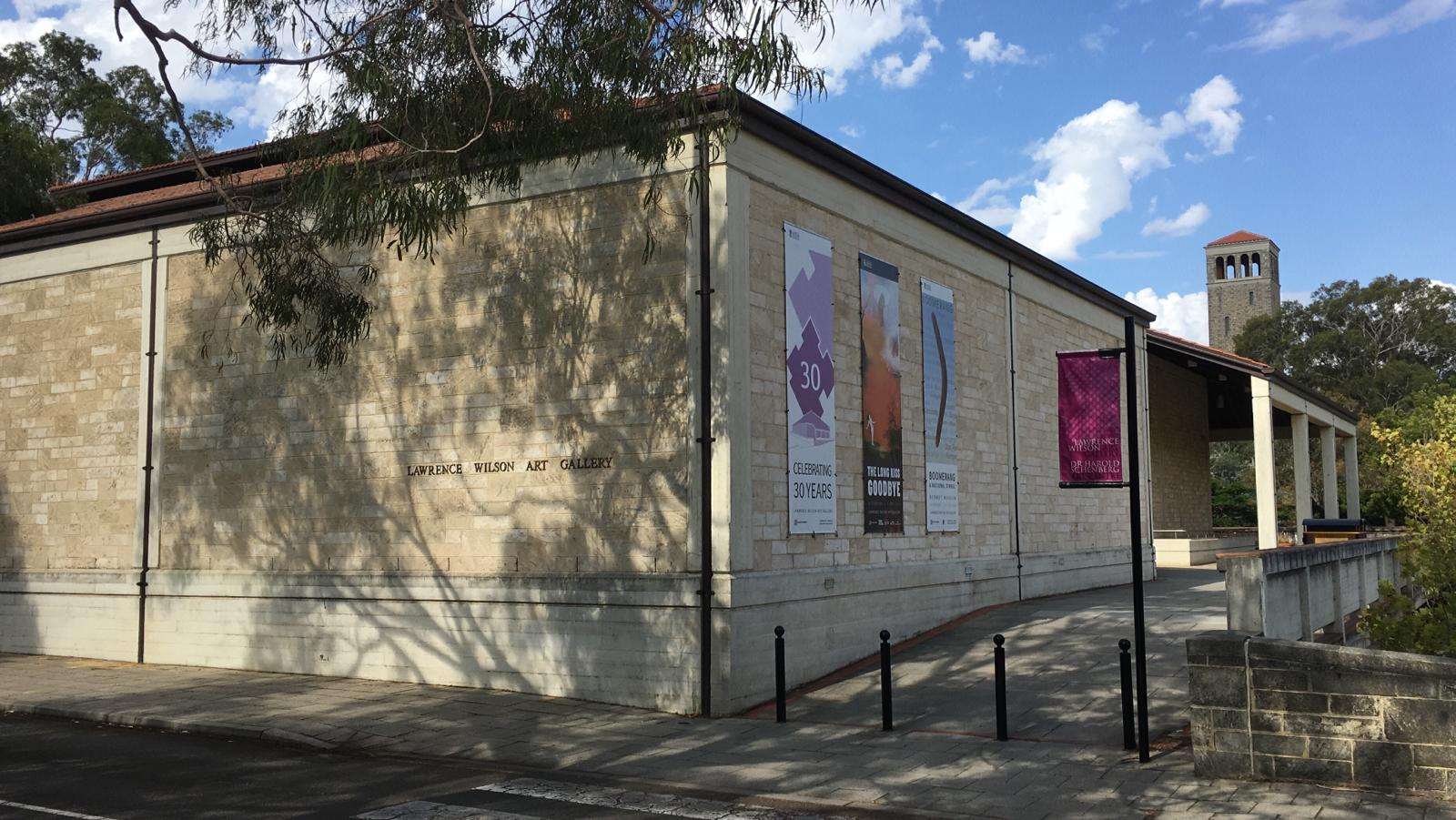
Gallery building at the south west corner

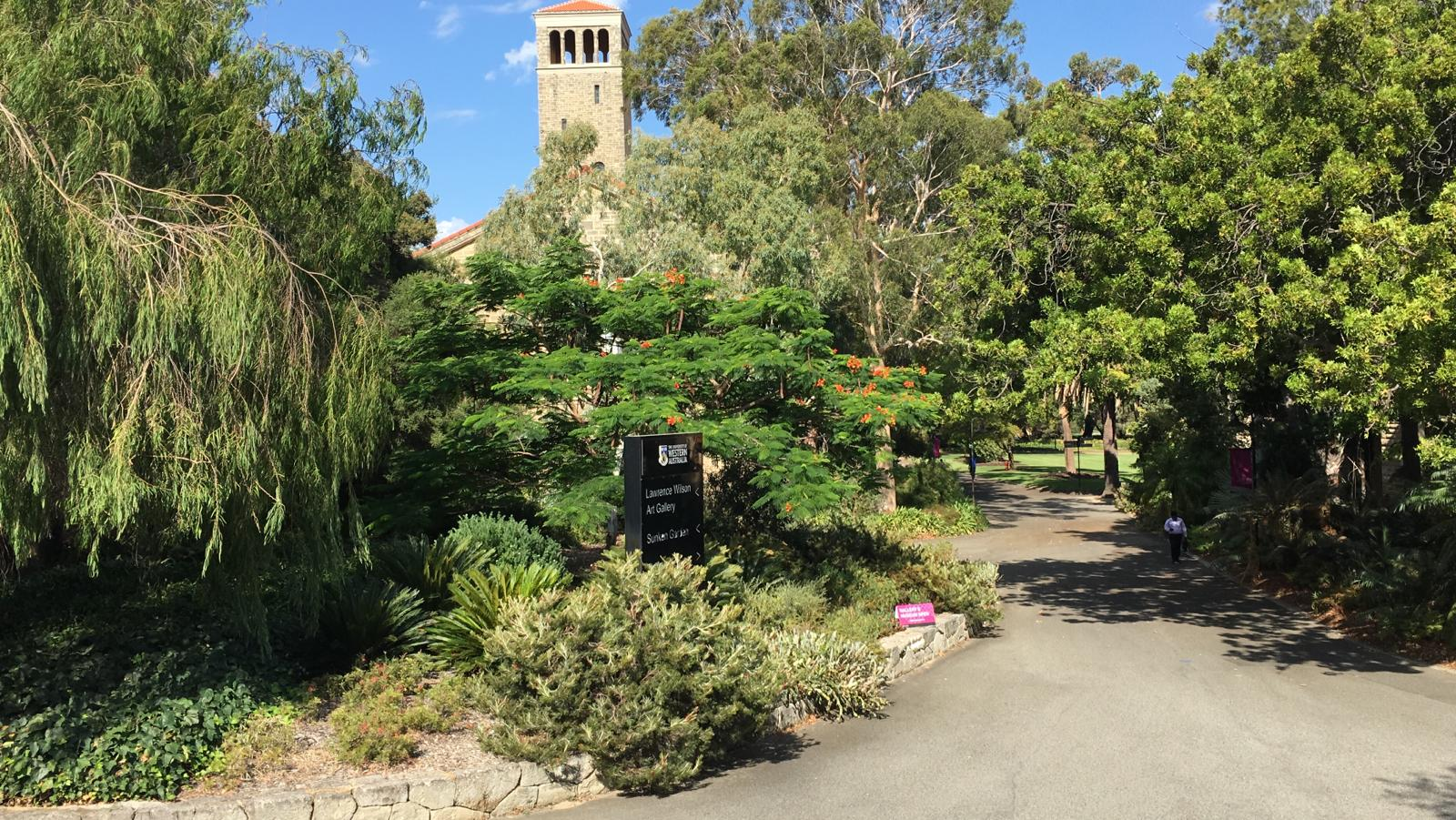
View from gallery across southern side of the sunken garden, and towards the Winthrop Tower

The Lawrence Wilson Art Gallery is an on-campus art gallery at the University of Western Australia in Crawley. The University began raising funds for the construction of a gallery in the 1980s. Opening in July 1990, it was Australia's first purpose-built university art museum and was designed by Western Australian architect Gus Ferguson.

The Lawrence Wilson Art Gallery is home to three major collections:

- the University of Western Australia Art Collection
- the Cruthers Collection of Women's Art
- the Berndt Museum of Anthropology

The gallery is supported by a friends of organisation.

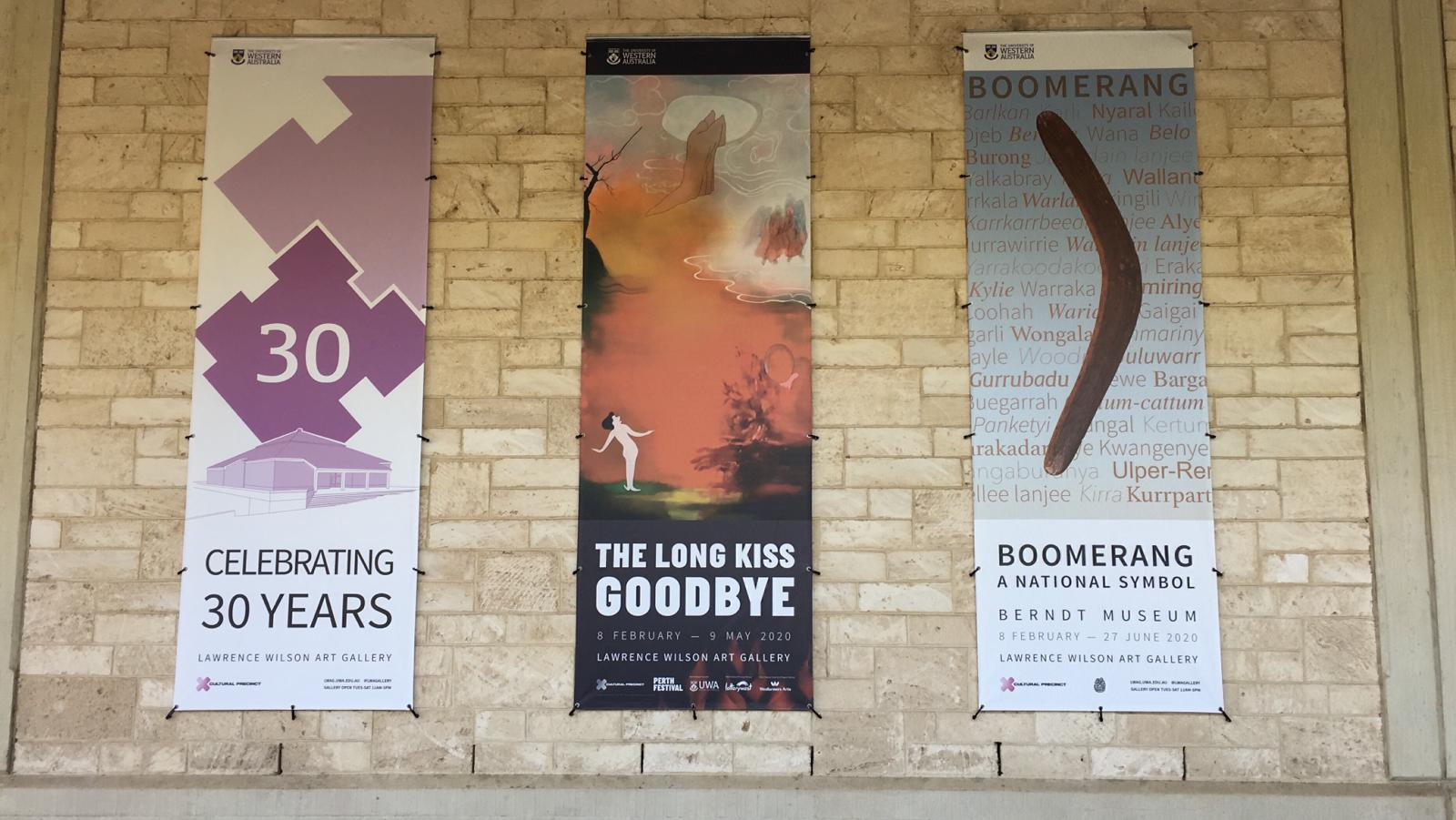
Banners for exhibitions in February 2020

== See also ==
- Art Gallery of Western Australia
