= Marguerite Mahood =

Australian artist, historian (1901–1989)

- Born: Margerite Henriette Callaway; 1901; Richmond, Victoria, Australia
- Died: 1989; Toorak, Victoria, Australia
- Education: National Gallery School; University of Melbourne
- Alma mater: University of Melbourne
- Known for: Pottery, ceramics, political caricatures
- Spouse: Thomas Orrock George Mahood (m. 1923)

Marguerite Henriette Mahood (née Callaway, 1901-1989) was an Australian graphic artist, ceramicist, sculptor, author and historian. She was a prolific writer, and produced a number of articles and texts for the Australian Home Beautiful journal. Mahood was a founder of many Australian artistic societies.

== Early life and education ==
Marguerite Henriette Callaway was born on 29 July 1901 in Richmond, Victoria. She was the eldest of four siblings of Henry George Callaway and Marguerite Gabrielle Callaway (née Deschamps). Mahood was raised at Yalcowinna, a mansion property built by William Highett on one and a half acres of gardens on Richmond Hill, Erin Street, Richmond. ‘Yalcowinna’ was eventually incorporated into the Bethesda and Epworth Hospitals in Erin Street.

After schooling at Presbyterian Ladies’ College in East Melbourne, Mahood attended the National Gallery School (now VCA) to study drawing under Frederick McCubbin and William Beckwith McInnes.

In the 1930s, Mahood attended classes in applied arts at the Working Men's College (the predecessor to RMIT), and studied independently with Leslie Wilkie.

On 16 June 1923 at the Independent Church, Collins Street, she married with Congregational forms Thomas Orrock George Mahood, an engineer.

== Career ==
After establishing herself as a graphic artist and watercolourist in the 1920s, Mahood first exhibited with the Victorian Artists' Society in 1925 with a series of linocut prints.

In 1926 Mahood became one of the first women in Australia to broadcast her own radio program, presenting a popular weekly discussion of art and architecture on the forerunner to the ABC between 1926 and 1929. In 1929 she persuaded radio station 3LO to have her host a show on interior decoration. In the early days of radio, she lectured on design and wrote articles for the Listerner-in and its Sydney counterpart Radio. She was able to continue her radio interests until the early 1930s.

Mahood cultivated an ability to make intricate pottery. Beginning with a wheel and kiln built by her husband, she undertook all aspects of production, from sieving and wedging the clay to the arduous task of stoking the kiln in her backyard studio. She advocated a high degree of technical control and her view was that "anyone could make 'jugs and mugs' and factories can generally make them better", so that she had to make pottery pieces that couldn't be made satisfactorily through industrial reproduction. Mahood's ceramic practice was known for its decorative and vibrating glazing, with intricate filigree patterning and a wide range of glazes. She often produced humorous pieces which brought her commercial success and public profile. Mahood's approach to her ceramic practice was to overcome production-line style pieces, and she made many 'double-filigree' items, which few have been able to copy.

Inspired by Asian and Islamic ceramics, European commercial potteries such as Sèvres, Meissen and Wedgwood, and English art pottery of the late 19th century, Mahood was also drawn to Neo-Gothic motifs: playful dragons appeared repeatedly in her work. A Herald reviewer described her in 1935 as 'unique among Victorian pottery workers in her colour range. . . a mistress of the dark rites of firing and glazing'. Meticulously numbered and often bearing her distinctive monogram, her work was easily identifiable. Detailed 'kiln books' ensured she avoided repeating mistakes and was able to continually refine her technique.

Her 1932 exhibition at Everyman's Library was so successful the prestigious Sedon Galleries asked her to hold future exhibitions with them. From 1932 until the 1950s Mahood’s regular exhibitions received positive reviews. She was included in William Moore’s The Story of Australian Art (1934), the first national survey of the field.

A founding member of the Australian Ceramic Society and the Victorian Sculptors’ Society, Mahood also wrote articles in Australian Home Beautiful that advised amateur potters—women in particular—on the ceramic process. Other articles dealt with the history of pottery and the Australian ceramics industry, which she vigorously promoted.

Mahood’s ceramic work eased after the birth of her son, Martin, in 1938. The increasing popularity of stoneware, changing taste in art and interior decoration, and her age influenced Mahood’s decision to cease her ceramic practice. Mahood continued her annual exhibitions until the mid-1940s and sporadically until the 1950s, having made thousands of pieces during that time, all of which were individual. Her last ceramics were produced for the Melbourne Olympic Games Arts Festival in 1956. She continued to produce artworks throughout her life, including a range of sculpted metal works and in her later years focused on sinuous linoprints of animals.

== Later career and life ==
During the 1940s and 1950s, Mahood ran a screenprinting business. As Margot Mahood, she became a popular children’s cartoonist, writing and illustrating The Whispering Stone: An Australian Nature Fantasy (1944), and Drawing Australian Animals (1952).

In the 1950s, with her son growing up, she also decided to write some children's books and drew children's cartoons for newspapers. For many years she was a contributor to Wild Life magazine and her series on 'How to Draw Australian Animals' resulted from this work. The Audubon Society of Canada, which publishes Conservation and Nature activities and articles, wrote to her and she produced a similar series on how to draw Canadian animals. A number of her children's books were published.

Always one for dramatic career changes, Mahood returned to academics earning a Master of Arts in 1965 and PhD in history in 1970 from the University of Melbourne. Her doctoral thesis was published in 1973 by the University of Melbourne Press, titled The Loaded Line: Australian Political Caricature 1788 – 1901. Mahood believed that the newspaper cartoon reflected the 'man in the street's' view of history and developed this argument, notwithstanding advice that it would not produce a satisfactory thesis. 'The Loaded Line' is now regarded as a seminal study of Australian cartoons and the definitive reference on Australian Political Cartoons up to Federation. Mahood ultimately became an acknowledged expert on the early Australian cartoonists and lithographers. Described in 1970 as a 'youthful, comfortably built woman' with grey, curly hair and hazel eyes, she continued to work in this field well into her eighties.

Mahood's archive is held at the Women's Art Register in Melbourne. While the Sydney Technological (Powerhouse) Museum was the only institution to acquire her ceramics during her lifetime, her work is now held in regional, state, national, and international collections.

== Death ==
Marguerite Mahood died on 14 October 1989 in Toorak, Melbourne; survived by her son and two grandsons.

== Exhibitions ==
- November 1932: Solo exhibition at Everyman's Library
- November 1933: Solo exhibition at Everyman's Library
- 19–30 November 1933: Solo exhibition at Sedon Galleries
- 23 November - 5 December 1936: Exhibition at Hogan Gallery
- March 1947: Solo exhibition at David Jones' Gallery
- 17–23 October 1997: From the Earth I Arise: The Ceramics of Marguerite Mahood, Ballarat Fine Art Gallery
