= Amalie Sara Colquhoun =

Australian artist

- Amalie Colquhoun in 1945
- Born: Amalie Sara Field; 20 March 1894; Murtoa, Victoria
- Died: 16 June 1974 (aged 80); East Melbourne, Victoria
- Known for: Painting, Educator
- Spouse: Archibald Colquhoun (m. 1931)

Amalie Sara Colquhoun (20 March 1894 – 16 June 1974) was an Australian landscape and portrait painter who is represented in national and state galleries. In addition to painting landscapes, portraits and still lifes, Colquhoun designed and supervised the construction of stained glass windows for three of Ballarat's churches, St Andrew's Kirk, Lydiard Street Uniting Church and Mount Pleasant Methodist Church. She studied in both Melbourne and Sydney, exhibited in England and Australia and taught in the school she started with her husband in Melbourne.

== Biography ==
She was born Amalie Sara Field in Murtoa, a town in the Wimmera region of Victoria, Australia to parents Alfred Francis Field, a blacksmith, and Louisa Caroline, née Degenhardt, both Australian born. They moved to Ballarat in 1904 where Amalie studied drawing and design at the Ballarat Technical Art School, becoming the Art Mistress there in the mid-1920s. She was described by Harold Herbert as one of the most brilliant students to ever pass through the school. She continued to advance her career when the Victorian Education Department supported her study of pottery and stained glass at Sydney Technical College. On returning to Ballarat she started the teaching of pottery at the school. She continued her studies at the well-known Max Meldrum School in Melbourne. She also taught at Melbourne Technical College.

Amalie Field married Archibald Colquhoun—also an artist—in 1931 and they had no children. She died on 16 June 1974 in East Melbourne and was buried in Boroondara cemetery, Kew, with Anglican rites.

== Career ==
In 1927, she was appointed to the Working Men's College in Melbourne, a post which she resigned in 1933. In the same year Archibald Colquhoun started an art school in that city. Amalie Colquhoun was one of Archibald Colquhoun's students and married him in 1931. Up until the time they bought their property at Swinton in Kew, the Colquhouns lived in their Melbourne studios.

Colquhoun and her husband taught for many years and had portraits, landscape paintings, and reproductions of famous sculptures displayed on the walls of the school. Colquhoun was noted for her seascapes painted from their holiday house at Lorne, Victoria. In 1937 they spent a year painting in Edinburgh and London, and exhibited jointly at the Islington Galleries, London. While there they also exhibited with the London Portrait Society. Her husband's 1948 painting of her, Amalie Colquhoun, is in the Art Gallery of New South Wales. The husband and wife frequently exhibited their work together, and were referred to as the two A's. Amalie has been commended for her ability to keep children happy while painting their pictures. She uses a puppet show controlled by her foot, with theatre built by Archie and figures made herself.

In 1950, the Colquhouns closed the school, and in 1954 moved from the city to Kew, establishing a studio and occasional gallery in their home. They continued to paint intensively, particularly landscapes and seascapes reflecting their travels.

I am convinced that everyone must benefit from the study of art. All adults should take some course, even if they do not start until they are 40. Many people may never be artists or make their living by art, but their artistic appreciation can be developed and improved just as a taste for good literature comes with good reading. They get a mental and artistic development that can never achieve in any other way. Often those who seem to fumble at the beginning go much further than those who start with a flash of brilliance that peters out into the ordinary. There are many people teaching art today who should be learning. Every teacher, in fact, should be a student, or the habit of experiment will be lost. It is only by experiment that art can keep on developing. -Amalie Colquhoun on why everyone should study art, The Herald, 20 December 1933

== Honours ==
Colquhoun was hung in Australia's premier portrait award the Archibald Prize multiple times over decades:

- In 1933 John Davie, Esq
- In 1934 Miss Jean Lawrence and Captain WA Robertson.
- In 1937 Mrs B Degenhart
- In 1939 Ellen
- In 1940 Russell Hooper and Graeme Penington
- In 1941 Miss Jenny Gowans and Miss KH Pearce
- In 1945 Mrs E Phillips Fox and Portrait of Miss R Heathcote
- In 1947 Miss Jean Whitman
- In 1948 Flight Lieut James Bruce Birchfield, No 3 Squadron, RAAF and she was the sitter for a portrait by her husband A D Colquhoun Amalie S Colquhoun.
- In 1949 Rosie which was acquired by the Art Gallery of NSW in 1950.
- In 1950 Andrea Maneschi
- In 1952 Jennessee Blakie
- In 1955 Miss Dorothy Ross, MSc, BA
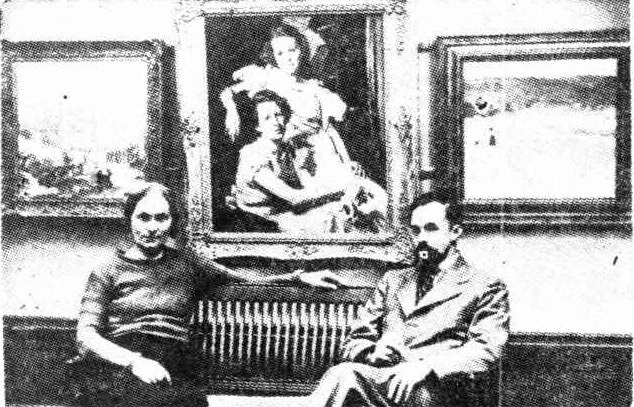
Amalie and Archibald Colquhoun exhibiting at the Islington Galleries, London

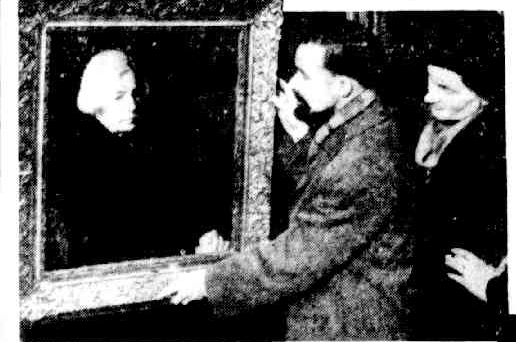
Artists Archibald and Amalie Colquhoun examining a painting at their exhibition

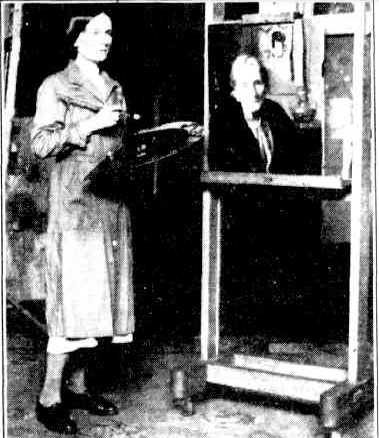
Amalie Colquhoun painting in her studio

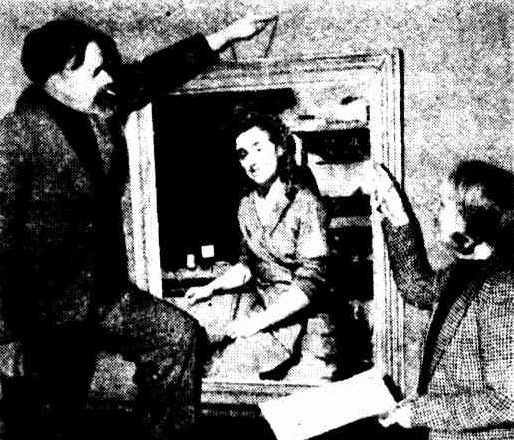
Amalie and Archibald Colquhoun hanging paintings for their joint exhibition

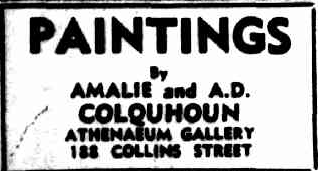
Advertisement for a joint exhibition by the Colquhouns

== Exhibitions ==
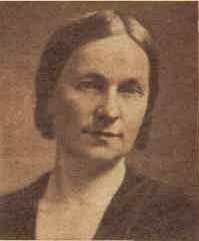
Amalie Colquhoun, Australian Women's Weekly

Paintings by Amalie Colquhoun and A. D. Colquhoun

- Athenaeum Gallery, 1934 (catalogue)
- Group exhibition, Athenaeum Gallery, 1934 (catalogue)
- Stair Gallery, 1937 (catalogue)
- Athenaeum Gallery, 1938 (catalogue)
- Seddon Galleries, 1942 (catalogue)

== Bibliography ==
- "Design and Art Australia Online." Amalie Sara Colquhoun: Biography at Design and Art Australia Online. DAAO, 1 Jan. 1995. Web. 27 Mar. 2017.

== See also ==
- Max Meldrum
