= Helen Ogilvie =

Australian artist (1902–1993)

William Pate (c.1930–39) Portrait drawing of Helen Ogilvie, in Anne Montgomery's studio in the Rialto Building, Collins Street. Collection of the State Library of Victoria

Helen Elizabeth Ogilvie (4 May 1902, in Corowa – 1 August 1993, in Melbourne) was a twentieth-century Australian artist and gallery director, illustrator, painter, printmaker and craftworker, best known for her early linocuts and woodcuts, and her later oil paintings of vernacular colonial buildings.

== Early life and education ==
Helen Elizabeth Ogilvie was born 4 May 1902 in Corowa and grew up in surrounding rural New South Wales where she would go sketching with her mother, Henrietta, a watercolourist, before her family moved to Melbourne in 1920. There Helen attended the National Gallery School in 1922–25 though she did not enjoy its conservative approach and prescriptive teaching methods. In her last year her style was influenced by George Bell while he briefly was the drawing master. While at the school she became a member of the Melbourne Society of Women Painters and Sculptors and started exhibiting in 1924.

== Early career ==
Inspired by seeing a book of Claude Flight's Modernist linocuts in 1928, Ogilvie produced many linocuts and woodcuts from the 1930s onwards. Her work in a 1932 group show is praised, with that of other exhibitors, for skills in cutting and "an intimate artistic facility for illustrative design". She was one of many women artists who took up relief printing but, unlike Eveline Syme and Ethel Spowers, Ogilvie could not afford to study it overseas, and when she took up wood engraving in the 1930s it was her friend, the artist and printmaker Eric Thake who provided instruction. She focussed on subject matter familiar to her, including farm animals, rural landscapes and Australian flora and fauna. Curator Sheridan Palmer in the catalogue for a 1995 Art Gallery of Ballarat retrospective described her as;

"a fiercely independent and resourceful woman, who was sophisticated in a simple way. She could turn her hand to many things, creating out of basic materials objects which suited her needs at the time."

She exhibited frequently, but in an effort to survive in the Depression years she also produced bookplates, greeting cards, and calendars. In 1933 she showed in a joint exhibition with printmaker Anne Montgomery.

She enjoyed good connections at Melbourne University and the National Gallery of Victoria, with art historians Joseph Burke, Ursula Hoff, and with Russell Grimwade, producing illustrations for the latter's book Flinders Lane: recollections of Alfred Felton (Melbourne University Press, Carlton, 1947) and Sir John Medley's Stolne and surreptitious verses (Melbourne University Press, Carlton, 1952). Buttons bearing her designs were sold for a shilling to raise funds for the 1955 building program at Melbourne University.

== War years ==
During WW2 and after, Ogilvie worked in the Red Cross Rehabilitation Service at Heidelberg Military Hospital under Frances Wade, where she taught patients lino- and wood-cutting, and basketmaking using locally harvested European and Australian native rushes. In 1948 Ogilvie, assisted by Helen Biggs, set up a school to train handicrafts instructors for Red Cross occupational therapy services.

== Gallerist ==
Ogilvie was a generous mentor of emerging artists, and in 1949 Stanley Coe appointed her as one of Australia's first women gallery directors to create a commercial exhibition space on the upper floor of his interior design shop at 435 Bourke Street, Melbourne. Artist Tate Adams dubbed it "the lone beacon in town for contemporary art." For the period until 1955, and with advice from her friends Ursula Hoff, Arnold Shore and Alan McCulloch, she organised a program of exhibitions of the avant-garde; John Brack, Margo Lewers, Leonard French (who showed his Illiad series, amongst his earliest experiments with enamel house paint on Masonite, October 1952), Inge King, Arthur Boyd, Charles Blackman (whose radical 'schoolgirl' series was shown there in May 1953), Ludwig Hirschfeld Mack (whose first Australian show in a commercial gallery was there in 1953), Helen Maudsley, Clifton Pugh, Michael Shannon and others.

The opening show in February 1950 of a group twenty Victorian artists associated with George Bell, whose work was also shown, included Alan Warren, Alan Sumner, Constance Stokes, Roger Kemp, William Frater, Charles Bush, Daryl Lindsay, Phyl Waterhouse, Ada May Plante, Francis Roy Thompson, and Arnold Shore, and was followed by a survey show of contemporary art from Sydney. The National Gallery of Victoria purchased important contemporary works from Stanley Coe Gallery between 1950 and 1963. In 1954 however, the dominance of the gallery for emerging artists was being challenged, a fact signalled by the Contemporary Art Society's massive exhibition at Tye's Gallery at 100 Burke Street in 1954 and the ascendancy of their Gallery of Contemporary Art on Flinders Street.

During her period as gallery director, work by Ogilvie was among others selected in 1950 to decorate the liner Oronsay, and in 1954 her work was show together with that of Tate Adams and Kenneth Hood at the Victoria and Albert Museum, London, encouraging her change of attention to Europe and back to her own art-making.

== London ==
After moving on from her directorship, Ogilvie's own oil paintings of abandoned country structures were shown in 1956 at the gallery, which had been renamed the Peter Bray. She had firmly established her reputation in Australia, with works already acquired by Hoff for the collection of the National Gallery of Victoria, and had purchased a house in South Yarra. That year she moved to London, where she was engaged with the Crafts Revival of the 1950s and 60s and because, as she joked in an interview, "art doesn't pay", she made a living designing modernist lampshades of Japanese papers and parchment for a period, selling them to the high society customers of interior designer David Hicks, of Knightsbridge and Oxfordshire.

During her stay overseas, she visited and sketched the English countryside, and with Melbourne friend Hattie Alexander, described as her 'companion', toured Italy over 11 weeks. Though she produced sketches of European sites, she did not exhibit them but continued to paint small studies of Australian rural buildings, from memory and from sketches, holding two successful solo exhibitions of them in London, including one of 34 canvases, which sold out.

== Return to Australia and late career ==
Ogilvie returned to Australia in 1963 where the subjects of her paintings and drawings continued to be humble rural buildings which she was aware were disappearing; in an interview she bemoaned the lack of protection given such relics in Australia, compared to the UK. While many Australian artists continued to follow European and international trends, Ogilvie devoted her art to Australian subjects, determined to create a new tradition of Australian printmaking and artistic practice. Reception of her paintings in Australia however, as opposed to her earlier prints, was lukewarm; Donald Brook in reviewing her 1968 Macquarie Galleries solo describes them as 'sweet and stiff'. By the late 1970s she was producing little work but remained interested in the art world. The last of her solo exhibitions that she was able to attend opened at aGOG (Australian Girls' Own Gallery), Canberra, on her 89th birthday, 4 May 1991.

Ogilvie died suddenly in Melbourne on 1 August 1993.

== Legacy ==
Critical response to Ogilvie's work was sparse, limited mainly to the prints and to vague praise or her 'fine impressions in line and colour' or of lino-cutting skills, 'the work of a sound craftsman [sic]', 'decorative' and with a sense of colour that is 'agreeable and harmonious'. By the time of curator Sheridan Palmer's touring Ballarat Art Gallery Ogilvie 1995 retrospective, The Age critic Robert Nelson in his review highlighted;

"the artist's deficiencies in painting which were already noted in her years at the Gallery School in Melbourne. Ogilvie's floral works in linocut show decorative flair, but this late flowering of the ornament of the '20s won't win Ogilvie a place among the mighty."

Nevertheless, her work, especially her printmaking, has since enjoyed a renewed interest and reevaluation, and has featured in seven major surveys of Australian women's art (see section 'Posthumous exhibitions', below).

== Exhibitions ==
=== Solo ===
- 1948, May: Exhibition of watercolour drawings
- 1956, April: Paintings, Peter Bray Gallery, Melbourne
- 1963, February/March: Australian Country Dwellings, shown with The Landscapes of Lucien Pissarro at Leicester Galleries Gallery, Audley Sq., Mayfair, London
- 1967, March: Leicester Galleries, Audley Sq., Mayfair, London
- 1967, October: Helen Ogilvie Paintings, Leveson Street Gallery, North Melbourne
- 1968, September: joint solo with David Rose, Macquarie Galleries, Sydney
- 1970, 15–26 October: "Australian Country Buildings" Leveson Street Gallery
- 1972, from 3 May: Macquarie Galleries (joint solo with Nancy Borlase)
- 1974, 2–13 June: Leveson Street Gallery, Melbourne.
- 1979, 11–30 July: solo alongside Trevor Weekes and Denese Oates, Macquarie Galleries
- 1982, 1 October – 31 October: Project 39: Women's imprint, part of Women and the Arts Festival, Art Gallery of New South Wales, Sydney, New South Wales
- 1991, May 1991: Australian Girls Own Gallery, Canberra, ACT

=== Group ===
- 1924, 18–27 November: An Exhibition Of Etchings & Drawings, with Hans Heysen, John D. Moor, Lionel Lindsay, John Goodchild, John L. Berry, Frank H. Molony, R. J. Waterhouse, Fred. C. Britten, Lloyd Rees, d’A. Boxall, J. Barclay Godson, Arthur Reed, H. Van Raake, B. E. Minns, Harold D. Herbert, James S. MacDonald, Norman Carter, Thea Proctor, Alfred T. Clint, Margaret Preston, A. Henry Fullwood, Raymond H. McGrath, Don Finley, Hamilton Mack, Adrian Feint, F. M. Grey, Montague White, Audrey Hardy, K. Sauerbier, Professor Leslie Wilkinson, Hardy Wilson, Daryl Lindsay, Sydney Ure Smith. Exhibition Hall, Sixth Floor, Farmer & Company, department store, cnr. Pitt, Market & George Streets, Sydney
- 1932, 5–16 April: with Sybil Andrews, Cyril Power, Ethel Spowers, Eveline Syme, Eric Thake, John Dick, Christian Waller, Dorrit Block, Ron Meadows, Marjorie Wood, Michael O’Connell. Everyman's Library, 332 Collins Street
- 1932, to 29 October: Helen Ogilvie, Peggie Crombie, Helen Boyd, paintings and prints. Collins House, Melbourne.
- 1933: New Melbourne Art Club exhibition, Sedon Galleries, Melbourne
- 1933, 16–23 October: The Arts and Crafts Society Annual Exhibition, Melbourne Town Hall
- 1934, The centenary art exhibition, Commonwealth Bank Chambers, 367 Collins Street, Melbourne.
- 1936: Painter-Etchers and Graphic Art Society of Australia, David Jones Art Gallery
- 1936, 14–25 July: New Melbourne Art Club exhibition, Athenaeum Gallery
- 1936, 15 April-1 May: Exhibition of paintings, Stair Gallery, 117 Collins Street, Melbourne
- 1937, from 12 July: New Melbourne Art Club exhibition, Athenaeum Gallery
- 1939, 21 August – 2 September: New Melbourne Art Club Seventh Annual Show
- 1949, February 22-March 4: Exhibition of pictures by Australian artists and loan collection of Indian art, in aid of University Women's College Building Appeal,. Tye's Gallery, 100 Bourke Street, Melbourne
- 1949, 5 – 13 November: Fern Tree Gully Arts Society, Sixth annual exhibition.
- 1953, October: Flowerdale CWA annual exhibition
- 1954, November: Helen Ogilvie, Tate Adams, Kenneth Hood, Victoria and Albert Museum, London
- 1954: with Braund, Blackman, Brack, Shannon, Nine Victorian Artists, Peter Bay Gallery.
- 1956, June: with Dorothy Braund, Barbara Brash, Guelda Pyke, Roma Thomson, Phyl Waterhouse, and six male artists, Paintings for Seven Guineas, Peter Bray Gallery
- 1958: Crouch Prize exhibition, Art Gallery of Ballarat
- 1964, August: with Lady Williams (President) Geoff Jones, Guelda Pyke, Edith Wall, Bill Coleman, Dorothy Braund, Guelda Gude, Madge Freeman-Davis, and others of the Melbourne Contemporary Artists, Argus Gallery
- 1965, 28 February-11 March: Leveson Street Art Gallery, corner of Leveson and Victoria Streets, North Melbourne
- 1967, 26 February-9 March: Leveson Street Art Gallery, corner of Leveson and Victoria Streets, North Melbourne
- 1973, March: Leveson Street Art Gallery, corner of Leveson and Victoria Streets, North Melbourne
- 1974, March 3–21: Leveson Street Art Gallery, corner of Leveson and Victoria Streets, North Melbourne
- 1974, 26 September: Association for the Blind – Springfield Art Show
- 1975, 7 November-23 November: Deutsher Galleries opening exhibition – a collection of 19th & 20th century European & Australian paintings, drawings & graphics
- 1977, April 2: Exhibition marking the opening of 'Important Women Artists Gallery', 13 Emo Road, Malvern East, Victoria
- 1978, 1 April-7 May: Cicadas and gumnuts – The Society of Arts and Crafts 1906–1935, Art Gallery of New South Wales
- 1979, 16 February-4 March: inaugural exhibition Murray Crescent Galleries, 35 Murray Crescent, Manuka, Australian Capital Territory
- 1980, 21–23 November: Ogilvie works included amongst 600 items purchased for the National Gallery of Victoria by the Gallery Society from 1949–1980 which were offered for sale at an Art Mart, Caulfield Arts Centre.
- 1981/2, Nov. 1981 – Jan. 1982: with Christopher Croft, Janet Dawson, Ruth Faerber, Dusan Marek, Clifton Pugh, Lloyd Rees, Udo Sellbach, Michael Shannon, Guy Warren. Tasmania visited, Tasmanian Museum and Art Gallery.
- 1982, 27 November-5 December: Artbank purchase exhibition held in conjunction with the Victorian Artists' Society
- 1990, 9–24 December: Christmas exhibition, Jester Press Gallery, 178 Bridport Street, Albert Park

=== Posthumous ===
==== Solo ====
- 1995: All this I knew, Ballarat Fine Art Gallery, Ballarat, VIC. and travelling
- 1995/6, 15 December – 14 January: Helen Ogilvie Retrospective, McClelland Art Gallery, Langwarrin

==== Inclusions in ====
- 1995, 5 March – 30 April: Australian Women Printmakers 1910–1940, Castlemaine Art Museum, Castlemaine, VIC
- 1995, 8 March – 2 April: The Women's View: Australian women artists in the Bendigo Art Gallery, 1888–1995, Bendigo Art Gallery, Bendigo, Vic
- 1995, 8 March – 8 June: National Women's Art Exhibition, with Speaking of Women, four guest lectures; by Nancy Underhill, Ann Thomson, Margo Neale, Joan Kerr; held over successive Fridays, 10–31 March 1995, by the Art Gallery Society, Art Gallery of New South Wales, Sydney, NSW
- 1995, 4 August – 5 August: Women and Art auction preview for Dalia Stanley Auctioneers, auction held 6 August 1995, Mary Place Gallery, Paddington, NSW
- 2000/1, 24 November 2000 – 25 February 2001: Modern Australian Women: paintings and prints 1925–1945, Art Gallery of South Australia, Adelaide, SA. Then national tour.
- 2002, June/July: Journeys, Tasmanian Museum and Art Gallery
- 2011/12 10 December 2011 to 4 February 2012: Australian works on paper, Josef Lebovic Gallery, Kensington
- 2011/12, 20 October 2011 – 15 December 2012: Look, Look Again , highlights from the Cruthers Collection of Women's Art (CCWA), gifted to the University of Western Australia in 2007, with publication titled Into the Light and symposium Are we there yet?. Lawrence Wilson Art Gallery, University of Western Australia, Perth, WA
- 2019, 18 May – 4 August: Becoming Modern : Australian women artists 1920–1950, Art Gallery of Ballarat

== Collections ==
- Art Gallery of Western Australia, Perth, WA
- Queen Victoria Museum and Art Gallery, Launceston, TAS
- Tasmanian Museum and Art Gallery, Hobart, TAS
- Castlemaine Art Museum, Castlemaine, VIC
- Benalla Art Gallery, Benalla, VIC
- City of Ballarat Fine Art Gallery, Ballarat, VIC
- University of Melbourne, Melbourne, VIC
- La Trobe Collection, State Library of Victoria, Melbourne, VIC
- National Gallery of Victoria, Melbourne, VIC
- National Gallery of Australia, Canberra, ACT
- Art Gallery of New South Wales, Sydney, NSW, Australia
- Queensland Art Gallery
- Ian Potter Museum of Art, the University of Melbourne, VIC
- Cruthers Collection of Women's Art at the University of Western Australia

== Publications illustrated by ==
- Grimwade, Russell; EBSCOhost (20 February 2018), Flinders Lane : recollections of Alfred Felton, Miegunyah Press, ISBN 978-0-522-87392-4
- Medley, J. D. G; Ogilvie, Helen (1952), Stolne and surreptitious verses, s. n
- Serle, Geoffrey; Medley, John, Sir, 1891–1962; Marginson, R. D. (Raymond David), 1923- (1993), Sir John Medley : a memoir, Melbourne University Press, ISBN 978-0-522-84540-2

== Publications about ==
- Maxwell, Helen (1995), Helen Ogilvie : Wood engravings, Brindabella Press, ISBN 978-0-909422-24-0
- Castlemaine Art Gallery and Historical Museum; McKay, Kirsten; Castlemaine Art Gallery & Historical Museum (1995), Women printmakers 1910 to 1940 in the Castlemaine Art Gallery and Historical Museum, The Gallery and Museum, ISBN 978-0-646-23161-7
- Ogilvie, Helen; Palmer, Sheridan; Ballarat Fine Art Gallery (1995), All this I knew : Helen Ogilvie retrospective exhibition, Ballarat Fine Art Gallery, ISBN 978-0-949063-07-6
- Into the light : the Cruthers Collection of Women's Art. Cruthers, John., Kinsella, Lee., Lawrence Wilson Art Gallery. Crawley, W.A.: UWA Publishing. 2012. ISBN 978-1-74258-485-0. OCLC 800667960.
- Ogilvie, Helen; aGOG Australian Girls Own Gallery (1991), Helen Ogilvie : aGOG 4 May to 23 May 1991, aGOG
- Munk, Frances (1996), "From banksias to slaughter houses: the art of Helen Ogilvie", Imprint, 31 (1): 25–26, ISSN 0313-3907
- Munk, Frances (1994), "The Prints of Helen Ogilvie", Postgraduate Diploma thesis, University of Melbourne.
