= Sybil Craig =

Australian painter and war artist

Sybil Mary Frances Craig OAM
- Born: 18 November 1901; London, United Kingdom
- Died: 9 September 1989 (aged 87); Melbourne, Victoria, Australia
- Known for: Painting

Sybil Mary Frances Craig OAM (1901–1989), was an Australian painter. She was appointed by the Australian War Memorial to accept the appointment as an official war artist. She was the first woman to paint women working in the munitions’ factories.

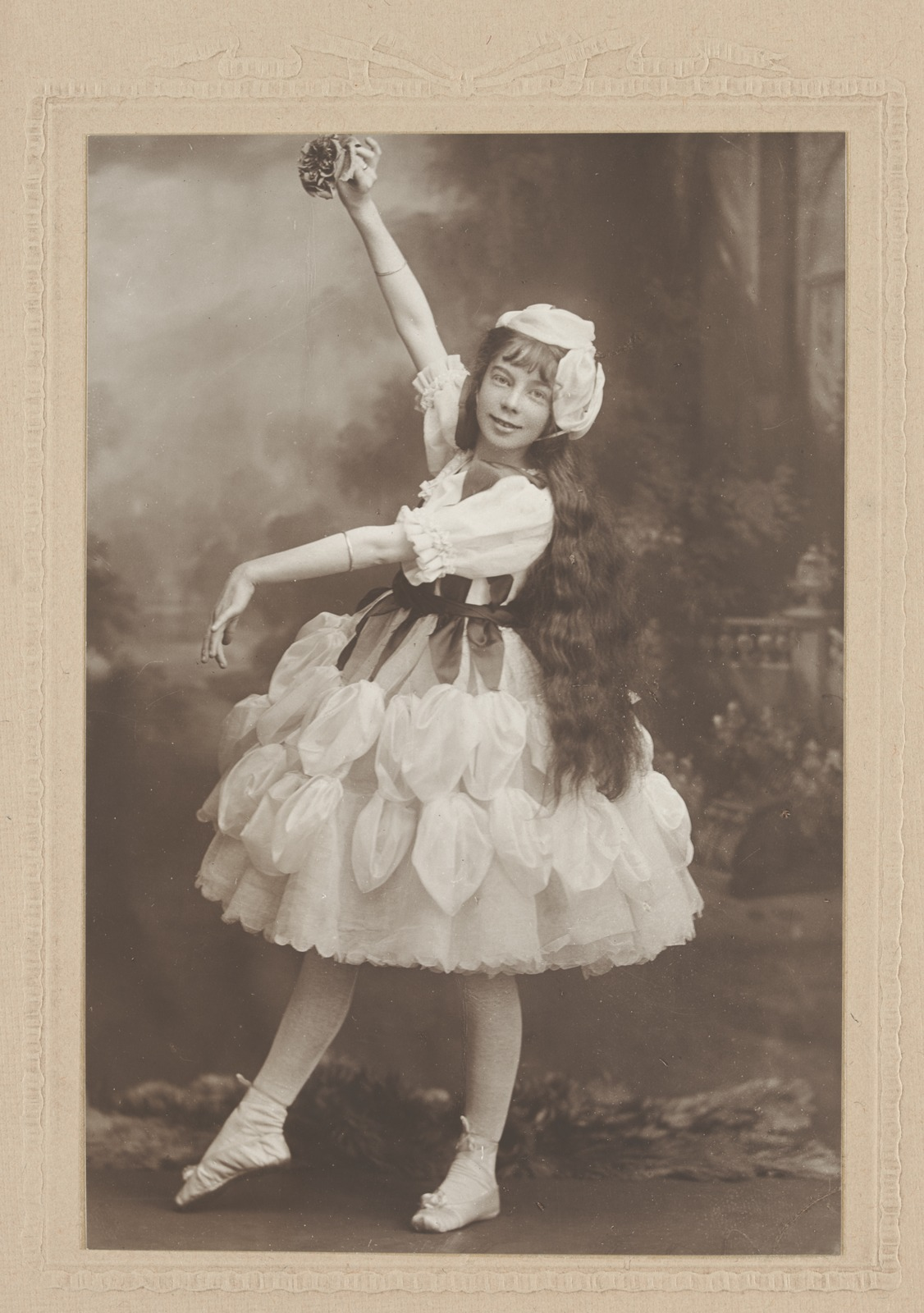
Sybil Craig in ballet costume

== Early life ==
Craig was born in London, England on 18 November 1901. She was the only child of affluent parents Matthew Frances Craig and Winifred Frances, née Major. Her family emigrated to Australia in 1902. The Craigs first lived in Brighton, but moved to Caulfield in 1914 into a house built by Matthew. Craig recalled a childhood spent in a 'suburban bohemian household' that was frequented by artists and musicians.

== Career ==
From 1924 though 1931 Craig studied at the National Gallery of Victoria Art School where she was taught by Bernard Hall, William McInnes and Charles Wheeler. She also studied at the Working Men's College, Melbourne (now RMIT) in 1935. In 1932 she had her first solo show at the Melbourne Athenaeum. She had a studio on Collins Street from 1936 to 1951 and had the financial means that left her free to pursue painting.

In March 1945 Craig became an official war artist, commissioned by the Australian War Memorial Board to record the contribution of women to the war effort. She recorded women working at the Commonwealth Explosives Factory at Maribyrnong, a suburb of Melbourne.

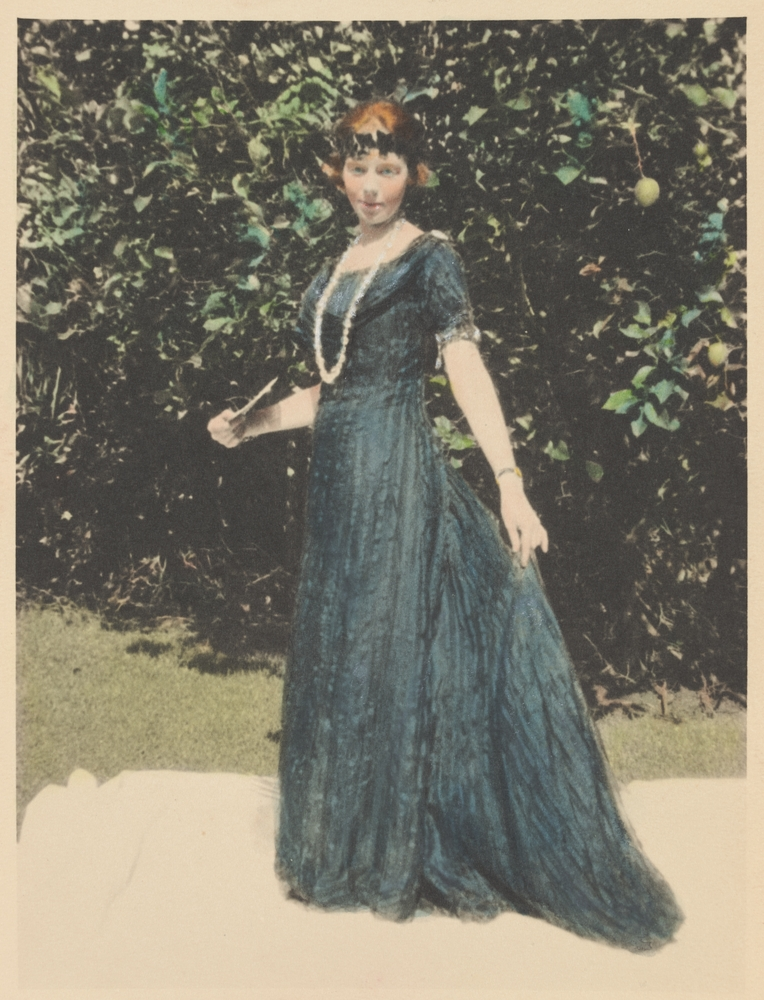
in the 1920s

Craig was a member of several artistic organizations including the New Melbourne Art Club, the Melbourne Society of Women Painters and Sculptors, the Victorian Artists Society, and the Twenty Melbourne Painters.

In 1978, the Important Woman Artists Gallery in East Malvern held a retrospective of her work.

She was awarded the Medal of the Order of Australia in the 1981 Queen's Birthday Honours. Craig died 15 September 1989 in Melbourne.
