= Leopoldine Mimovich =

Austro-Australian liturgical artist

- Born: June 25, 1920
- Died: December 25, 2019 (aged 99)
- Occupations: Liturgical artist; sculptor; etcher; brazier; carver; painter; illustrator; printmaker

Leopoldine Mimovich (née Deflorian) OAM, also known as "Poldi" (June 25, 1920 – December 25, 2019), was an Austro-Australian liturgical artist, sculptor, etcher, brazier, carver, painter, illustrator and printmaker.

In 1985, she received a Medal of the Order of Australia for her 'service to sculpture'.

== Early life and education ==
Mimovich was born in 1920, the second of five children in a devoutly Catholic family, and spent her childhood in Sankt Johann in the Pongau region of the First Republic of Austria (currently Neumarkt, Italy). Her parents recognised her artistic potential early, but could not afford to send her to art school, so she worked throughout her teens as an apprentice to her father Franz Deflorian, an interior decorator.

At age 16 she met her first husband, Othmar Vockner, a soldier. He was killed on the Russian front in 1941 in the early years of World War II, just three years after their marriage, when she was 21.

She studied sculpting at the Vienna School of Wood Sculpture and then later at the School of Wood Sculpture in Hallstatt from 1943 to 1947. Her studies were interrupted during the war and she made bombs in a munitions factory for a time, eventually graduating as a teacher in Hallstadt in 1947.

== Migration ==
In 1948, she married a Serbian prisoner of war Ljubisa (Leo/Lou) Mimovich, who was being held in a POW camp near her village around Salzburg. When they married, Mimovich lost her Austrian citizenship and had to emigrate. Initially the couple applied to migrate to America, where Mimovich's aunt was living. When their application was slow to process, they applied also to Australia which was approved first and they arrived in Port Melbourne, Victoria in July 1948 on the ship MV Skaugum.

At the Bonegilla Migrant Reception and Training Centre Mimovich was unable to practice her craft, becoming homesick and finding the place bleak & boring. When their luggage arrived a fortnight later, she bargained one of her two carved masks with an official at the training centre to transfer to the Royal Park Migrant Camp in Melbourne earlier than scheduled.

== Career ==
Once in Melbourne, they began two-year labour contracts, Leopoldine in a shirt factory and Lou at Hoffman's brickworks. Mimovich then moved to the Myer department store where she worked in the furniture carving department, and began accepting commissions for carvings. She experienced discrimination, noting that women's work was less respected and financially undervalued.

The couple purchased a house in the eastern suburbs of Melbourne where she set up her studio and undertook commissions reflecting her Austrian traditions and Catholic background. Over time her work evolved into a more impressionistic, free-flowing form and adopted local materials such as Huon pine. Her reputation as a sculptor grew rapidly, and she moved into bronze casting and copper etching.

Mimovich became a member of, and regularly exhibited her works with both the Melbourne Society of Women Painters and Sculptors and the Association of Sculptors of Victoria.

In the 1970s, Mimovich was commissioned to create a new set of Stations for Our Lady of Good Counsel Church in Deepdene, which she carved from Queensland Beech wood. Originally, the Stations were set in a frame, but after the church underwent a refurbishment in 2016, the Stations were removed from the frames and mounted against a copper background.

Over the decades she has received commissions for many religious and secular sculptures for churches, parks and public buildings in Australia, Germany, Honolulu, Japan, Korea, London, New Guinea, Timor-Leste, and the United States. Today her works are also held in a number of public and private collections across 5 continents, including the Australian Catholic University Art Collection, the Mawson Inter-Denominational chapel in Antarctica, and in the headquarters of the United Nations in New York.

As part of the 1985 Australia Day Honours she received a Medal of the Order of Australia (OAM) for her 'service to sculpture'.

In 1990, Mimovich donated ten secular themed sculptures to the Melbourne suburb of Kew. The figures have simplified forms, typical of mid-20th century modernism, and are now spread across the Alexandra Gardens in Kew.

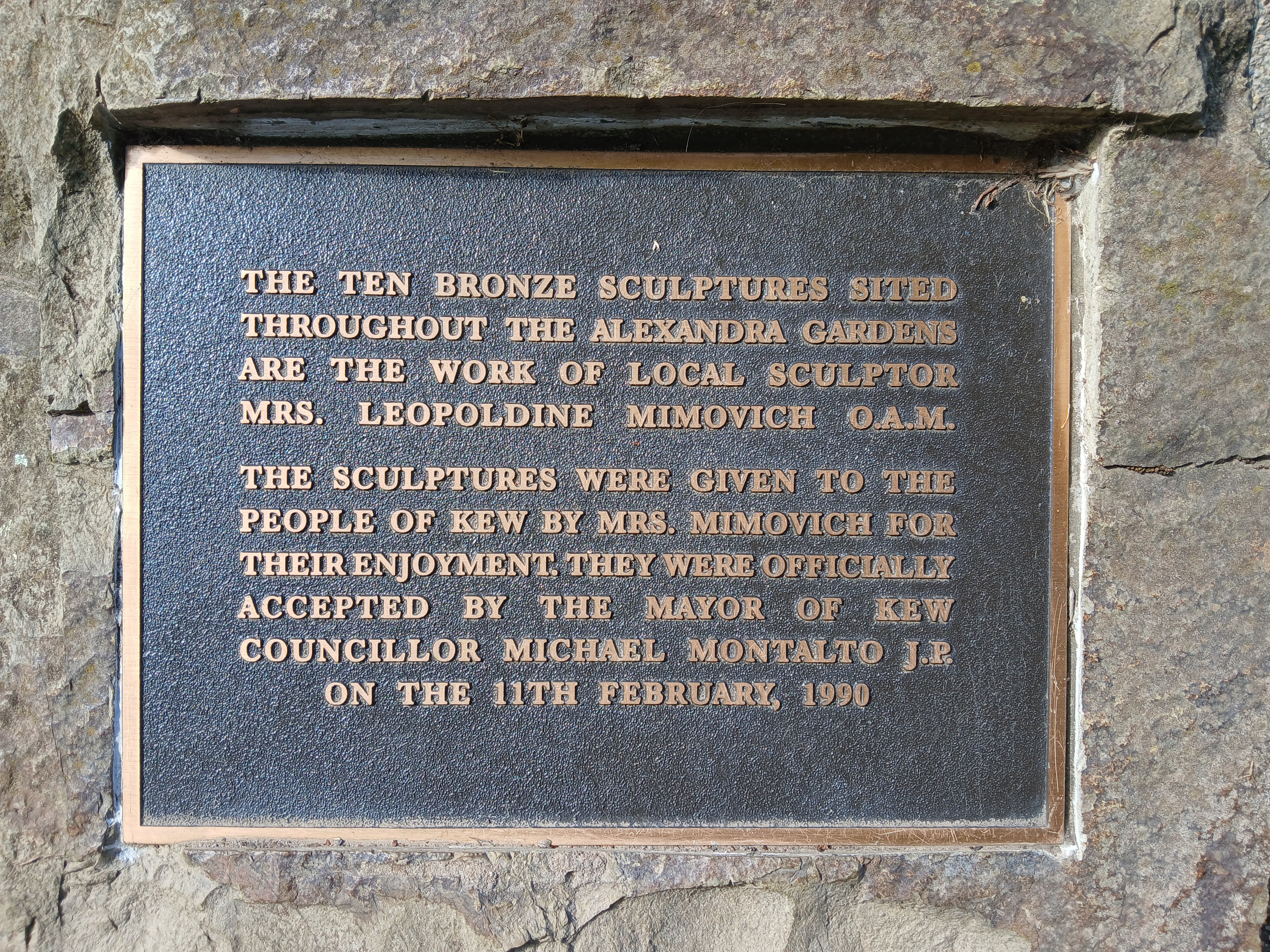
Plaque commemorating the donation of 10 bronze sculptures by Leopoldine Mimovich OAM to the 'people of Kew', at Alexandra Gardens in Kew

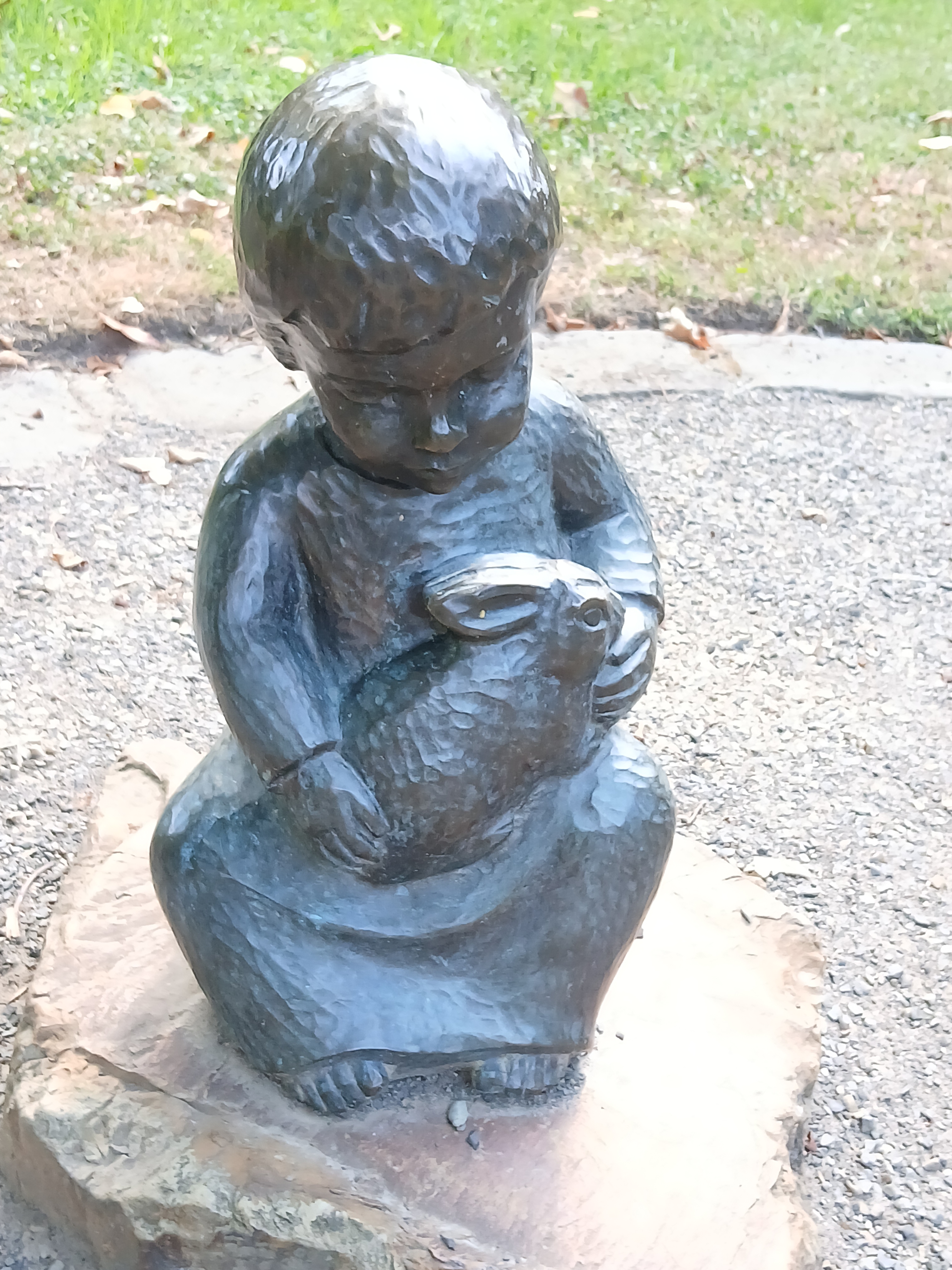
'Boy with Rabbit' created in 1990, at Alexandra Gardens in Kew.

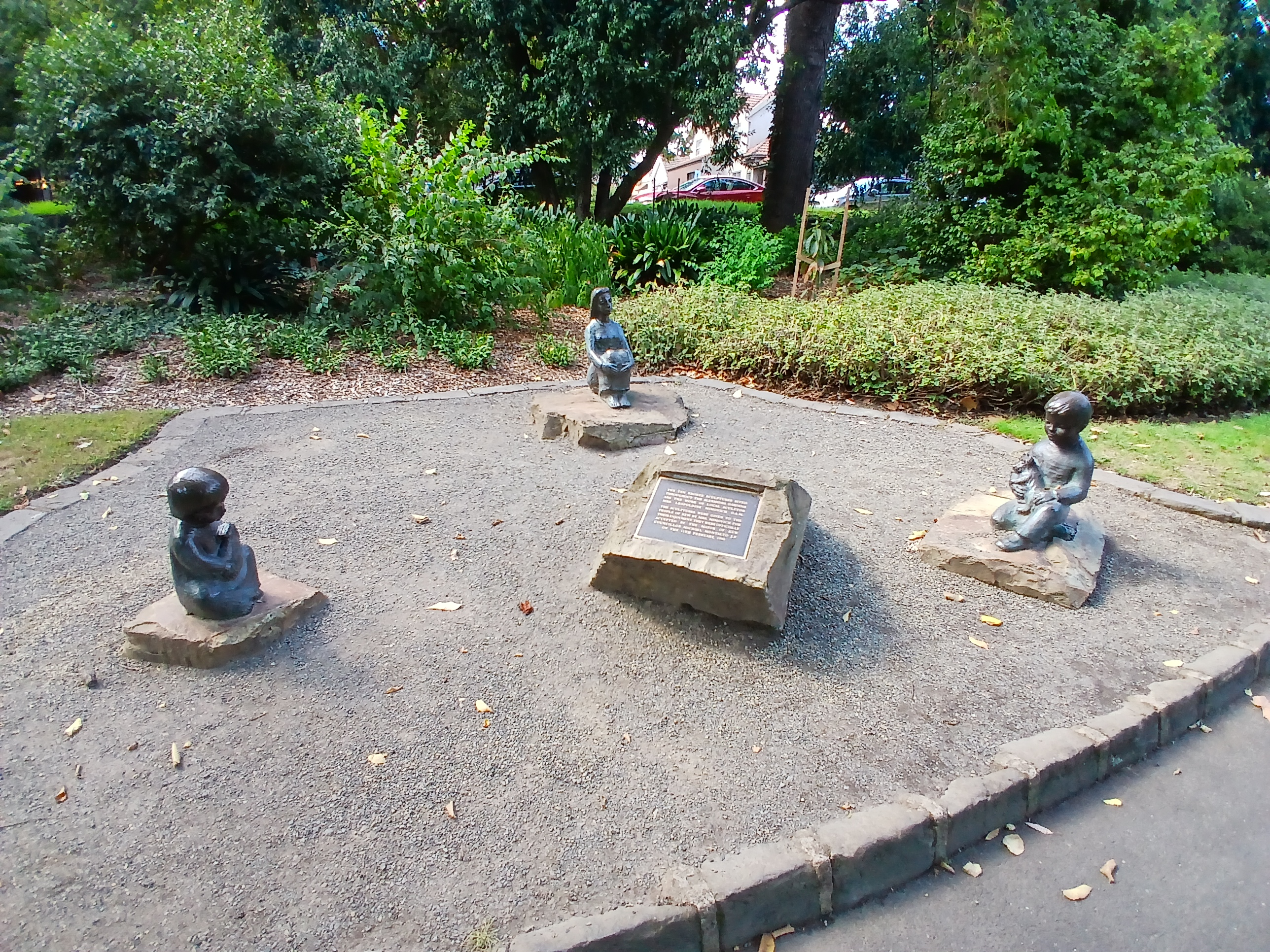
Three bronze sculptures by Leopoldine Mimovich at Alexandra Gardens in Kew

Mimovich also donated sculptures to the Kew Library adjacent to the Alexandra Gardens, both works in the series 'Seasons'.

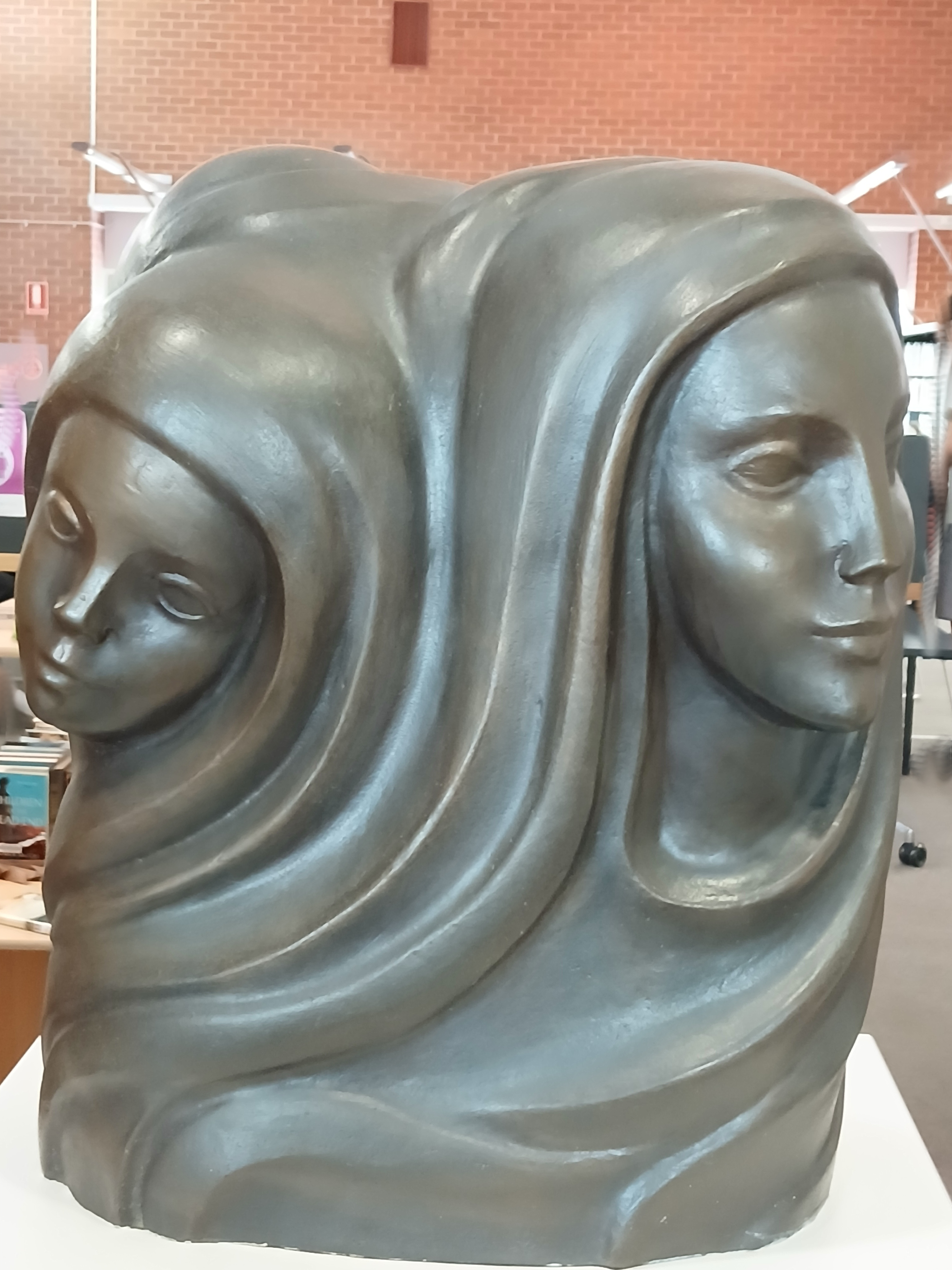
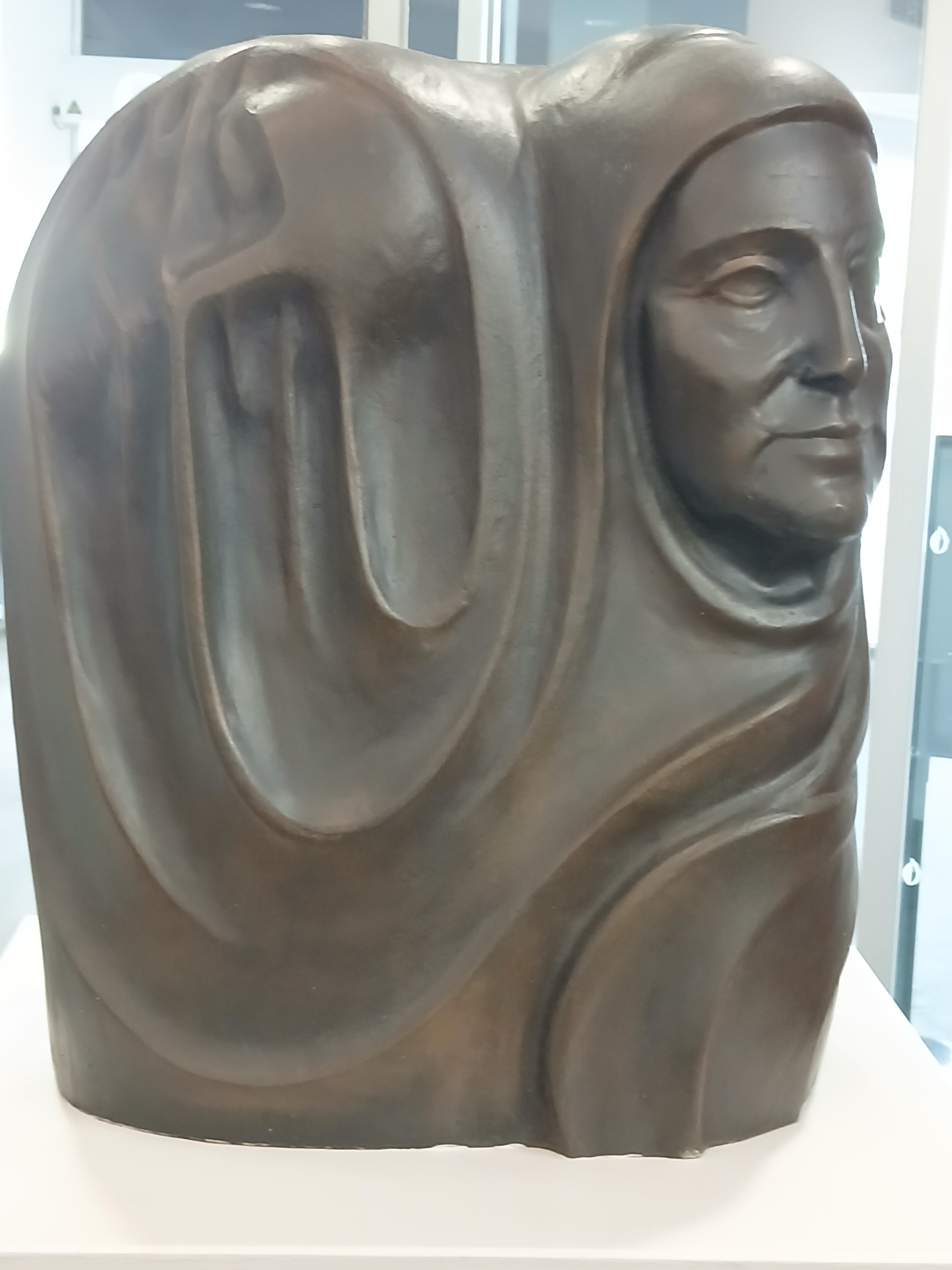
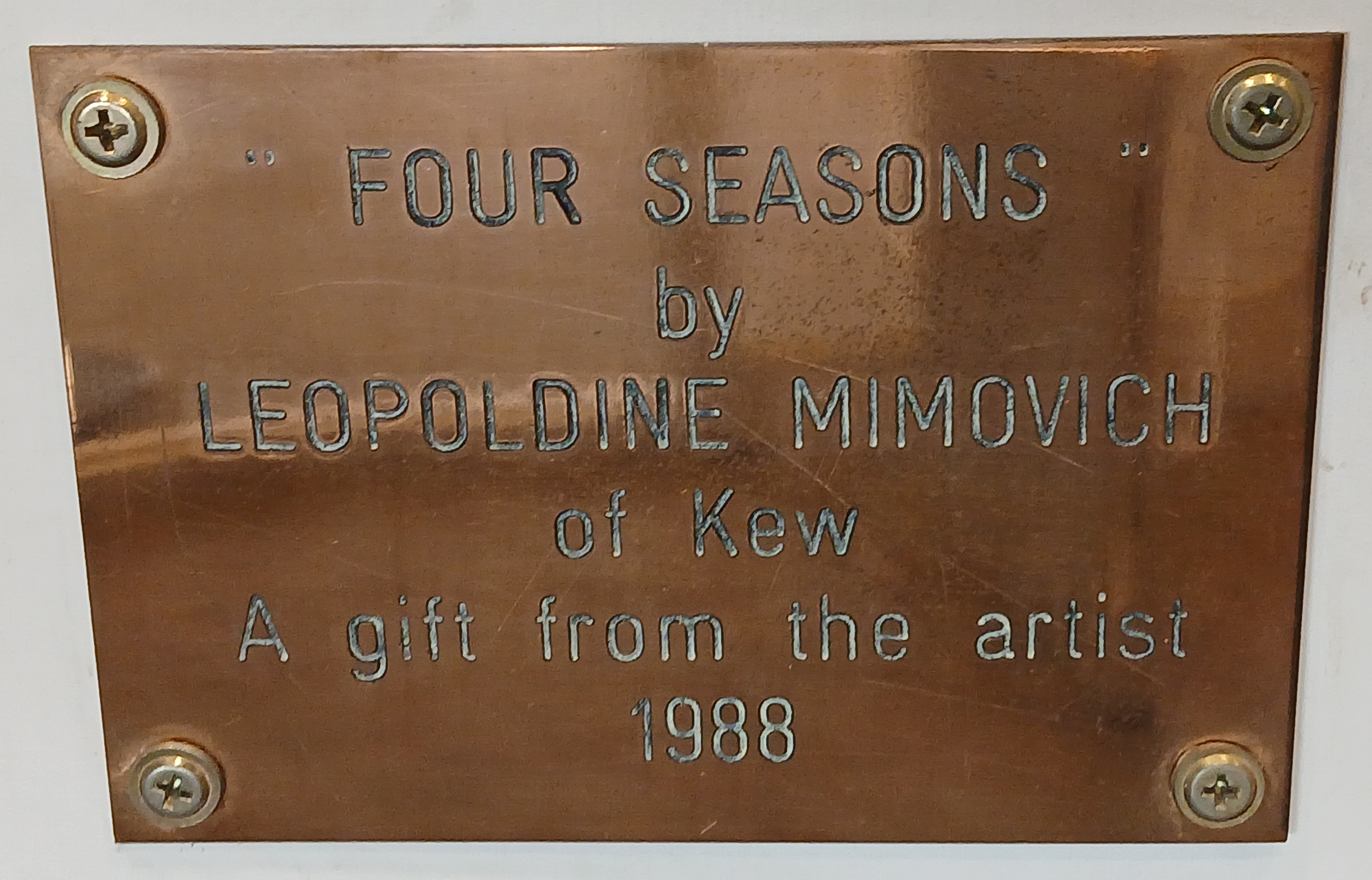
'Four Seasons' sculpture by Leopoldine Mimovich and the accompanying plate describing the donation to the Kew Library
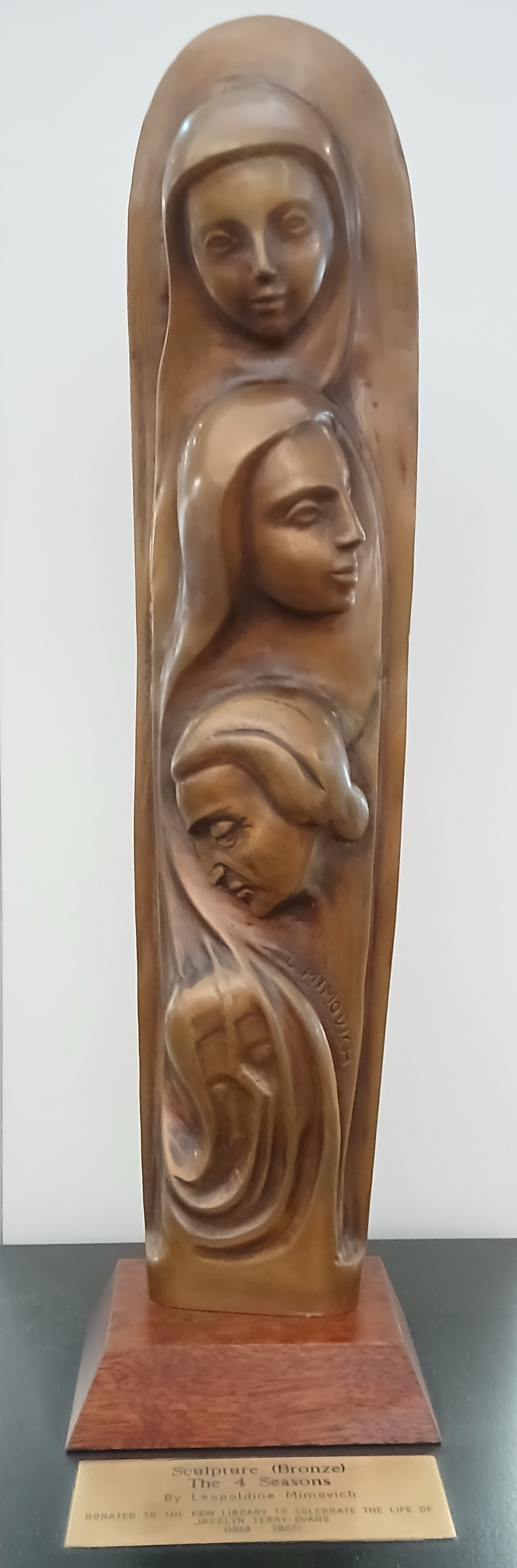
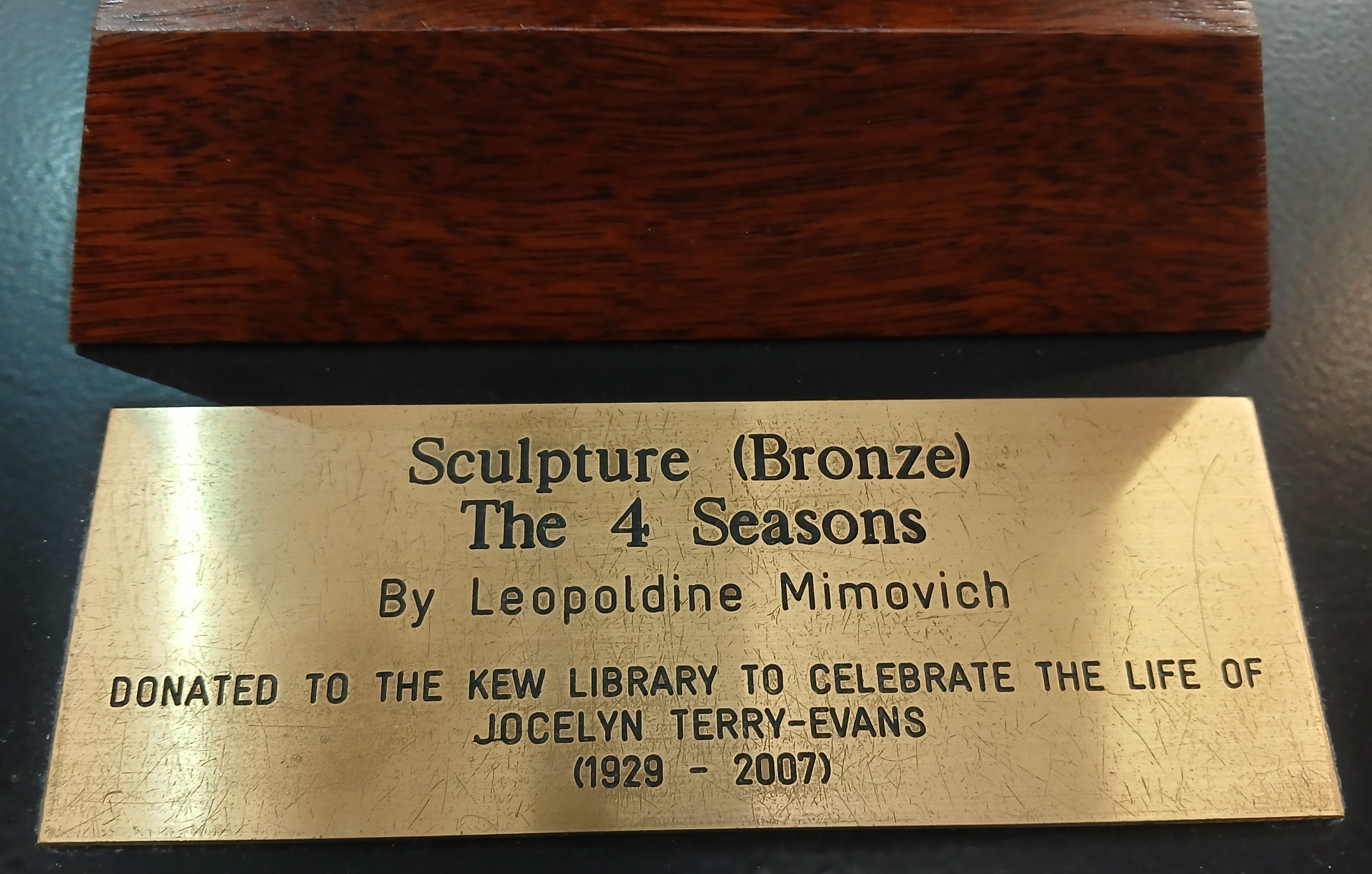
'The 4 Seasons' sculpture by Leopoldine Mimovich and the accompanying plate describing the donation to the Kew Library

== Later life ==
In the later years of her career Mimovich was hampered by a lung condition related to wood dust, and when she was no longer able to sculpt, she started painting icons.

In 2013, when Mimovich was at the age of 93, her house in Kew caught fire and she was rescued by three of her neighbours, who were each awarded a Commendation for Brave Conduct on 18 August 2014 for their roles in saving Mimovich. However many of her sculptures were smoke-damaged, and she was able to clean and restore only a few of the sculptures.

Mimovich died on Christmas Day 2019 at the age of 99.

== Legacy ==
In 1996, her experience as a post-war migrant coming to Australia was told in Season 2 Episode 11 of SBS's series: Tales from a Suitcase.

As part of their annual Christmas stamp series highlighting both traditional and secular themes, Australia Post featured two stamps with art by Mimovich for their 2020 Christmas season, with each stamp design incorporating native Australian flora and fauna. The works reproduced on the stamps were 'Mother Mary and the infant Jesus' painted c.1980, and the 'Untitled (Holy Family)' painted c.1970's. Both are held in the Australian Catholic University Art Collection.

== Bibliography ==
- Leopoldine Mimovich, Memories guide my hands: etchings, Spectrum Publications, 1985. OCLC 22001601 ISBN 978-0-86786-087-0, 0-86786-087-1. An autobiographical book of drawings tracing her life.
