= Working Men's College, Melbourne =

Working Men's College
- RMIT Building 1 (Francis Ormond Building)
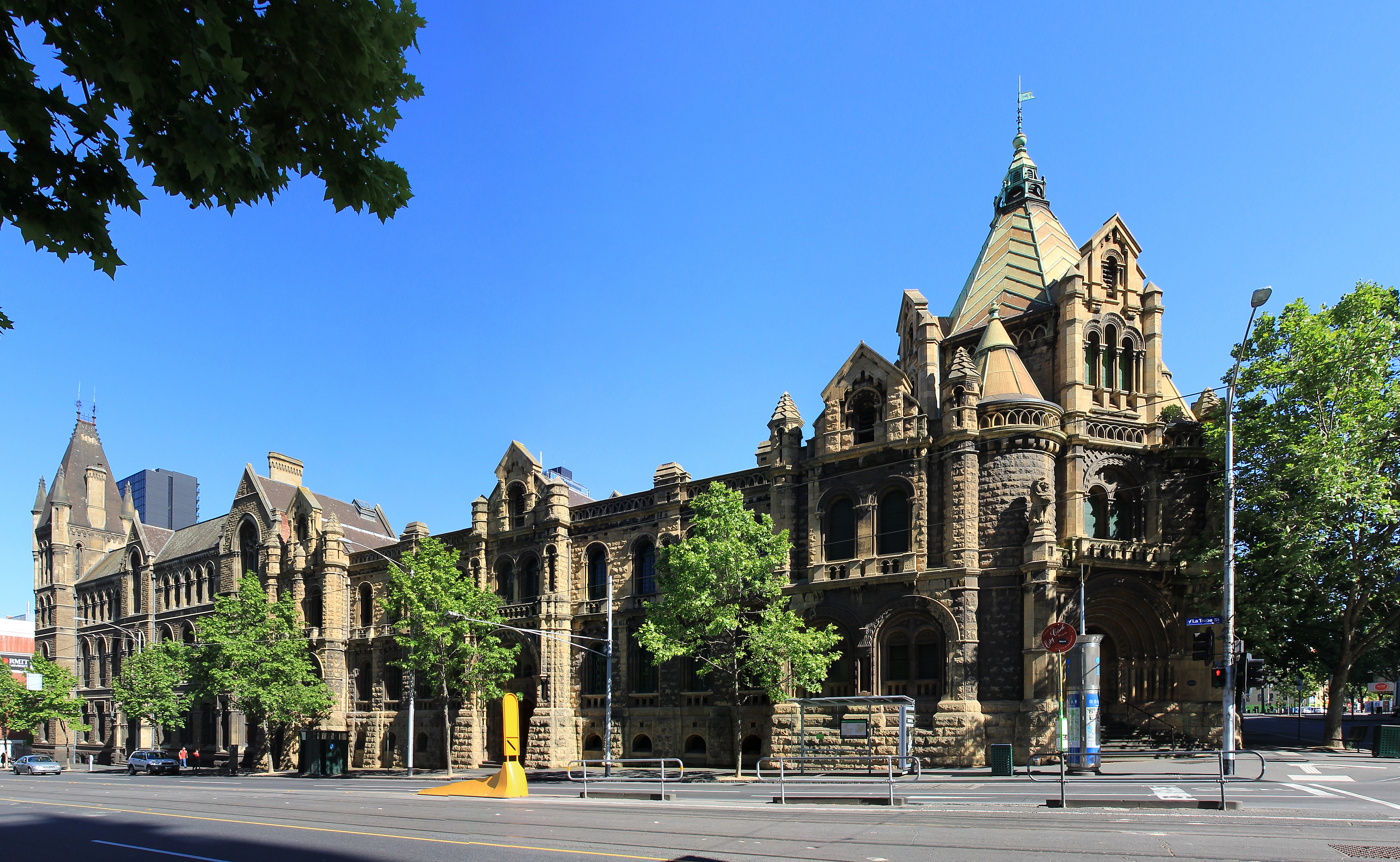
- former Working Men's College (left building) from La Trobe Street, 2008
- Type: college of further education
- Established: 1887
- Founder: Francis Ormond
- Location: Melbourne, Victoria, Australia; 37.8088°S 144.9652°E
- Nickname: "The College"

The Working Men's College was an Australian college of further education located in Melbourne, Victoria. It was founded in 1887 by a prominent Victorian parliamentarian and philanthropist, Francis Ormond.

The college was the predecessor to the current-day Royal Melbourne Institute of Technology (RMIT University). Today, the original building of the college is known as RMIT Building 1 (Francis Ormond Building).

== History ==
The Working Men’s College was founded in 1881 by a prominent grazier and philanthropist, Francis Ormond, who donated £5,000 towards the establishment of the college. The Council of the Melbourne Trades Hall then matched Ormond's initial donation by rallying its members. On 4 June 1887, the college opened in its purpose-built building on the corners of Bowen Street and La Trobe Street in Melbourne, with a gala ceremony. It became the third official provider of higher education in the new Colony of Victoria (the Melbourne Athenaeum was founded in 1839 and the University of Melbourne in 1853).

== Building ==
Stage 1: building permit dated 23 April 1885. Architect: Terry & Oakden and Nahum Barnet.
Stage 1 of the building was the "Bowen Street Wing" - which included the main lecture hall, workshops, classrooms and caretaker's quarters. It cost £10,600, which was paid by Ormond's initial donation and the further contribution of the Trades Hall Council.

The college building was constructed in two stages. The builder was "James Moore of Sandridge Road", South Melbourne.

Stage 2: construction contract dated 3 July 1890. Architect: Percy Oakden, Addison & Kemp.
The "La Trobe Street Wing" and the tower block were added in 1890, at a cost of £13,700. This addition was financed by the bequest of The Hon. Francis Ormond, who died the previous year, and some government funding. When completed in 1892, the La Trobe Street wing provided offices, College Council and instructors' rooms, large classrooms, and laboratories for photography and practical chemistry on the top floor.

Adjoining the college in the 1890s were the Supreme Court of Victoria (later the Melbourne Magistrates' Court) and the Melbourne Gaol - both which are now part of RMIT today.

21st Century refurbishment. Architect: Peter Elliot Architecture. Builder: Kane Constructions.
In 2008, 121 years after its opening, the building was registered with the Victorian Heritage Register. It is also registered as a "notable building" with the Melbourne City Council.

New features of the building include: rainwater harvesting, Solar water heating, intelligent lighting controls and systems; glazed stairways and galleries, new lift and reintroduction of period features. The refurbishment also includes the creation of a new university lawn with underground rainwater tanks. It was completed in 2011.

== Gallery ==
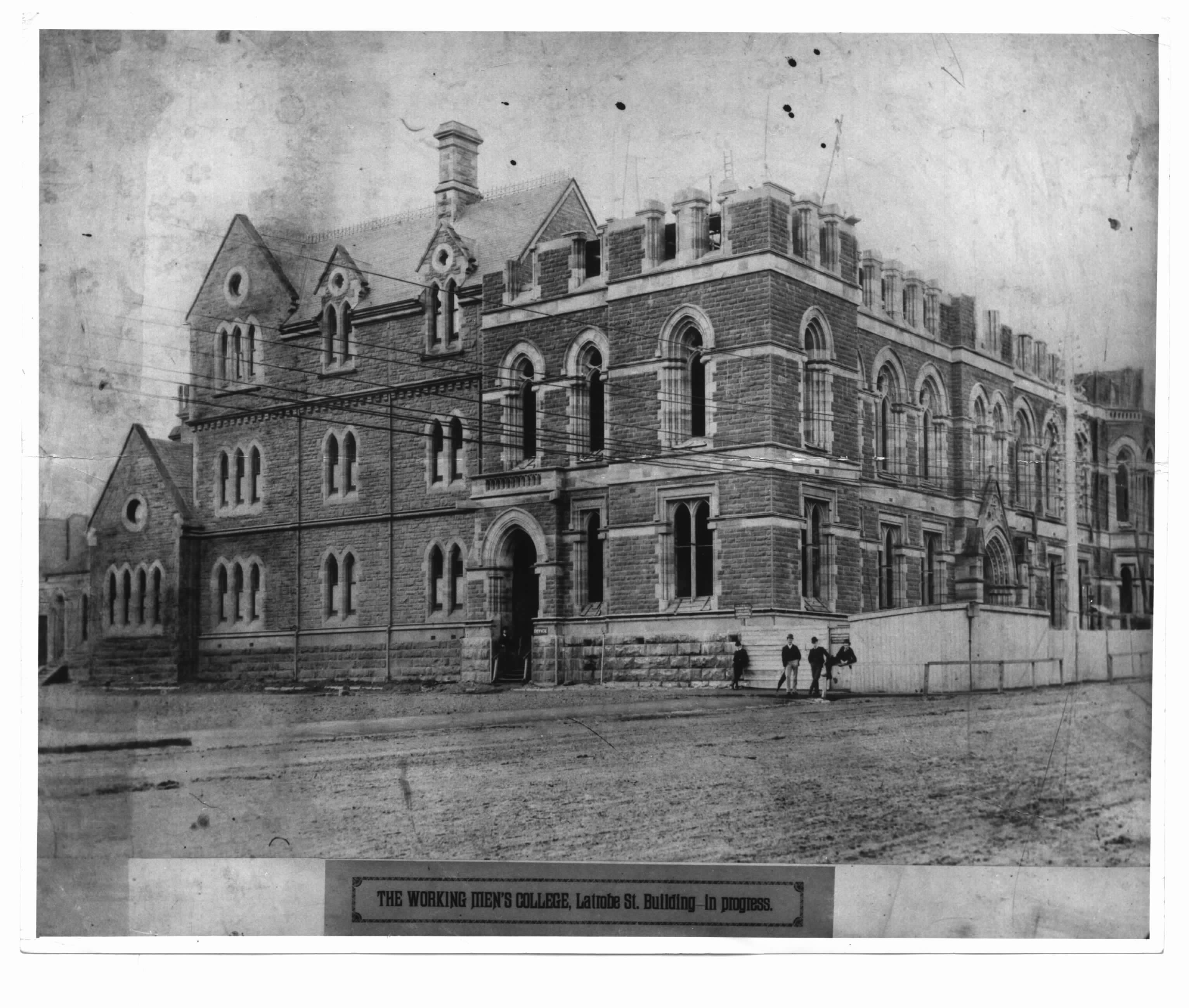
Construction of the Working Men's College c1886

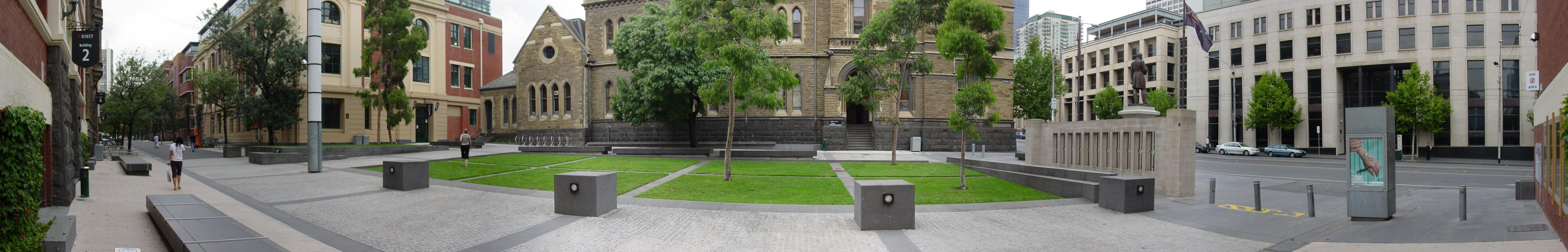
Ellis Court in front of the Working Men's College (on Bowen Street)

== See also ==
- RMIT University
- RMIT City, campus of which the court building is now a part
- Francis Ormond, founder
