= Marjorie Woolcock =

Australian painter and sculptor (1898–1965)

- Born: 1898; Ivanhoe, Victoria
- Died: 5 March 1998 (aged 99–100)
- Known for: Painting
- Movement: Modernism

Marjorie Woolcock (1898–5 March 1998) was an Australian painter and sculptor.

== Early life and training ==
Born in Ivanhoe to Robena Black and Frederick Woolcock, as one of three sisters, Marjorie grew up learning the piano and experimenting with art. She was schooled at Presbyterian Ladies College. She later performed at a party for the school with her sister Violet, who accompanied her piano with violin.

Woolcock would travel south from her home to sketch in Mordialloc, where she once had a chance encounter with the artist Margaret Baskerville. The plein air tradition of painting would inspire her later landscape work of Corryong, Victoria.

Her art training was far from formal, with private lessons from Frederick George Reynolds, and George Bell. She would continue to acknowledge the influence Bell had on her skill throughout her career. He opened her joint exhibition with artist Jessie Mackintosh in 1946.

She first developed her formal technique at sculpting, attending life class at the Victorian Artists' Society, and sculpture at the Workingmen's College (later known as the Royal Melbourne Institute of Technology). While at the Workingmen's College she took a class in 'Modelling the Human Figure From a Cast'. It wasn't until later that she studied painting, with her style being heavily influenced by Arnold Shore.

== Exhibiting artist ==
Marjorie exhibited frequently with the Melbourne Society of Women Painters, and also with the Victorian Artists Society, but there faced the prevalent prejudice against those of her gender; of her contribution to its October 1950 Spring exhibition, critic Alan Warren offered a passing mention: "Women painters, such as Violet Mclnnes, Dora Serle, Marjorie Woolcock, Dorothy Stephen, Roma Ward, Lesley Sinclair and Mary Macqueen have produced some competent pictures in their respective spheres."

In 1953 Marjorie took part in a spring exhibition at the Victorian Artists' Society which featured women as more than half the exhibitors shown. She was joined at this show by fellow artists Esther Paterson and Ola Cohn. Woolcock was a temporary art teacher at a girls' school in Brighton during the Second World War.

In later life she would travel to coastal areas of Victoria to paint, with her favourite places being Wilson's Promontory and Phillip Island.

== Exhibitions ==
- Melbourne Society of Women Painters, 1937
- Melbourne Society of Women Painters, Athenaeum Gallery, 1941
- Victorian Artists' Society, Eastern Hill, 1944
- Melbourne Society of Women Painters, Athenaeum Gallery, 1945
- Marjorie Woolcock and Jessie Mackintosh, Athenaeum Gallery, 1946
- Ballet Society exhibition, 1948
- Melbourne Contemporary Artists, Eastern Hill, 1949
- Melbourne Society of Women Painters, Athenaeum Gallery, 1950
- Victorian Artists' Society, spring 1950
- Melbourne Society of Women Painters, Athenaeum Gallery, 1951
- Victorian Artists' Society, 1954

== Collections ==
- Yachts at Dromana (1970), National Gallery of Victoria
- Castlemaine Art Museum (two works)
