= Lucy Newell (artist) =

Australian artist (1906–1987)

- Born: 29 September 1906; Castlemaine, Victoria
- Died: 22 May 1987 (aged 80); Woodend, Victoria
- Education: National Gallery School
- Known for: Painting, Textile printing

Lucy Colgate Newell (29 September 1906 – 22 May 1987) was an Australian artist noted for painting and textile printing.

== Biography ==
Newell was born in 1906 in Castlemaine, Victoria to artist Alice Newell and her husband Lt. Colonel Francis Sargent Newell, a solicitor. She was educated at St Catherine's School and took Saturday morning art classes at Castlemaine Technical School with Miss Naples. She later did classes in watercolour painting one afternoon a week with Miss Ethel Crook of Bendigo. Newell studied at the National Gallery School for five years under Bernard Hall but found she didn't much enjoy portraiture or oil painting, and instead took up textile printing with linocut on cotton fabric.

Her mother Alice was a co-founder of the Castlemaine Art Museum with whom Newell later exhibited in 1971 and which holds her artwork in their collection. She also has work in the National Gallery of Australia's collection and at Buda Historic Home & Garden.

Newell briefly had to give up artistic pursuits to care for her elderly parents, but spent ten years in Woodend creating work she wanted to do. She died there on 22 May 1987.
