= Bill Coleman (artist) =

William Coleman (1922–1993) was an Australian artist born in Ballarat, Victoria, Australia in 1922. He studied at Royal Melbourne Institute of Technology (RMIT), and then under George Bell for six years, before working as a photolithographic and cartographic artist for over 30 years. He died on 23 November 1992.

== Work ==
His work is represented in the New York Public Library Collection and several regional and private collections in Australia. A major retrospective exhibition in 1986 at the Bendigo, Ballarat and Sale Art Galleries (Victoria, Australia) brought critical acclaim.

His book illustrations include 'Natural History Picture Book for Children' 1961 and 'Our Garden Friends' 1963. During his career he also worked for Mintons Art Pottery, designing tiles and plates. His work is often compared with fellow contemporary Australian artists Robert Dickerson and John Brack. Coleman's art is highly collectible, and has steadily risen in value over the years.

== Awards ==
His awards include ACI award at VAS winter exhibition 1977, diploma for the best ten in composition Twenty-Eight Grand Prix International, France 1977 and won Applied Chemicals Pty Ltd Art Prize at VAS winter exhibition 1977.
