= Marion Jones (artist) =

Twentieth-century Australian portrait painter

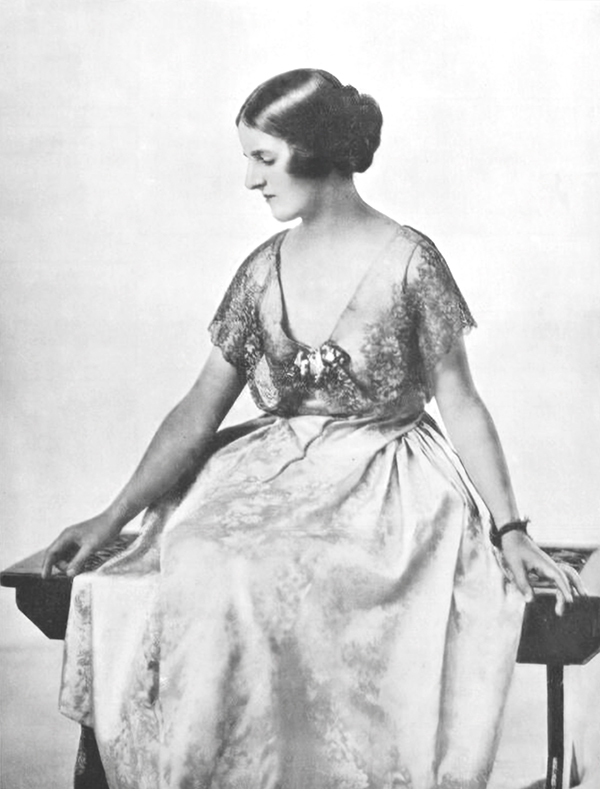
Portrait of 'Miss Marion Jones' from the cover of The Australian Home, 10 July 1925

Marion Jones (1897–1977) was an Australian portrait painter born in Bendigo, Victoria.

== Training ==
Jones attended Girton in Bendigo for her secondary education. Enrolled at the Bendigo School of Mines and Industries she studied art with instructor Arthur Woodward who also taught Inez Abbott, George H. Allen, Tom Bone, Ola Cohn, Madge Freeman, Agnes Goodsir, Norman Penrose, Louise Riggall, Elma Roach, Mary Shiress and John Walker.

Marion then studied in 1912–1917 at the National Gallery of Victoria Art School in Melbourne, under Lindsay Bernard Hall, winning its Travelling Scholarship in 1917. Delayed in taking up her scholarship because of WWI she exhibited her work in Australia before moving to London in 1921.

== Portraitist ==
Marion presented her Cui Bono under the terms of the National Gallery of Victoria Travelling Scholarship in 1924 and it is held in the collection. An article in The Australian Home of 10 July 1925, which displayed her photograph on its cover, records that the painting was exhibited at the Royal Academy in 1923

... and was highly commended upon by the London press, caricatured by London Punch and was mentioned in the novel Penelope by S. P. B. Mais. It was also reproduced in color by the Tatler (London).

Joan Kerr proposes that Cui Bono, depicting a ballerina in a tutu outstretched on a bench, apparently in distress as hinted by the pearl necklace spilling from her hand, is a 'problem picture'.

Seven of Jones' portraits are held in the Bendigo Art Gallery, including one of its treasurer John F. Warren, painted in 1918.

== Europe ==
Jones achieved some success in the London Portrait Society, exhibiting in both the Royal Academy and the Paris Salon in 1923, and the Royal Scottish Academy. She exhibited in the Australian Artists in Europe Exhibition of Paintings and Sculpture at the Royal College of Arts Gallery, London, 23 June – 12 July 1924.

Jones was popular in London society, and received numerous commissions for portraiture, including several notable figures such as Australian Prime Minister Billy Hughes.

== Australia ==
After returning to Australia in the late 1920s Jones exhibited with the Victoria Artists’ Society and was a finalist in the 1925 Archibald Prize with her portraits AJ Litchfield, Esq., Miss G Alice Jones, Mrs Frank Hewson, Sir Keith Smith and two self-portraits.

Jones abandoned her career as a painter in the mid-1930s after her works that remained in storage in London were destroyed in the London Blitz, stating that the world no longer had a place for 'art and beauty'. She died in Melbourne in 1977.

== Collections ==
- National Gallery of Victoria
- Bendigo Art Gallery
- Castlemaine Art Museum
