= Madge Freeman =

Australian 20th century watercolour painter of landscape and urban scenes, enamelist

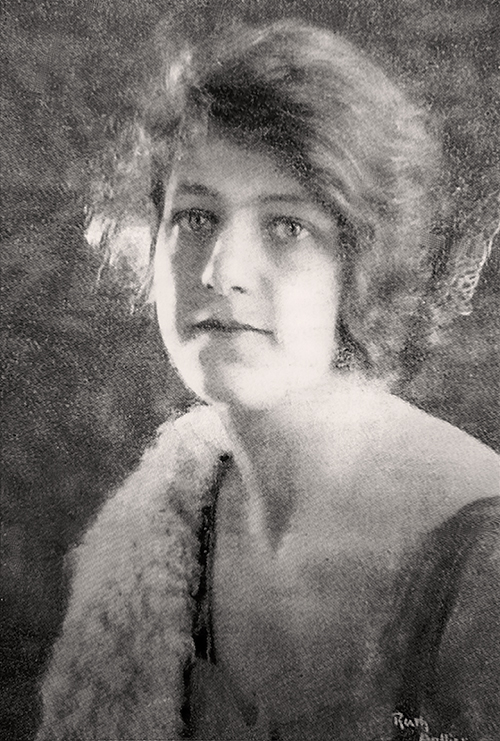
- Madge Freeman in 1922, photographed by Ruth Hollick for Youth
- Born: Frances Margot Freeman; 18 February 1895; Bendigo
- Died: 2 February 1977 (aged 81); Rosanna, Victoria
- Education: School of Mines, National Gallery of Victoria Art School
- Known for: watercolour, lacquerwork
- Style: post-impressionism, modernism
- Spouses: Lanfear Thompson (m. 1926; died 1929); Basil Davies (m. 1940; died 1977)
- Partner: Elma Roach
- Parents: George Henry Freeman (father); Frances Maud (née Ross) Freeman (mother)
- Relatives: brothers George, Charles, David, and (John) Lawrence
- Elected: president Melbourne Society of Women Painters and Sculptors
- Memorials: Madge Freeman prize administered by Bendigo Art Gallery

Frances Margot ('Madge') Freeman (1895–1977) was an Australian painter of landscape and urban scenes working internationally who was known for her watercolour, and for her craft of lacquerwork and enamelware.

== Early life and education ==
Born in Bendigo to Frances Maud (née Ross) and George Henry Freeman, Freeman was the older sibling of brother George 'Ross' Freeman (who served in World War I and World War II). Her father was a teacher, holding the post of Principal at Saint Andrews College and then Vice Principal at Bendigo High School. The family lived at Barkly Place (now Terrace) and their neighbours were the family of Ola Cohn.

While aged seven at Junior school in Saint Andrew’s College, Bendigo, where her father was principal in 1902, Freeman took out prizes for writing and sewing, one for sewing again in the following year and another for ‘Church Instruction’ in 1906, the year in which she and Ola Cohn played castanets in a school concert.

== Teaching qualification ==
In 1911, the Education Department issued results in which Freeman, studying under Arthur Woodward at the School of Mines, achieved an ‘Elementary Pass for ‘drawing from a flat example’ advancing to a Pass for ‘drawing from models or objects’ and ‘drawing plant forms from nature and in 1912 and 1913 passing the exam in ’drawing an ornament from a cast in outline’. Other tasks which she passed were ‘Elementary modelling’ and ‘modelling ornament from the cast (1913).

Freeman was employed in July 1913 as assistant art instructor at the Bendigo High School. Meanwhile she continued study at the School of Mines, receiving a Pass in ‘Modelling Human Figure from Cast’ and an ‘Advanced Grade 1 Pass’ in ‘Modelled Design’. She received her Secondary Certificate as a Drawing Teacher in December 1914.

== Socialite ==
In 1914, the Bendigo Independent announced her debut at the Tennis Ball with her photograph being published in the Bendigonian. For a fancy dress ball in March 1915 at Girton College, as an ‘old girl’ of the school, she dressed as ‘Powder and Patches’ (an 18th-century aristocrat) and in May that year returned for a ‘Dickens Evening’ dressed as Dick Swiveller. For Australia Day celebrations in Bendigo, and to raise funds for soldiers at the local camp, Freeman joined ‘the Keystone Moving Picture Company’ in a street performance, and also another fundraiser, featuring ‘The Keystone Komedy Kompany’ at Bendigo’s Princess Theatre, in both of which she appeared as the silent movie dancer 'Carmencita.’ Freeman’s soldier brother Ross, a signaller, was stationed in Lemnos and newspapers noted that he was the chance recipient of some of his family's war donations.

== Art school ==
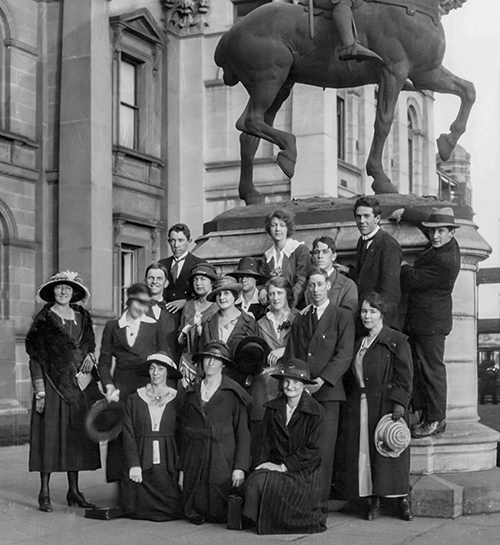
Madge Freeman (top, centre) amongst group of students from the National Gallery of Victoria Art School in Melbourne. (c 1920)

In February 1916, Freeman commenced her studies at the National Gallery of Victoria art schools under Bernard Hall, and where others from Bendigo, Clarice Beckett and her sister, and Elma Roach (from Shepparton), attended. They were reported as ‘working very hard’. They periodically returned home to Bendigo on holidays, where on one occasion Coleman hosted a student friend Joan Lindsay. Freeman appears in a 1920 snapshot, perched at centre top of a group of the students at the base of Emmanuel Fremiet's Joan of Arc statue outside the Art School (now the State Library forecourt).

Aside from her art studies, Freeman enjoyed her social life and performing; while in Melbourne she appeared at the Playhouse in a ‘moving tableau of early Melbourne’ in a dress worn at Government House in the 1850s, and in 1920 was invited to the Lord Mayor of Melbourne’s ball in honour of Edward VIII, the Prince of Wales. With Roach, in July 1920, she acted with other Gallery School students in an oriental romance based on Thomas Moore’s Lalla Rookh. She was a member, with Norah Gurdon, Dora Wilson, Elma Roach, Isabel May Tweddle, Helen Ogilvie, Louis McCubbin, and Daryl Lindsay of a club for former students formed in 1916 and presided by the oldest, Peter Kirk, which held a number of reunions receiving wide publicity in the early 1920s. In June 1923, members of the club were responsible for a fancy dress ball at St Kilda Town Hall, with Freeman, who dressed as a peacock for the event, contributing the huge stencilled lanterns that lit the venue. They next held an all-night dance at St Mary’s Hall in East St Kilda on 31 August 1923.

== Artist ==
Freeman was invited with Joan Lindsay to the Crivelli’s at Ferrars Place, Albert Park to a dance celebrating Rene Crivielli’s Legion of Honour, and in January 1923 spent time at his family's Mount Macedon property to break from sketching in the Malmsbury district where she, and probably Elma too, were taught watercolour techniques by Matthew James MacNally who was working there beside Harold Herbert.

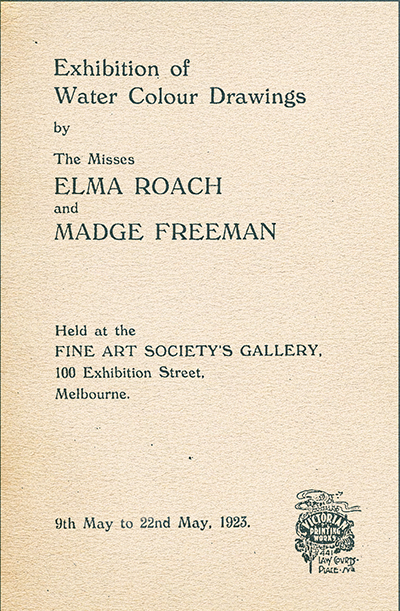
Catalogue (cover) of Exhibition of Water Colour Drawings by Elma Roach and Madge Freeman, Fine Art Society's Gallery, 100 Exhibition St. May, 1923.

Freeman and Elma Roach formed a close alliance and in March 1923 rented a cottage in Mooroolbark where they made paintings toward a joint exhibition that opened the following May. The reviewer Alexander Colquhoun, though gently critical of Roach’s technical shortcomings, in Freeman’s work found ‘more technical grip and a better sense of values,’ continuing that she showed ‘a creditable disinclination to rely on a pretty water-color manner and a consistent striving after true definition.’ Arthur Streeton in the Argus, while acknowledging that this was their first exhibition so ‘rather immature’, agreed that ‘Miss Freeman reveals herself as the better craftsman [sic], and displays an interesting sense of colour to which is added free handling of pigment’. The show received kind attention also from The Age, whose critic made no distinction between the artists’ capabilities and remarked that their works were ‘distinctly Australian in atmosphere and subject matter’ while The Australasian merely repeated Streeton’s commentary. George Bell, writing in the Sun News-Pictorial under a heading ‘Gums and Glimpses’ saw promise in how:

Madge Freeman expresses the white gum in all its poetic beauty, and is tenderly sympathetic with the atmosphere of her skies. The freedom, the clear, true palette she uses, and her forthright work throughout mark her as an artist of whom more will be heard.

Only weeks later the pair contributed to the display and sale of arts and crafts at the Melbourne Town Hall. Their artefacts, which were reported to have ‘drawn a crowd’, included ‘hair combs, umbrella handles, egg cups, serviette rings, bag handles, hat pins and quaint pendants dangling on necklets of black ribbon’ all in ‘polished, tinted and painted woods.’ Another show of their 'Madgelma' branded lacquerware including powder boxes, card trays, fruit bowls and dress ornaments, was held in Jessie Traill’s Collins Street studio for Christmas shoppers, and was noted in Table Talk.

== Europe and Africa ==
In 1923, numbers of former National Gallery students had left Australia to continue studying or exhibiting in Paris, London or America, including Ethel Spowers, Edith Grieve, Nancy Lyle, and Lilian Pentland, and winners of the Gallery's travelling scholarship Marion Jones, Adelaide Perry, and Laurie Honey (a.k.a. Taylor). Freeman and Roach were saving from their craft sales for their own overseas excursion which they planned for 1924, and spent the early weeks of that year bidding farewell to friends and family, then departed for London, travelling second-class on the SS Medic on 16 February that year.

In England, they settled in the Chelsea artists’ precinct. There, they briefly attended the Slade School under the tutelage of Henry Tonks. On 23 June Princess Louise, Duchess of Argyll opened an exhibit of Australian artists that included work by Freeman, that was hailed by Sydney’s The Sun newspaper critic as ‘Healthy Art,’ having been told that the London organisers were ‘glad to find that Australian art continues to be healthy and vigorous, rebuffing the decadence shown by the freak schools’ (by which modernism was meant). Freeman encountered other Australian artists also in Paris. Her assimilation was rapid; in May 1925 she had a work accepted for the Paris Salon. The two friends shared flats in London and Paris and embarked on painting journeys across France, Italy, Spain, and North Africa. In St Ives, Cornwall, they shared a studio with Gwen Horne. During their time in Paris, Freeman and Roach met and were taught by Adolphe Milich (1884 - 1964), a French painter and teacher originally from Poland. Milich was associated with the School of Paris and specialised in oil and watercolour paintings of a wide range of subject matter. His artistic approach, heavily influenced by Paul Cézanne, had a profound impact on the Australian artists.

By October Freeman and Roach had arrived in Italy where they were painting in Venice and Choggia, The Age describing them as ‘good draftsmen [sic], good colorists; both understand light, shadows and mass, and both have the strong feeling for sentiment and against sentimentality, for vitality and against pictorial incident and mere anecdote’ with Roach’s approach being devoted to a ‘poetic element’ and Freeman’s ‘more detached,...making her subject speak more obviously for itself.’ The latter sent her Reflections, Choggia for the first exhibition of the year at the New Gallery, 107 Elizabeth Street, Melbourne. Freeman returned to France in early 1926, where she endured a freezing winter. In October Table Talk drew attention to Freeman’s Bendigo origins in announcing an exhibition at Bendigo Art Gallery that included Marion Jones and other ‘ex-Bendigonians who have made a name for themselves In the old world’.

Late in 1926 Freeman, then aged 31, met and married in Kensington mining engineer Lanfear Thompson from Western Australia a government contractor due to work in Africa. Freeman had met Thompson as a child. After a honeymoon motor tour of rural England they initially settled in Obuasi, West Africa (Ghana), and despite The Bulletin report that she had 'evidently abandoned ideas of an art career', she resumed her painting when they visited Kumasi, Ashanti as guests of Justice and Mrs. McDowell, where she found the landscape reminiscent of Australia. before staying in Western Australia, and visiting Bendigo in December 1926. She travelled to Belgium and London in August 1927 with Ruth Howell. After working as manager of the Bibiani gold mine, Freeman's husband died of malaria aged 37 in a London nursing home on 25 March 1929.

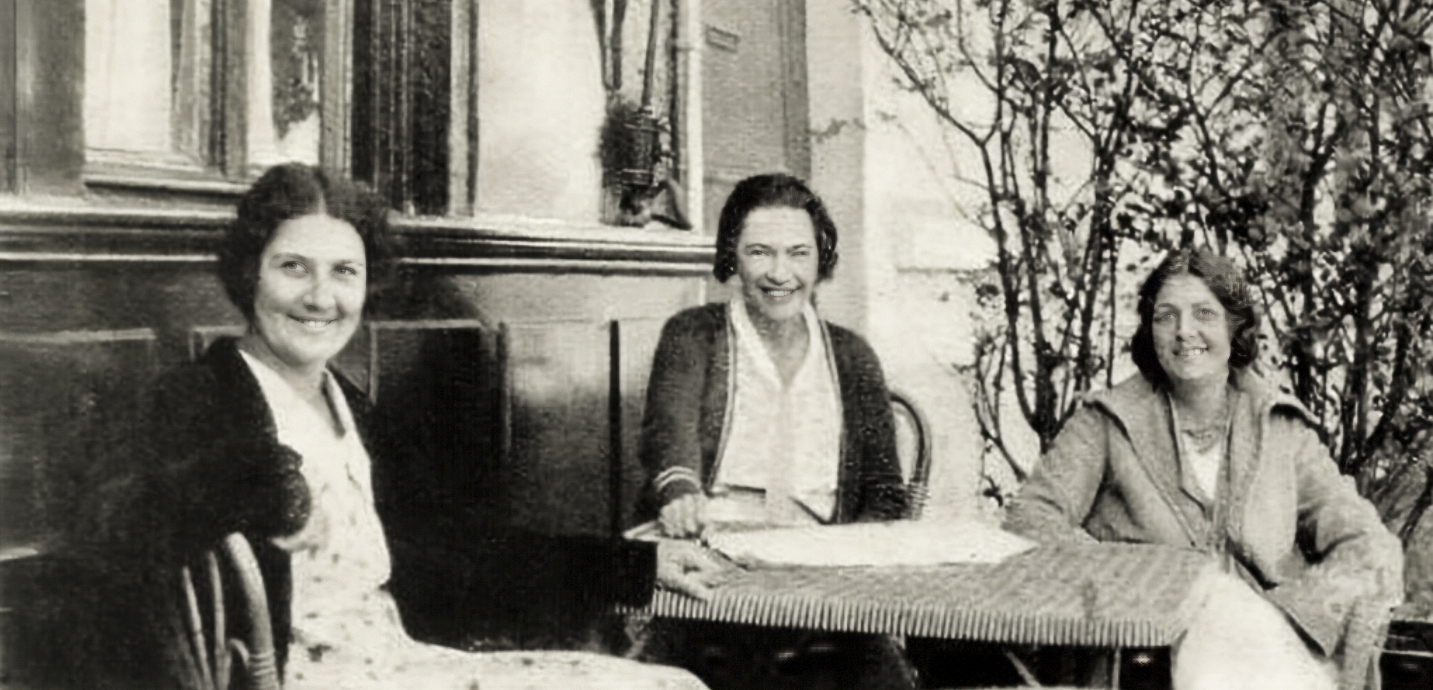
Madge Freeman, Helen Stewart, Dina Roach at Caudebec-en-Caux, Normandy. Photo: The Home: An Australian Quarterly. 1 January 1932

Back in Melbourne in 1930, Freeman shared a studio with Margaret McLean in Collins Street and continued exhibiting, showing her watercolours of European scenes alongside Roach’s at the Athenaeum Gallery, to a favourable review by Harold Herbert, before holding a one-person show at the Karrakatta Club Hall, Perth, where she stayed with Lanfear’s brother Dr Ashburton Thompson, then announced her intention to return to London for further studies. In November that year she was in Paris studying with André Lhote, and staying with Elma Roach and Helen Stewart in a large flat with an attached studio amongst seven other studios. Roach, a frequent correspondent to newspapers, wrote to The Herald to describe how those who, like them, studying art in Paris were: ‘progressing and getting away from the 'Victorianism' which has been such an enemy to Art […] The modern art is wonderfully interesting, and men such as Van Gogh, Cezanne, Pissarro, Matisse, etc., are very much appreciated— it is wonderful being able to see their works.’

The pair returned to Cheyne Walk, Chelsea in February 1932, where they had befriended theatre director Molly Ick (W. R. Campbell) whose farewell Freeman hosted in June. Freeman herself left the city for Málaga, Spain to walk through and paint picturesque villages, to Ronda, during 1933, where she was soon joined by Roach. They returned to Paris and Milich's studio in early 1934.

== Reception ==
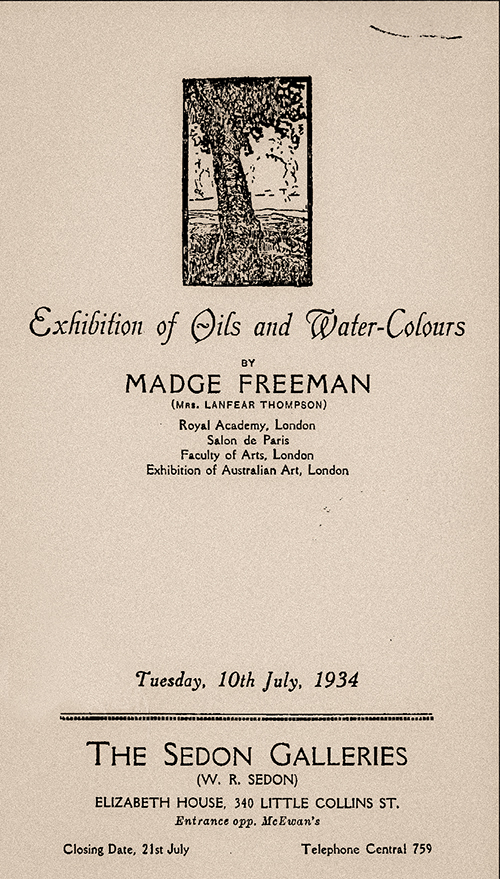
Madge Freeman solo exhibition 1934, Sedon Gallery Catalogue cover

Over 10–21 July 1934 Freeman, having sent work from overseas, held an exhibition at Sedon Galleries at 340 Little Collins Street which drew wide attention. The catalogue is divided into sections 'England', 'France', 'Italy', Spain', and Gold Coast' (Africa), and prices ranged from fifteen guineas (worth A$1,551.60 in 2024) for the most expensive, to four for the cheapest (A$413.80 in 2024). In their reviews Blamire Young and Arthur Streeton felt compelled to give her advice coloured by their perception of her as purely a water-colourist. Young (who specialised in that medium himself) offered that the while the watercolours were fresh, the oils lacked attention to texture. Streeton was condescending, hinting that she was proficient but a merely aspiring artist who ‘with increased and long study [...] will give a more complete and more varied technical expression in her works.’ Alexander Colquhoun, in The Age, while appreciating more enthusiastically a number of her works in both mediums, found that Freeman is ‘more at home in the lighter medium,’ and of her later works made in Spain, remarks that ‘there is apparent what seems to be an undecided movement in the direction of modernism which misses alike the objective of the true modernist and that of the realist.’ He concludes that her difficulty lies with ‘representing the various features of the picture in their true space relationship to each other.’ Even Harold Herbert, Freeman’s companion in Malmsbury where both painted with MacNally to whose influence on her watercolours he refers, felt compelled in his review in The Australasian, to offer that she should heed Streeton’s thick, sure treatment of highlights and shadows as an exemplar, though concluding that:

Miss Freeman has developed a style of her own. As a whole the exhibition has much to commend it; the work is serious - too serious perhaps, lacking the verve and spontaneity that seem in separable from continental impressions of this kind. "Slap-dash, hit-or-mlss" tactics would be well worth while trying.

In July 1935, while resident in studios in Cheyne Walk, Chelsea, and just prior to her painting expedition to the South of France, Freeman’s work in the Salon des Tuileries was received favourably by the Paris newspapers. In 1936 when Bendigo Art Gallery purchased Freeman's work 'Still Life' it was the first time the Gallery had purchased a work of an artist born in Bendigo.

== Return to Australia ==
On 15 October 1935, Freeman arrived in Perth on the SS Orsova to stay with her former husband’s family, preceded by Roach who was planning to exhibit with her in Melbourne, for which city Madge departed on 5 November on the Strathnaver, with the intention of later returning to Europe. In an interview with the West Australian she allied herself to modernism: 'there is a decided swing away from the 'extraordinary,' while there is still no tendency to return to photographic art.’

The Perth Daily News, November 1935, also recorded Freeman's comments about working in Europe where over five years she had traveled and painted in England, Spain, Italy, Holland, and Belgium, and in Paris had been studying under Milich over 1934 and 1935. Of French artists she said they 'have a soul in their paintings, and a lot of effect is gained by the fact that they do not stress detail, but concentrate on the general impression of their subject.’ She found the south of Spain ‘uncivilised’ and she and her companions found it impossible to paint without police guarding them from hostile crowds of 'peasants.’

By November Freeman was in Melbourne preparing to hold a show there, and in The Argus she opined that realism was gaining ground over the ‘distortions’ of modernism. In her home town a committee of the Bendigo Art Gallery met in February 1936 to consider the purchase of one of Freeman’s works, ultimately deciding on a still life displayed in the Paris Salon which had been reviewed in the journal Beaux Arts. It was an acquisition The Herald’s art critic Basil Burdett described as ‘Bendigo's sole excursion into anything like modernity and a very creditable one, too.’ In a review of a 1940 exhibition of the Independent Group he singled out Freeman's 'Keilor Church' saying that there was 'nothing better' in the exhibition than this work, and noting that it was 'a more formal expression of Australian landscape than we are used to but one which sacrifices nothing of characteristic light and colour.'

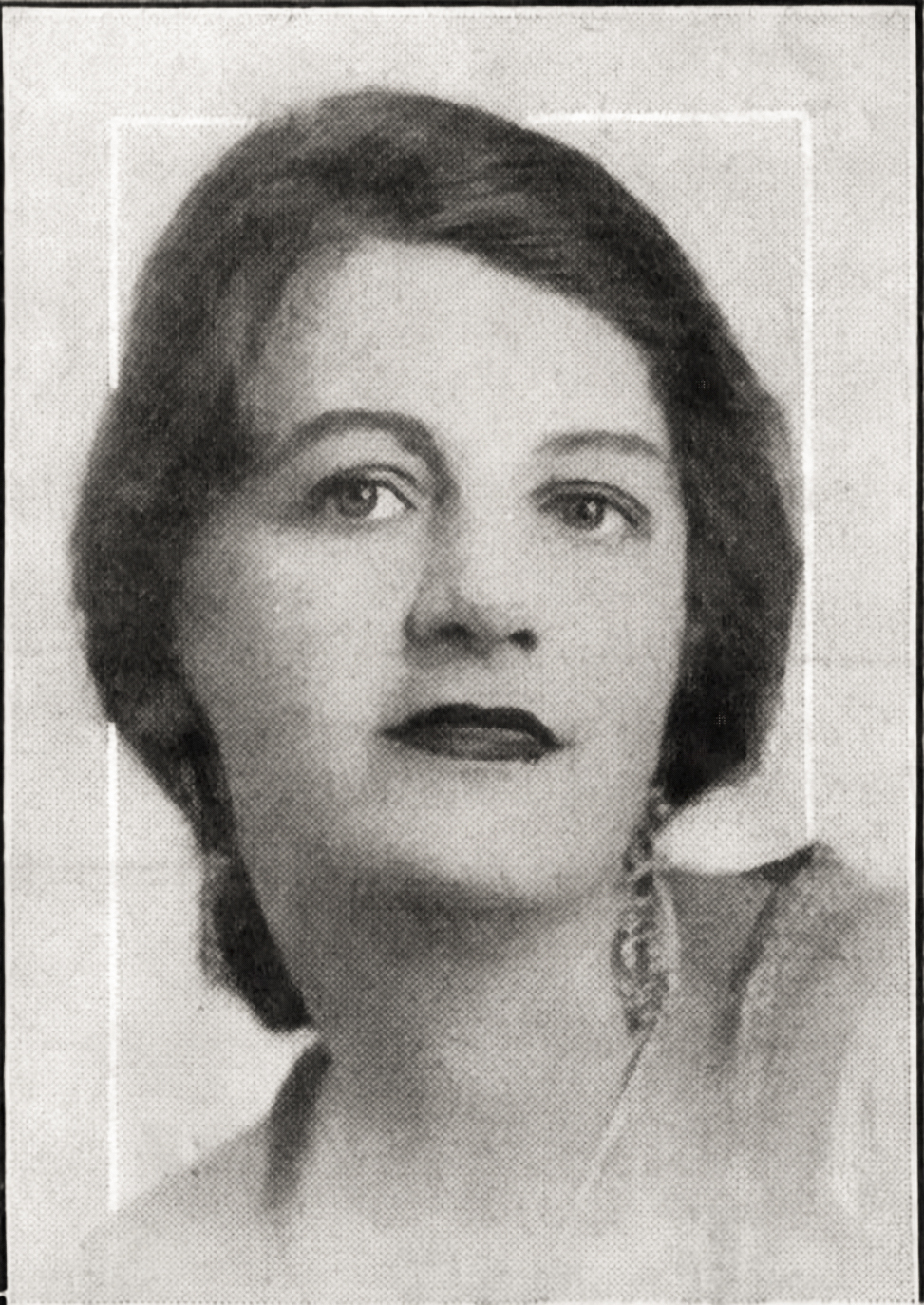
Pegg Clarke (1936) Portrait of Madge Freeman, from The Bulletin, 14 October 1936

In August that year Freeman gathered friends Pegg Clarke, Dora Wilson, Lillian White, Nell Patterson, Ola Cohn, Esther Paterson, Elma Roach, Nancy Grant, Norah Gurdon, Edith, wife of George Bell and Harriet, wife of the recently deceased Bernard Hall, Dora Serle, and several Gallery School students, in her new studio and accommodation in a former stable and loft, dubbed ‘Madge’s Mews’, in Gipps Street, East Melbourne, set poetically in The Bulletin as 'an example of what transformations upon a disused stable can be effected by paint and varnish, gay cushions, crochet rag rugs on the floor and the afternoon sun pouring through the windows.' She was reported as considering exhibiting the Spanish paintings for their topicality given the ongoing Civil War in that country.

On 30 July 1937 in Bendigo Freeman’s father died, and from 1938-1939 Madge returned to live with her 67-year-old mother at her old home in Barkly Place, Bendigo, where she held classes in her studio, with some of the students being children. Over the summer of 1937–38 she made paintings of the mines in Bendigo, intrigued by their ‘wonderful color, with golden colored earth contrasting with grey at the poppet head, and marvellous lights in the early morning and late afternoon.’ They were works Freeman hung at the 1938 Victorian Artists’ Society Autumn Exhibition, where they were favourably reviewed by George Bell and Basil Burdett who in a survey, 'Modern Art in Melbourne', places Freeman and Elma Roach among artists 'who have brought back with them from Paris [an] aspect of contemporary European painting unfamiliar to Australian eyes.' Bell and Freeman subsequently struck up a friendship. Reproductions of her works, a still life and a view of a Bendigo mine appeared, with two by Roach, in that same issue of Art in Australia between those of Murray Griffin and Rupert Bunny. Later that year Roach moved from her Collins street studio into one next door to Freeman's stables in Gipps Street. Into the loft of the latter Danila Vassilieff temporarily moved his studio before building 'Stonygrad' in Warrandyte.

Basil Burdett continued to favour Freeman in his 1938 reviews; of the Victorian Artists’ Society spring exhibition, in which he rated her as one of the ‘progressives’; and he mentions her first in discussing the Society of Women Painters (previously named the Women's Art Club), writing that ‘individual standards are well maintained in most cases, [and] occasionally excelled, as in the case of Madge Freeman. Her "By the Wharf" (No. 32) is a first-rate sketch, swift and sure, freeiy painted and good in color.’ The conservative Harold Herbert however was dismissive of her Sanary as a’ half-baked attempt at a "modern" means of expression.

== World War Two ==
In 1939, Freeman contributed work to the Bush Fire Fund art union. With the donations of 129 works by artists displayed at the Athenaeum in February, £770 was raised. In March she was elected president of the Melbourne Society of Women Painters, and presented on 4 May a talk on ‘The Customs of the natives of the Gold Coast of West Africa’ at a meeting of the society at the Victoria League, at which event the members formed a Red Cross group to assist its work during WW2, and in October 1939 joined other artist societies in an entertainments committee of the Lord Mayors Red Cross War Appeal Fund, with a proposal for a fundraising pageant, and an early outcome was a bazaar selling work of women artists in a shop in the Block Arcade, Melbourne. The combined artist subcommittee of the Red Cross Appeal in March 1940 assisted in selling 30,000 ‘lucky envelopes,’ all of which contained some prize, ‘big or small’. Freeman, in another effort, invited members of the public to assist, each paying 6d for a dab of paint, in finishing a painting she had begun.

In June 1939, Freeman joined the Independent Group for its support of individuals without allegiance to a specific school, though most, like her, were post-impressionists and early modernists, and together showed their paintings annually.

In the midst of mobilisation for WW2, and as a welcome distraction from the hostilities, came Basil Burdett’s controversial 1939 Herald Exhibition of French and British Contemporary Art in the Melbourne Town Hall. Madge Freeman joined George Bell, Arnold Shore, William Frater, Norman MacGeorge, Ola Cohn and John Reed in delivering lectures on its artists and their works to the public, presentations which continued even after the removal of the show to Sydney. Freeman was one of a number of artists who promoted the value of the exhibition, for its provocative interpretations of life.

Freeman’s work appeared in the inaugural Contemporary Art Society exhibition in Melbourne in 1939 with Dora Serle, Norman Macgeorge, Sybil Craig, Mary Finnin, Isabel Tweddle, Eric Thake, and Alan Sumner.

In the 1940s, Freeman associated with Lina Bryans and her Darebin Bridge House ('Pink Hotel') group of the conservative modernist members of the Contemporary Art Society; Norman Macgeorge, Clive Stephen, Isobel Tweddle and Rupert Bunny and old friends including Sybil Craig, Guelda Pyke, Elma Roach, and Ola Cohn who circulated amongst the Meanjin literary and intellectual set.

== Remarriage ==
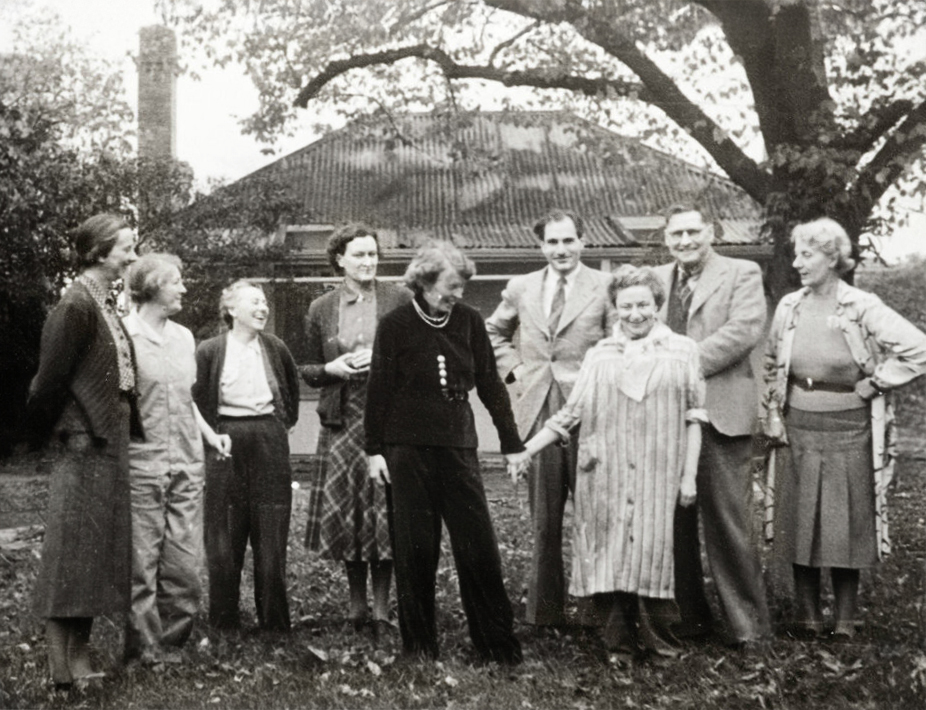
Artists outside Madge Freeman Davis' studio in William St, South Yarra c.1940s. L to R: Nancy Grant; Madge Freeman Davis; Jean Barrett; Madeline Crump; Mary Cecil Allen (centre); our model; Guelda Pyke; George Bell; Mrs Clive Stephen (Dorothy). University of Melbourne Archives

In 1940 Freeman married Basil Davies, a Gippsland farmer, and settled with him at his property Koongarra at Longwarry, but kept a studio in her grandfather's house at South Yarra. She exhibited with the Melbourne Society of Women Painters and Sculptors in their annual exhibitions until 1971, and held a solo show at Georges Gallery in May 1951 from which the Bendigo Gallery purchased the Flower Study and the National Gallery of Victoria a watercolour, Road to Heyfield. The show was reviewed by the unnamed Age newspaper art critic who opined that ‘a theory is necessary to the production of art’ and that though Freeman’s formula was attached to design:

Freeman does not […] follow a straight path; she is apparently wavering between description and a realm In which symbols are important. Although this feeling of unsureness permeates the entire display, it Is not evident in individual compositions. Her calm, clean style has ensured a fairly even standard of achievement in all branches.

The couple travelled overseas during 1952 and 1953 visiting European galleries and stud farms. On her return the Lyceum Club, where for fifteen years she was convenor of their Art Circle, showed a retrospective of her work. She and Basil moved to Lower Plenty where Madge resumed painting en plein air.

== Later life ==
Madge’s increasing poor health caused their move in 1960 to Ivanhoe where in the early 1970s she was placed in residential care, where she died in February 1977.

In 1979, Basil Davies' estate established a Madge Freeman prize to be administered by the Bendigo Art Gallery which in 1981 staged a retrospective exhibition of Madge Freeman’s work.

== Exhibitions ==
- 1923, from 9 May: Joint exhibition by Madge Freeman and Elma Roach. Fine Art Society's Gallery, 100 Exhibition St., Melbourne
- 1923, June: Display at Melbourne Town Hall of painted woodcraft by Freeman and Roach
- 1923, 16 June–7 July: Bendigo Art Society's annual exhibition, with Charles Wheeler, H. Septimus Power, Charles D. Richardson, Dora L. Wilson, Allan. T. Bernaldo and Madge Freeman. Bendigo Art Gallery
- 1923, from 22 August: The Women's Art Club, with Cumbrae Stewart, Dora Wilson, Norah Gurdon, Madge Freeman, Jessie Traill, and A. M. E. Bale. Athenaeum, 188 Collins Street, Melbourne
- 1923, 11–18 December: joint exhibition of craftwork at Jessie Traill’s studio. Edwards Building, 178 Collins St., Melbourne
- 1924, from 23 June: Exhibition of Australian Art, 'Australian Artists in Europe', with Abby (Abraham) Alston, David Baker, Leslie Bowles, Penleigh Boyd, Rupert Bunny, Isaac M. Cohen, Charles Conder, George James Coates, Ethel Carrick-Fox, Bessie Davidson, Roy De Maistre, E. Phillips Fox, Madge Freeman, Bessie Gibson, Agnes Goodsir, Elioth Gruner, Clewin Harcourt, Hans Heysen, Marion Jones, W.A. Kermode, George Lambert, Fred Leis tt, Sydney Long, John Longstaff, W. Lister, Dora Meeson, Harold Parker, Adelaide Perry, H. A. Power, James Quinn, Janet Cumbrae Stewart, Arthur Streeton, and Laurence B. Tayler. Royal College of Arts gallery, London
- 1924, 1–11 October: Inclusion in absentia in Women's Art Club group show. Athenaeum, 188 Collins Street, Melbourne
- 1925, from 22 August: Inclusion in absentia with Cumbrae Stewart, Marion Jones, and Olga Cohn amongst 250 other entries in Bendigo Art Society group exhibition. Bendigo Art Gallery
- 1926, January: Group exhibition, works by Blamire Young, Albert E. Newbury, Harold Herbert, Charles Wheeler, George Benson, A. M. E. Bale, H. Johnson, Vida Lahey, James Jackson, Albert Collin, Muir Auld, John Eldershaw, and Madge Freeman. The New Gallery, 107 Elizabeth St., Melbourne
- 1926, October: Group exhibition. Bendigo Art Gallery
- 1926, from 1 December: The Women's Art Club annual group show. The Athenaeum gallery.
- 1927, 2 March: Sale of the James Dyer Collection, with work by Henry Burn, Blamire Young, Norman Lindsay, Thea Proctor, Charles Sims, Penleigh Boyd, Hans Heysen, George Coates, and "Drying Sails, Chioggia," by Madge Freeman
- 1927, June: 1927 Royal Academy, London
- 1928: First One-Woman Exhibition, Bendigo Art Gallery, Memorial Hall
- 1928, March: Group exhibition. Sedon Gallery, 231 Elizabeth St., Melbourne
- 1928, from 3 October: The Women's Art Club 19th Annual Exhibition. Athenaeum Gallery
- 1928, from 31 October: Solo exhibition opened by Arthur Woodward. Soldiers’ Memorial Hall, Bendigo
- 1930, May: Group exhibition. Athenaeum Gallery
- 1930, 12–25 August: Group show, Margaret MacLean’s studio, 125 Collins Street.
- 1930, 26–29 September: Solo exhibition of watercolours. Karrakatta Club Hall, Western Australia
- 1934, 10–21: Solo exhibition of oils and watercolours of Europe and Africa by Madge Freeman. Sedon Galleries
- 1935, July: entrant in the Salon des Tuileries
- 1936, to 11 November: Enamelwork by Freeman and Roach exhibited at Roach’s studio, 117 Collins Street, Melbourne, then at Freeman’s Gipps Street studio
- 1936, from 2 December: Freeman and Roach enamelwork, Klytie Schlater (Pate) hand-carved pottery, and pottery by Phillipa James. Margaret Maclean's Gallery, Kodak House, 252 Collins Street, Melbourne
- 1937, 1–24 December: A Christmas sale of works by M. McChesney Mathews, Elma Roach, Madge Freeman. Guelda Pyke, Ola Cohn. Tilda McVen and Klytie Sclater. Margaret Maclean's Gallery, Kodak House, 252 Collins Street, Melbourne
- 1938, from 26 April: Victorian Artists’ Society Autumn Exhibition.
- 1938, from 21 June–2 July: Fourth Exhibition of Group Twelve, Louise Thomas, Chrisma Wahlers, C. E. Bell, Ina Morris, Marjorie North, Clive Stephen, Mr. Robert Pulleine, George Bell, Arnold Shore, Roger James, Lady Barrett, Miss Cara Barrett, Moya Dyring, with invited artists Geoff Jones, Mr. Adrian Lawlor, Elma Roach, Madge Freeman, Margaret Long, Albert Tucker, and Nutter Buzacott. Athenaeum Gallery
- 1938, from 27 September: Victorian Artists’ Society, Albert Street, East Melbourne
- 1938, from 11 October: Society of Women Painters, Athenaeum Gallery
- 1939, 13–24 June: members of Independent Group E. Alsop, Madge Freeman, Grace Gardiner, Roger James, Margaret Pestell, Robert Pulleine, James Quinn, Elma Roach, Norman Macgeorge, Eveline Syme, Dora Serle, Louise Thomas and Dora Wilson. Athenaeum Gallery
- 1939, from 2 October: Melbourne Society of Women Painters, Athenaeum
- 1940, from 19 March: Exhibition of artworks donated in aid of the Red Cross. Athenaeum Gallery
- 1940, from 11 June: Second annual exhibition of the Independent Group. Athenaeum Gallery
- 1940, November: Society of Women Painters, Athenaeum Gallery
- 1941, 4–18 December: Forty Seven Painters. Clothilde Atyeo, Yvonne Atkinson, Edith Alsop, Frances Burke, George Bell, C.E. Bell, Mabel Crump, Jack Courier, Ola Cohn, Frances Derham, Russell Drysdale, Margaret Francis, Dorothea Francis, Madge Freeman, Grace Gardiner, Mira Gould, Genevieve Harrison, Jess Jones, Margaret MacLean, Bernard Lawson, M. Mercer, Colin MacGowan, Ina Morris, Maidie McWhirter, Marjorie North, Marjorie Rankin, Elma Roach, E.W. Syme, Constance Parkin, Dora Serle, Alan Sumner, Clive Stephen, David Strachan, Peter Purves Smith, Isabel Tweddle, Louise Thomas, Mary Torkington, Marjorie Woolcock, Joan Voyage, Joan Yonge, Chrisma Wahlers, Lowiny Wood, Sybil Craig
- 1941, 7–18 October: 1941 annual exhibition Melbourne Contemporary Artists, E. Alsop, Yvonne Atkinson, Clothilde Atyeo, C.E. Bell, George Bell, Rupert Bunny, Nutter Buzacott, J. Courier, Mabel Crump, Frances Derham, G. Russell Drysdale, Dorothea Francis, Margaret Francis, Madge Freeman, Grace Gardiner, G.A. Harrison, Bernard Lawson, M. McWhirter, M. Cockburn Mercer, Marjorie North, M. Rankin, Elma Roach, Clive Stephen, Connie Stokes, D. Stoner, Eveline Syme, Alan Sumner, Louise Thomas, Isabel Tweddle, Lowiny Wood, Marjorie Woolcock, Joan Yonge, and invitee Ola Cohn. Athenaeum Gallery
- 1941, 22 October–22 November: The Tasmanian Group of Painters 2nd annual exhibition. Tasmanian member artists represented were Gene Ashton, Winifred Biggins, Dorothy Bradford, Eileen Brooker, Harry Buckie, Jocelyn Burrows, Lucien Dechaineux, Marie Dechaineux, Robert Campbell, Joseph Connor, Eileen Crow, Edith Holmes, Mabel Hookey, Florence Jones, Amie Kingston, R.A.V. McCulloch, Isobel MacKenzie, Robert Montgomery, Joan Pitman, Phyllis Pitman, Oliffe Richmond, Florence Rodway, J.C. Smith, Dorothy Stoner, V.P. Webb, Laurence White, Isobel Oldham; Victorian invited artists represented were George Bell, Lina Bryans, W. Bush, N. Buzzacott, Mabel Crump, William Frater, Madge Freeman, Daryl Lindsay, M.S. McWhirter, A.M. Plante, John Rowell, Ruth Shakel, Arnold Shore, John Skeaping, Alan Sumner, E.W. Syme, Eric Thake, Louis Thomas, Albert Tucker, P. Tremills, Isobel Tweddle, Marjorie Woolcock, Harley Griffiths. Tasmanian Museum and Art Gallery
- 1945: First annual exhibition 1945, Artists exhibiting were E. Alsop, Wallace Anderson, Clothilde Atyeo, A.M.E. Bale, E. Monette Baxter, Tom Bell, J. Bergner, Arthur Boyd, Ian Bow, Lina Bryans, Nutter Buzacott, Victor E. Cobb, Valerie Cohen, Yvonne F. Cohen, W. Coleman, Elizabeth Colquhoun, F. Lawrence Coles, Noel Counihan, Sybil Craig, Peggy Crombie, Mabel Crump, Aileen Dent, Max Dimmack, Ailsa Donaldson, Ambrose Dyson, Esme Farmer, John Farmer, Alma Figuerola, Burton Fox, Madge Freeman, W. Frater, Grace Gardiner, Ina Gregory, Nornie Gude, W.G. Gulliver, Michael Hall, John Heath, Edward Heffernan, Roy Opie, Betty Paterson, Esther Paterson, J. Perceval, A. Plante, Muriel Pornett, James Quinn, M. Rankin, Jack Sampson, Dora Serle, Bruno Simon, David Sing, Colvin L. Smith, J.T. Smith, W. Spence, N.F. Suhr, Jean P. Sutherland, Jo. Sweatman, E.W. Syme, Arnold Shore, Stephany Taylor, George H. Tichauer, Louise Thomas, Violet Teague, Francis Roy Thompson, Rollo Thomson, Albert Tucker, Kit Turner, Danila Vassilieff, J. Wentcher, Tina Wentcher, James V. Wigley, Nora Wilkie, Dora L. Wilson, Noel Wood, Marjorie Woolcock, Joan Yonge, Marguerite Mahood. Velasquez Gallery, Tye & Co., Bourke Street [Melbourne].
- 1949, 22 February–4 March: Exhibition of pictures by Australian artists and loan collection of Indian art, in aid of the University Women's College Building Appeal. Tye's Gallery, 100 Bourke Street, Melbourne
- 1950, from 31 July: Independent Group. Stanley Coe Gallery
- 1950, October: Society of Women Painters annual exhibition. Victorian Artists’ Society Galleries
- 1950, to 8 December: Society of Women Painters. Tye’s Gallery
- 1951, 1–17 May: Paintings by Madge Freeman, opened by Louis McCubbin. Georges Gallery
- 1951, July: Drawings and Watercolours. Victorian Artists' Society
- 1956: Drawings and Prints - Melbourne contemporary artists: Dorothy Baker, George Bell, Barbara Brash, R.A. Center, William (Bill) Coleman, Dorothea Francis, Madge Freeman, Alan Foulkes, Ann Graham, Geoff Jones, Roger Kemp, Lesley Lawson, M.E. Lormer, Harry R. Mitchell, Anne Montgomery, Marjorie North, Harry Rosengrave, Ellen Rubbo, Richard Scales, D.K. Stoner, Eveline Syme, Elvrida M Verco, Percy Watson, Marjorie Woolcock. Peter Bray Gallery

=== Posthumous ===
- 1981, 21–23 November: Art Mart. Caulfield Arts Centre
- 1981, 16 March-26 April: Madge Freeman (1895-1977): Exhibition of Paintings Bendigo Art Gallery
- 1985, 7–30 March: Four Bendigo watercolourists. Bendigo Art Gallery
- 1988, 13 April: George Bell, Students and Friends, A Major Collection of Fine Australian Art of the 30s, 40s and 50s, Holland Fine Art, Double Bay, New South Wales.
- 1989, 9–16 October: Spring exhibition. Jim Alexander Gallery, East Malvern, Vic
- 1990, 20–27 May: Autumn exhibition. Jim Alexander Gallery, East Malvern, Vic
- 1992, 27 June–12 July: Ladies in Waiting. The Borough Galleries, 10 High Street, Eaglehawk
- 2002, 20 March-1 May: Lyceum Club 90th birthday exhibition. Marion Jones, Henrietta Gulliver, Mary Macqueen, Mrs. Alfred Deakin, May Vale, Dora Wilson, Aileen Dent, Marjorie McChesney Mathews, Janie Wilkinson Whyte, Ruby Winifred McCubbin, Pegg Clarke, Dora Meeson Coates, Ethel Carrick Fox, Edith Alsop, Josephine Muntz Adams, Dora Serle, John Mather, Jessie Traill, Ethel Spowers, Arthur Streeton, Madge Freeman, Esther Paterson, Hans Heysen, Janet Agnes Cumbrae Stewart, Anne Montgomery, Emanuel Phillips Fox, George Coates, Violet Teague, Rupert Bunny, Edith Alsop, Elsie Barlow, Bertha Merfield, Lois W. Baglin, Eveline Syme. Lyceum Club, Melbourne
- 2018: Intrepid Women: Australian Women in Paris 1900-1950, SH Ervin Gallery, Sydney.

== Collections ==
- National Gallery of Victoria
- Bendigo Art Gallery
- Castlemaine Art Museum

== Bibliography ==
- Gorman, Clem (2020), "24: Madge Freeman: A Steady Achiever", in Gorman, Therese (ed.), Intrpide: Australian Women Artists In Early Twentieth-Century France, Melbourne: Monash University Publishing, ISBN 9781925523928
- Kerr, Joan; National Women's Art Exhibition (Australia); Kerr, Joan (1995), Heritage : the national women's art book : 500 works by 500 Australian women artists from colonial times to 1955, Art and Australia; Roseville East, N.S.W.: distributed by Craftsman House, ISBN 978-976-641-045-2
- Peers, Juliette (1993), More than just gumtrees: a personal, social and artistic history of the Melbourne Society of Women Painters and Sculptors. Melbourne Society of Women Painters and Sculptors in association with Dawn Revival Press, Melbourne
- Roach, Elma; Freeman, Madge (1923), Exhibition of water colour drawings by the Misses Elma Roach and Madge Freeman : held at the Fine Art Society's Gallery, 100 Exhibition Street, Melbourne, 9th May to 22nd May, 1923, Victorian Printing Works, p. 354
