= Inez Abbott =

Australian water colour artist

- Born: Inez Marie Abbott; 1886; Bendigo, Victoria, Australia
- Died: 1957 (aged 70–71); Bendigo, Victoria, Australia
- Education: Girton Grammar School, Bendigo School of Mines, Academie Delecluse (Paris)
- Occupation: artist
- Known for: water colour
- Parents: Richard Hartley Smith Abbott (father); Mary Hannah Abbott (mother)
- Awards: finalist in the Wynne and Archibald Prizes

Inez Marie Abbott (1886–1957) (Note: Inez Abbbot's birthdate is 1886 according to her birth certificate and the Bendigo Historical Society records. Some sites such as the Bendigo Art Gallery and its catalogue of one of her exhibitions, mistakenly give the birthdate as 1896 which has been carried through in other documentation.) was an Australian water colour artist. She was one of the early Australian modernists who lived and worked in Europe in the 1920s and 30s, studied at the Academie Delecluse and exhibited in the Paris Salon. In the 1940s she was a finalist in the Art Gallery of New South Wales Wynne and Archibald prizes.

== Personal life ==
Inez Abbott came from a prominent Bendigo family. Her parents were Richard Hartley Smith Abbott and Mary Hannah Abbott. Richard Abbott was a Senator, businessman and president of the Bendigo Art Gallery, establishing the RHS Bequest fund.

== Art career ==
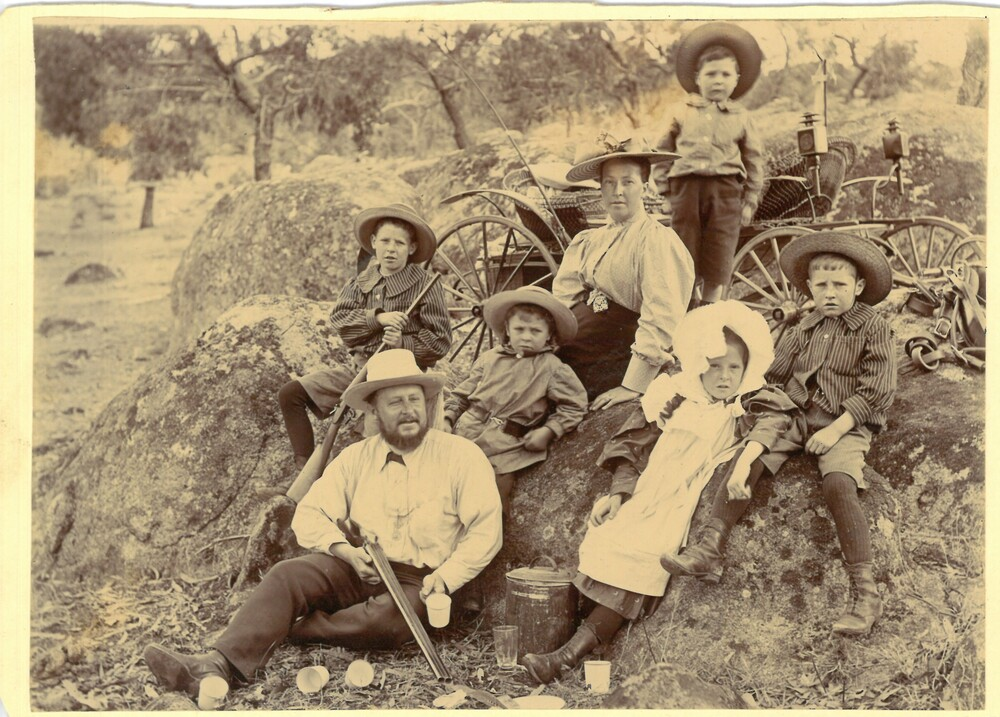
Inez Abbott in white smock with family, taken in 1895. In the collection of the Bendigo Historical Society.

Abbott studied at Girton Grammar School and later at the Bendigo School of Mines. She exhibited in the inaugural Bendigo Arts Society exhibition in 1920. She travelled to Europe in 1922, studying at the Academie Delecluse under Gaussen in Paris and later with Virgilio Constantini. She returned to Bendigo in the late 1920s but was back in London by 1932.

She exhibited in the Paris Salon as early as 1928 and was favourably reviewed. Other Australian artists who exhibited at the Paris Salons around that period were Rupert Bunny, Agnes Goodsir, Hilda Rix-Nicholas, Max Meldrum and Ethel Carrick Fox. She also exhibited at the Galerie Charpentier. In 1938 one of her paintings of gum trees and wattle was purchased for the Jeu de Paume Museum, now in the Centre Pompidou. (Note: The letter from "R Vallaud" about the acquisition, may be from Rose Valland, then an assistant curator at Jeu de Paume, formerly an annexe to the Musée du Luxembourg with a Contemporary Foreign Schools section.)

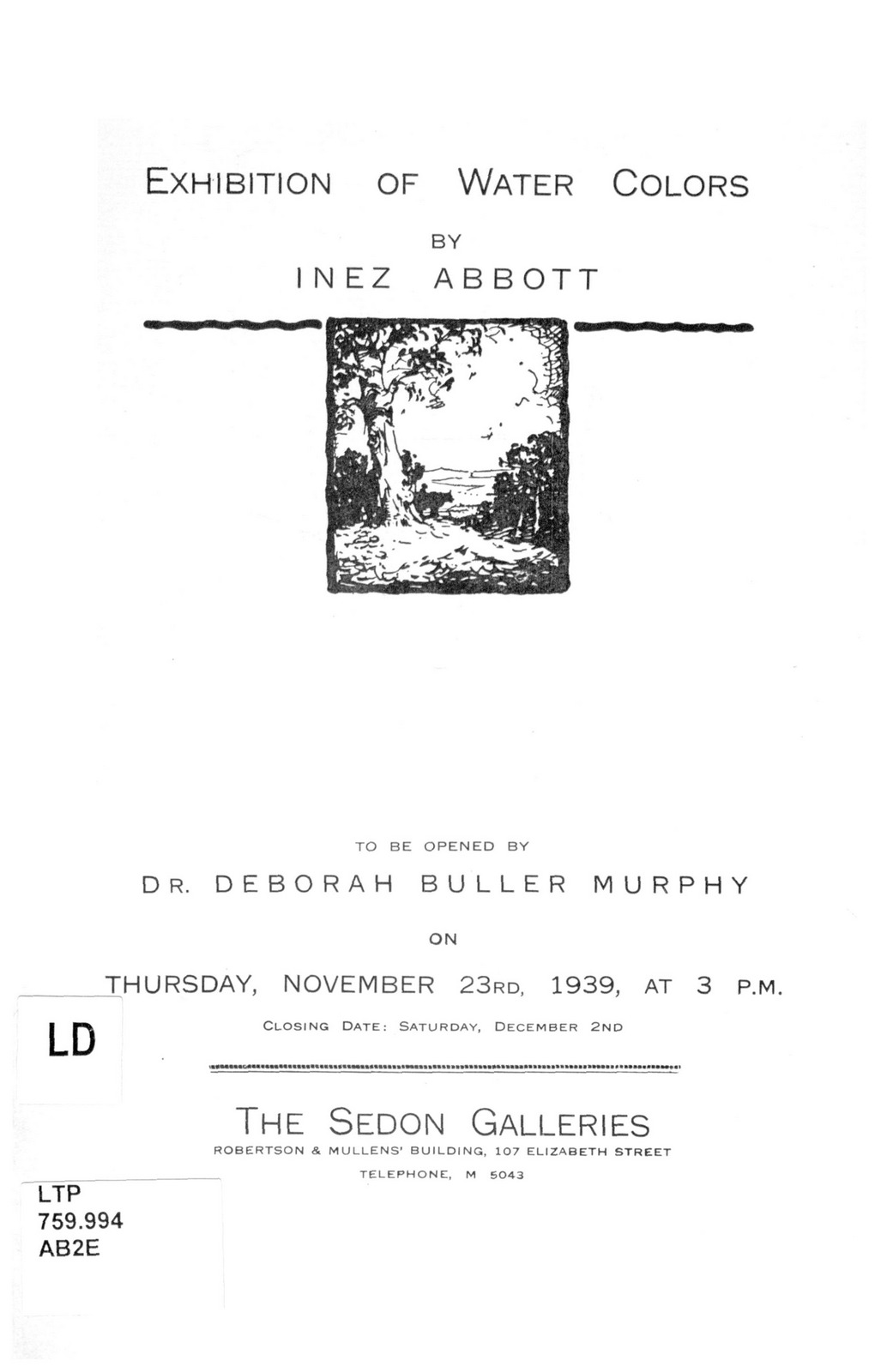
Cover page of catalogue of exhibition of water colours by Inez Abbott at The Sedon Galleries. Source: State Library Victoria

She returned to Bendigo in 1938 and her work was exhibited in the Felton Centenary exhibition at the Fine Art Society in Melbourne in 1939 and at Sedon Galleries in Melbourne in 1939. Between 1940 and 1944 she was a finalist in the Wynne and Archibald Prizes exhibited at the Art Gallery of New South Wales.

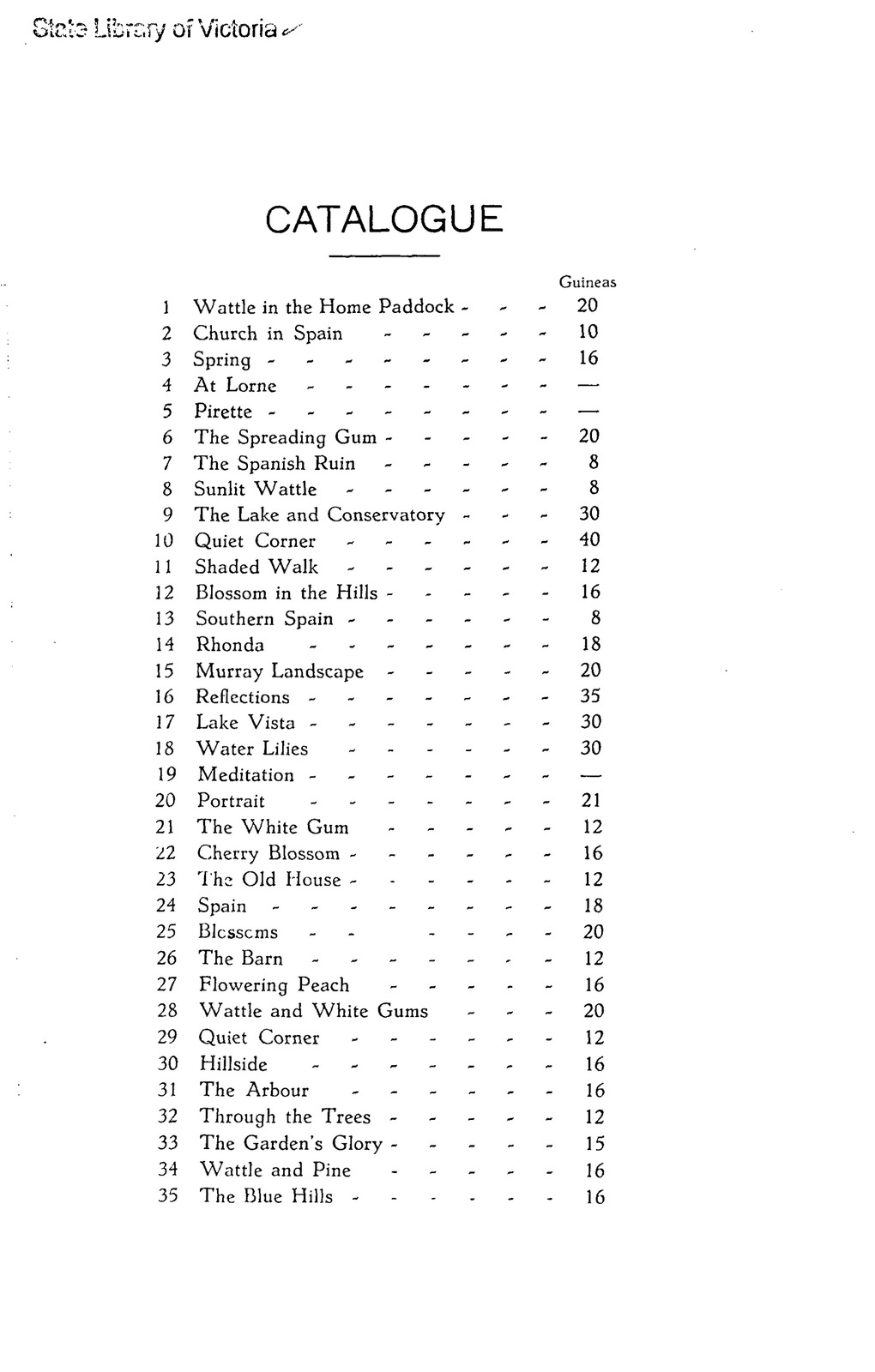
List of works in exhibition of water colours by Inez Abbott at The Sedon Galleries. Source: State Library Victoria

Inez Abbott died in Bendigo in 1957.

The Bendigo Art Gallery holds a collection of her water colours and mounted an exhibition of her work in 1983 and she was included in exhibitions of Australian artists by Greenaway Gallery, Victoria in 1997 and 1998.
