= Helen Stewart (artist) =

New Zealand born painter and printmaker (1900–1983)

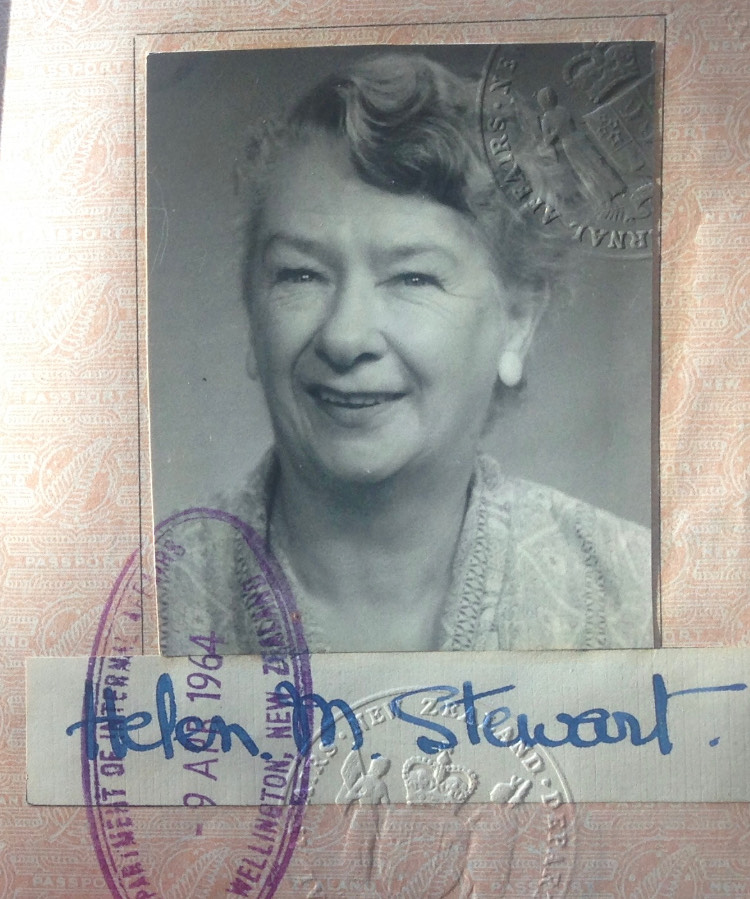
- Stewart in 1964
- Born: Helen Marie Stewart; 27 March 1900; Wellington, New Zealand
- Died: 31 March 1983 (aged 83); Lowry Bay, Wellington, New Zealand
- Known for: Painting - modernist, portraits
- Notable work: Portrait of a woman in red; Interior; Triangle and circle; and Portrait of a young man.

Helen Stewart (27 March 1900 – 31 March 1983) was a New Zealand artist.

Her work is held by collections in Australia and New Zealand, including at the Victoria University of Wellington, Dowse Art Museum, and the Museum of New Zealand Te Papa Tongarewa.

== Education ==
Stewart began studying under Linley Richardson at the Technical School in Wellington in 1921. In 1927 she had her first show and soon after left for London, where she entered the School of Art. The next year she lived in Paris and attended the Académie Colarossi and the Académie de la Grande Chaumière, though she said in 1982 they were both were studios where you "joined by the week". She moved to Sydney in 1930 to join her family who had moved from Wellington to live there, entering the Sydney Art School (also known as the Julian Ashton Art School). She said that she felt her real training started with Thea Proctor becoming an associate and also a teacher with her. In 1931 she entered the Grosvenor School under Iain MacNab. He was a modernist and she felt that she didn't gain much from this period of study.

She returned to Paris in 1932 and had a full year studying with Yadav Vytllayl and André Lhote's atelier.

== Career ==
Stewart was a modernist painter, influenced by European and British post-impressionist art, specifically Henri Matisse, Pablo Picasso, Fernand Léger, and the Camden Town artists. While at studying with André Lhote she developed an appreciation for the theory of the Golden Section, the balancing of spatial and colour relationships.

Stewart was a contemporary of Dorothy Kate Richmond, Frances Hodgkins, Madge Freeman, Elma Roach and Gwen Knight.

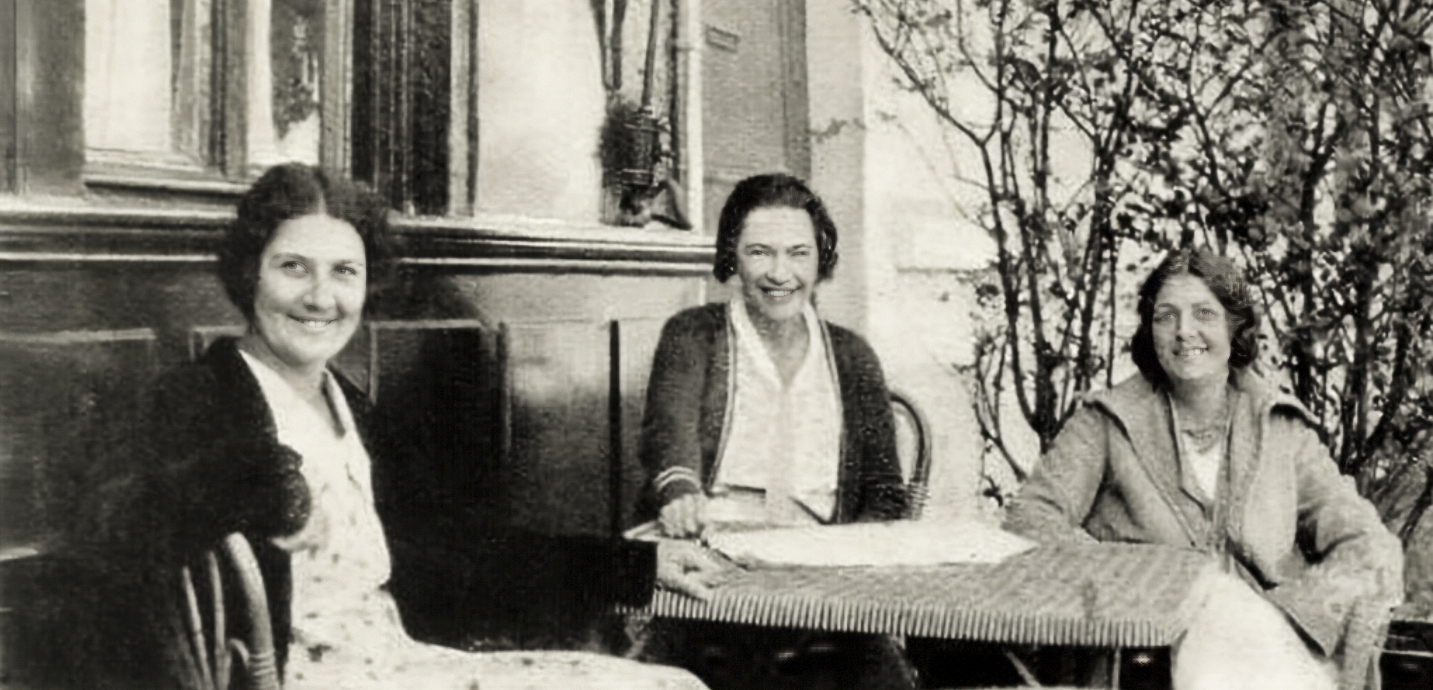
Madge Freeman, Helen Stewart, Dina Roach at Caudebec-en-Caux, Normandy, 1931

After returning to Australia in 1934, she became a member of the avant-garde Contemporary Art Society in 1935. In 1938 "150 Years of Australian Art" anniversary catalogue reproduced her painting Freesias.

In Australia she exhibited alongside Margaret Preston and Grace Cossington Smith. Although she was initially rejected by the New Zealand Academy of Fine Arts she did later exhibit with them. She also exhibited with the Christchurch based art association, 'The Group', in 1948. In 1949 she was one of the 'Group of Nine Artists' that exhibited at Helen Hitchings' Gallery in Wellington.

Stewart returned to New Zealand in 1946 and settled in Lowry Bay, Wellington. She was a founding member of the 'Thursday Group' art collective and continued to paint until her death in 1983. In 1981 she was first equal winner of the Williams Art Awards.

Notable works include: Portrait of a woman in red; Interior; Triangle and circle; and Portrait of a young man.

Stewart was included in Anne Kirker's New Zealand Women Artists: a Survey of 150 Years.
