= Adolphe Milich =

Jewish French painter and art collector

Abraham Adolphe Milich (1884, Tyszowce – 1964, Paris) was a Jewish French painter of the School of Paris, and art collector. The subject-matter of his art is the Mediterranean landscape, of Provence, Venice and Palestine, and also portraits and still life.

== Early life and training ==
Milich was born in Tyszowce, Poland, in 1884, the son of Serka (née Azenman) and Moszek Milich, and began his career as a signwriter at the age of thirteen. A fire devastated his father's shop, leading him to work as a teacher in Lodz to support his family, and in the process discovered an interest in art. He attended the school of Fine Arts in Warsaw. In 1902 Milich entered the Academy of Fine Arts in Munich where his student number was 02454. He took drawing lessons from Professor Georg von Hackl and from the painter Frantz von Stuck in 1903. During his time in Munich, he met Jules Pascin, then a draftsman for the German satyrical magazine Simplicissimus, who encouraged him to go to Paris.

== Travel in Europe ==
In 1909, Milich spent a few months in Paris, studying at the studio of Claudio Castelucho, an instructor at the Académie de la Grande Chaumière. Preferring the Old Masters, he became critical of modern painters' lack of technique. Called up in Warsaw for military service, he was discharged as too small of stature. He then traveled to Madrid in 1910, copying paintings by Velázquez and Goya for a German collector, and later went to Rome in 1911. He took up work as a society portraitist, and voiced his protest against anti-Semitic sentiments expressed at a salon. He joined the Union of Polish Painters and Sculptors.

== Paris ==
In 1915, Milich went to Lugano, Switzerland where he married Carla Fassbind in 1920, and the couple settled in Montparnasse at 4, rue Belloni (renamed Rue d'Arsonval on 8 June 1946). He taught other artists in his studio there including, in 1924, the Australians Elma Roach and Madge Freeman. He enjoyed studying works in the Louvre and spent summers in Sanary until 1927.

Milich closely associated with Pablo Picasso, Henri Matisse, Suzanne Valadon, André Derain, André Dunoyer de Segonzac, Othon Friesz, Jules Pascin, Chaim Soutine, Marc Chagall, de Waroquier, and Charles Despiau. Pierre Müller reporting in L'Ami du Peuple on Milich's exhibition at the Marcel Bernheim gallery, rue Caumartin, 10–25 May 1929, comments that "Milich's reserve as a painter is remarkable" in that it was his first show in Paris despite having lived in the city for nearly a decade, when others' more mediocre works are often;

exhibited with much publicity. Unlike most artists who seek the approval of the crowds and crave publicity, Milich finds pure satisfaction in expressing his emotions through skillful use of colours and tonal ratios on canvas. He does not conform to the taste of the day nor follow formulas dictated by art dealers and accepted by snobs. Instead, he abandons himself to inspiration under the control of a serious discipline handed down by his artistic predecessors. Milich is the most modest, at the same time the most cultured and also the most "French", of the foreigners in Paris. He knows wonders in our museums, his library is enriched every day with new books. This is probably why his painting is so familiar to us from the first glance. Who will not be seduced by the exquisite grace and distinction of his nudes? Who will not be enchanted in unraveling the mystery of his leafy parks? Who will not grasp the majesty of this portrait of a young woman?

In 1930, on the death of Jules Pascin, he was secretary of the committee created especially for this purpose of erecting a monument to Pascin. In 1931, he stayed at La Ciotat, and as an art collector, he took an interest in Degas' paintings and sculptures by Charles Despiau and Jacques Loutchansky. From 1932 the couple managed the Fassbind Hotels on Rigi-Klösterli, the Sonne, Schwert and Krone at the same time, while Carla also owned an alpine dairy, and a bakery employing over 50 individuals.

The couple collected important works including a seascape from 1869 by Johan Jongkind, two others by Eugène Boudin, an 1884 Claude Monet, a nude by Henri Matisse, a pastel by Édouard Vuillard of a woman at work, two views of the Seine by Henri Rousseau, a landscape by André Derain, an original engraving by Paul Cézanne with bathers, Siesta by Orthon Friesz, a portrait of Milich by Moïse Kisling, a watercolor by Jules Pascin, a woman in a café by Georges Rouault (1906), and busts by Charles Despiau, Marcel Gimond, Loutschansky. The collection, donated to the Villa Ciani in Lugano in 1966, also includes the 1885 Hermitage at Pontoise by Pissarro, now at the Bern Museum, a landscape by Wilhelm Gimmi, small drawings by Constantin Guys, Vincent Van Gogh, Tiepolo, Francesco Guardi, Gustav Lorain, Henri de Waroquier, as well as lesser works by Richard Kaiser, Georges Kars, Maurice Savin, Emil Orlík.

== Style ==
The journal Das Werk describes Milich's style as linked to the School of Paris,

...in particular to Cézanne and to the classicist wing of painters from the Fauve movement (Derain, Kisling). It is thus a fairly conservative painting, which has not been touched by cubism or abstraction and whose most interesting aspect is represented, in the Luganese collection, by the five watercolors which offer a kind of crystallized vision of the landscape, inspired by the last Cézanne, but softened by a more lyrical and descriptive touch.

== Recognition ==
The Musée du Jeu de Paume in Paris acquired his paintings in 1934, which were exhibited in the museum's great hall. In 1937, he participated in the International Exhibition and was awarded the bronze medal. In 1939 he held a solo exhibition at the Katia Granoff gallery, Quai de Conti, Paris which was favourably reviewed in L'Intransigeant;

it must be admitted that this artist, who treats portraits, landscapes, and still lifes with almost equal felicity, has everything to gain by providing this somewhat broad view of his work. The painting of Mr. Adolphe Milich seduces first by a simplicity which is not within the reach of the vulgar. You need very sure means to consistently obtain such firmness of construction, this plenitude of harmonies, this rare sobriety of expressing so discreetly the deep or subtle feelings inspired by beings and things. With such gifts of expression, the calm intelligence of the painter was to offer us these portraits which, something rare today, are portraits and not merely more or less advanced studies of a paying or paid model. As for the landscapes, they are almost all Venetian, and who can complain about that? The inexhaustible theme is once again renewed in canvases where we see through the eyes of the painter the Venice of summer, with its heavy and warm atmosphere, the poignant duet of sky and lagoon in plays of light which only exist at a sole point in the world.

During the German occupation, Milich lived in Switzerland from 1940 to 1942, taking refuge in Saint-Tropez and returning to Paris in 1945 after the Liberation, and living at Rue de l'Université. Becoming partially paralysed during this time, Milich learned to paint with his left hand, and from 1950, in order to be able to devote herself entirely to her husband's artistic work, Carla sold the three hotels on Rigi-Klösterli. In 1951, he visited Israel. In 1952, he was made an honorary citizen of Lugano.

He continued painting until his death in 1964.

== Legacy ==
The Milich collection in the museum of the Villa Ciani in Lugano, was inaugurated in 1966 with donations from Carla Milich-Fassbind, consisting of 27 oils, 5 watercolors and 6 drawings by Adolphe Milich, and 16 oils, 1 engraving, 4 watercolours, 8 drawings and 7 sculptures, mostly by late French masters of the 19th century and beginning of the XX. A retrospective was mounted at the Kunsthaus Schallerin 1968, and Milich works are exhibited in museums in France and abroad.
