= Bendigo School of Mines and Industries =

Coordinates: 36°45′24″S 144°17′00″E

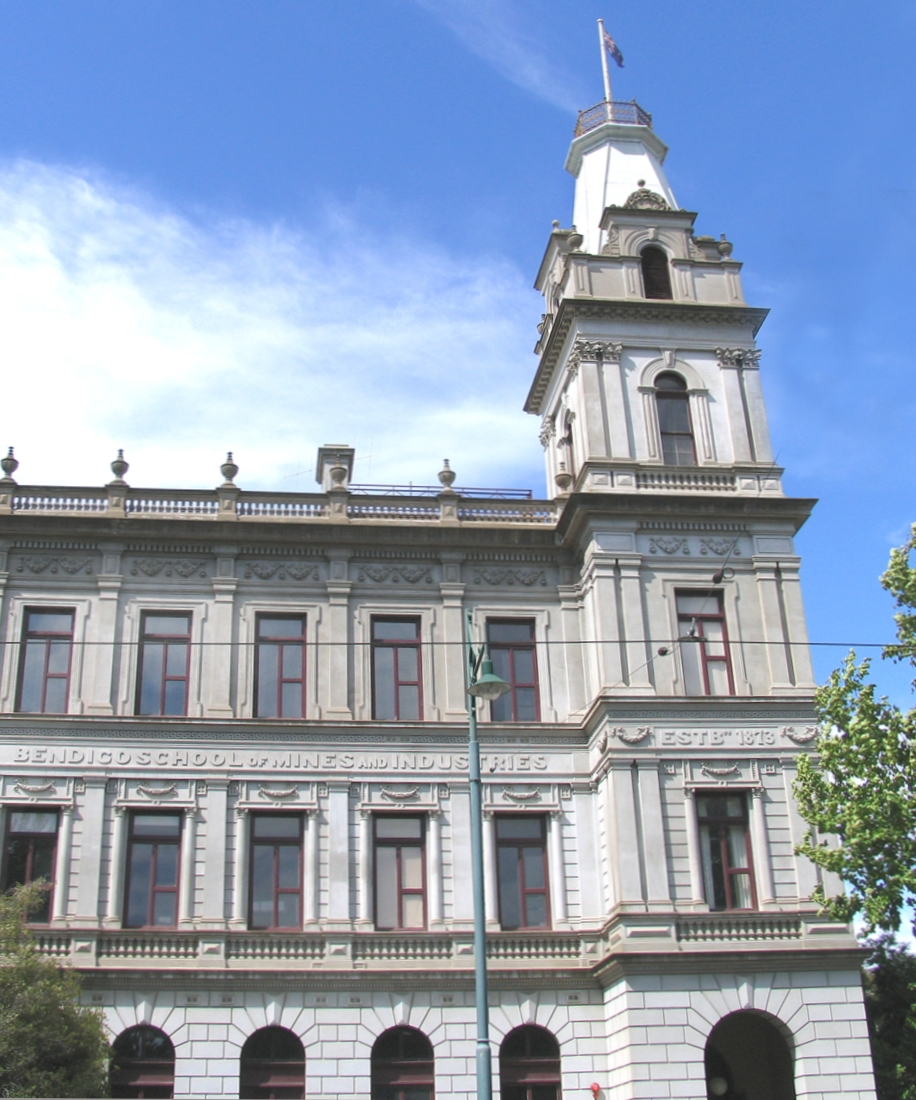
Bendigo School of Mines and Industries on McCrae Street

The Bendigo School of Mines was established in Bendigo, Australia in 1873 to provide technical education, predominantly for the mining industry.

It was then known as the Bendigo School of Mines and Industries from 1883 to 1959, Bendigo Technical College from 1959 to 1967, and Bendigo Institute of Technology from 1967 to 1975. Its changes of name reflected the broadening scope of the technical education it delivered.

A history of the organisation was published in 1973 – "Canvas to campus: a history of the Bendigo Institute of Technology", written by Frank Cusack.

In 1975 it merged with the humanities focused State College of Victoria at Bendigo (previously the Bendigo Teachers' College) to form the generalist Bendigo College of Advanced Education (1975–1990), which became the La Trobe University College of Northern Victoria on 1 January 1991. This body maintained much academic independence from the greater La Trobe University organisation until the early 2000s.

It is now La Trobe University's Bendigo Campus.

== Notable past students ==
- Inez Abbott, 1886-1957, Australian water colour artist
- Madge Freeman, 1895–1977, Australian painter of landscape and urban scenes
- Agnes Goodsir, 1864–1939, portrait painter
- Richard "Dick" Hamilton c. 1875, general manager, Great Boulder Mines
- Edward Heitmann c.1896, later Australian M.P.
- John Michael Higgins c.1882, metallurgist
- Marion Jones, 1897–1977, Australian portrait painter
- Dorothy Leviny, 1881– 1968, Australian artist
- Samuel Prior, c. 1887, later editor and owner of The Bulletin
- Louie Riggall, 1895, Australian Impressionist artist
- John Scaddan, c.1889–1895, later Premier of Western Australia
- Rose A. Walker, 1879–1942, Australian painter and miniaturist
- Christian Waller, 1894—1954, Australian printmaker, illustrator, muralist and stained-glass artist
- E. J. C. Wraith, one of Australia's earliest wireless telegraphy experimenters, 1901
