= Elma Roach =

20th-century Australian woman artist and woodworker

Elma M.V. Roach
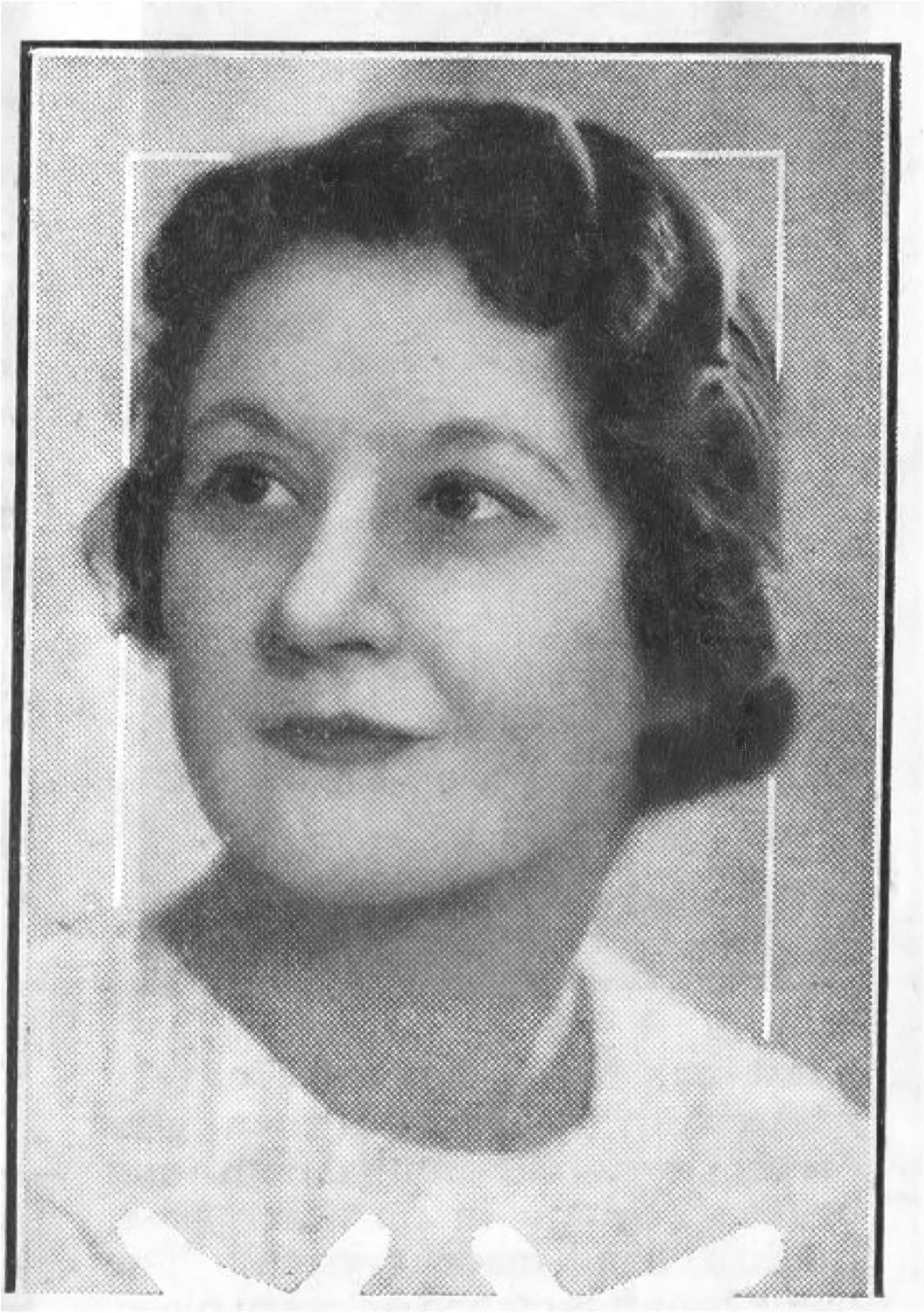
- Elma Roach in 1936
- Born: March 30, 1897; Shepparton, Victoria, Australia
- Died: June 24, 1942 (aged 45); Warrandyte, Victoria, Australia
- Resting place: Kew, Victoria
- Education: National Gallery of Victoria Art School
- Known for: painting, woodwork
- Partner: Madge Freeman
- Relatives: Wilbraham Liardet

Elma May Victoria Roach, (30 March 1897, Shepparton – 24 June 1942, Warrandyte) was an Australian modernist painter and woodworker.

== Early life ==
Elma Roach, known as 'Dinah' to her friends, was the daughter of Cora Valentine (née Liardet), daughter of Wilbraham Liardet, a colonial watercolour artist, and Charles Robert Roach. The sixth of seven siblings; Cora Harriet, Irene Selby, Hilda Elsie, Charles Edmund, Harold Edgar, and Richard Harbison, she was also a direct descendant of John Evelyn, the seventeenth-century diarist and horticulturist. Her father was stationmaster at Numurkah and reportedly much-liked, but tragically committed suicide due to insomnia in 1904, when she was seven years old.

== Training ==
Roach was living with her family at 'Sayes', Gordon Street Toorak when, from age sixteen, she studied at the Drawing School of the National Gallery of Victoria Art School from 1913 to 1916 under the guidance of Frederick McCubbin and William Beckwith McInnes. Later, she joined its School of Painting from the second term in 1916 to 1921, studying under head of the Painting School, Lindsay Bernard Hall, and where she was first noted in a December 1917 review as a still life painter in an exhibition works of students

It was during this time that she became close to fellow student Madge Freeman. In addition, she received private lessons in watercolour painting from M. J. MacNally. In 1918, she was photographed for Punch at the Students' Fancy Dress Bal Masque dressed as a 'gypsy.'

== England and Europe ==
In May 1923, Roach and Freeman organised their first joint exhibition of watercolours at the Fine Art Society's Galleries in Melbourne. In January 1924, having raised funds from their romantic Hilderesque watercolors and sold their painted and lacquered 'Madgelma' woodwork, they ventured to England, settling in the artists' hub of Chelsea. There, they briefly attended the Slade School under the tutelage of Henry Tonks. The two friends shared flats in London and Paris and embarked on painting journeys across France, Italy, Spain, and North Africa. In St Ives, Cornwall, they shared a studio with Gwen Horne.

== Influences ==
During their time in Paris, Roach and Freeman came into contact with Adolphe Milich (1884 - 1964), a French painter and teacher originally from Poland. Milich was associated with the School of Paris and specialised in oil and watercolour paintings, focusing on landscapes, still life, figure compositions, and portraits. His artistic approach, heavily influenced by Paul Cézanne, had a profound impact on Roach during the years she studied under him.

== Australian exhibitions ==
While in Europe, Roach would send her artwork back to Australia for exhibition with the Melbourne Society of Women Painters and Sculptors, The Independent Group, and various Melbourne commercial galleries.

Profiled in a magazine article in February 1927 after her return from overseas only weeks before, she is described as:

a Melbourne girl who has made herself a place in the artistic world with her craftsmanship in stained wood. Her ware is known by its beautiful glaze. Candlesticks, boxes and the like decorated with floral designs and shining like glass are among her fancies. Just a month or two ago she returned from a three years tour, chiefly on the Continent, and she has added to her repertoire designs in bas-relief and a fine French enamel finish. Though now known chiefly for her stained wood bric-a-brac, of which she is the originator here, she is also painter, and her watercolor sketches of scenes in Italy were hung at the last art show of the year at the Athenæum Gallery. While in France Elma had lessons at a famous arts and crafts school in Paris. She intends to hold an exhibition soon.

Her first solo show was at the Fine Art Society in July 1927. In a new venture the Cheyne run by Rene Monteath Roach showed enamelled wood alongside etchings by John Shirlow, paintings by Dora Wilson, and pottery of Merric Boyd. Also in 1927 she exhibited at the Lyceum Club with Clara Southern, Jessie Traill, Dora Wilson and Elsie Barlow, and in December attended the opening of John Farmer's exhibition at the Athenaeum, then leading up to Christmas that year, with her sister Winifred she exhibited what a Bulletin reporter considered 'exquisite' woodwork at the Arts and Crafts gallery. The same magazine also noted in September "fine examples of the inlaid woodwork of Elma Roach" in Margaret MacLean's studio and art salon, but in July that year had dismissed her painting as:

little above the standard of the good amateur. The lady's drawing is inclined to be woolly, and she employs the same texture for the surface of an alabaster pillar as for a fisherman's pants. Some of her efforts look as if they had been hastily blotted before they were quite dry; still, her sense of design is breezy, and her color frequently harmonious, and when she tightens up her draughtsmanship matters should improve.

Roach announced in April 1928 that she was planning another trip to Europe in April, and held a farwell opening of a show of water-color sketches and decorated woodware including panels for overmantels at Cheyne Gallery, 175 Collins Street, during the week alongside her sister's work. By September, it was reported that she and Lillian White were painting in a fishing village in Brittany. They made rendezvous with Australian artist colleagues Norah Gurdon, Dora Wilson and Pegg Clarke, and later Madge Freeman and Margaret MacLean, in London where Roach was undertaking further study, and where her work had been accepted into the British Academy and the Women's International Art Club. She sent work to Australia for showing in May 1930 in the Victorian Artists Society, where her watercolour, Fading Light was judged as "freshly and cleanly painted" by Melvyn Skipper of The Bulletin. She had other work exhibited at the Paris Salon, and at a reception of the National Council of Women attended by 2,500, a watercolour by Roach was presented.

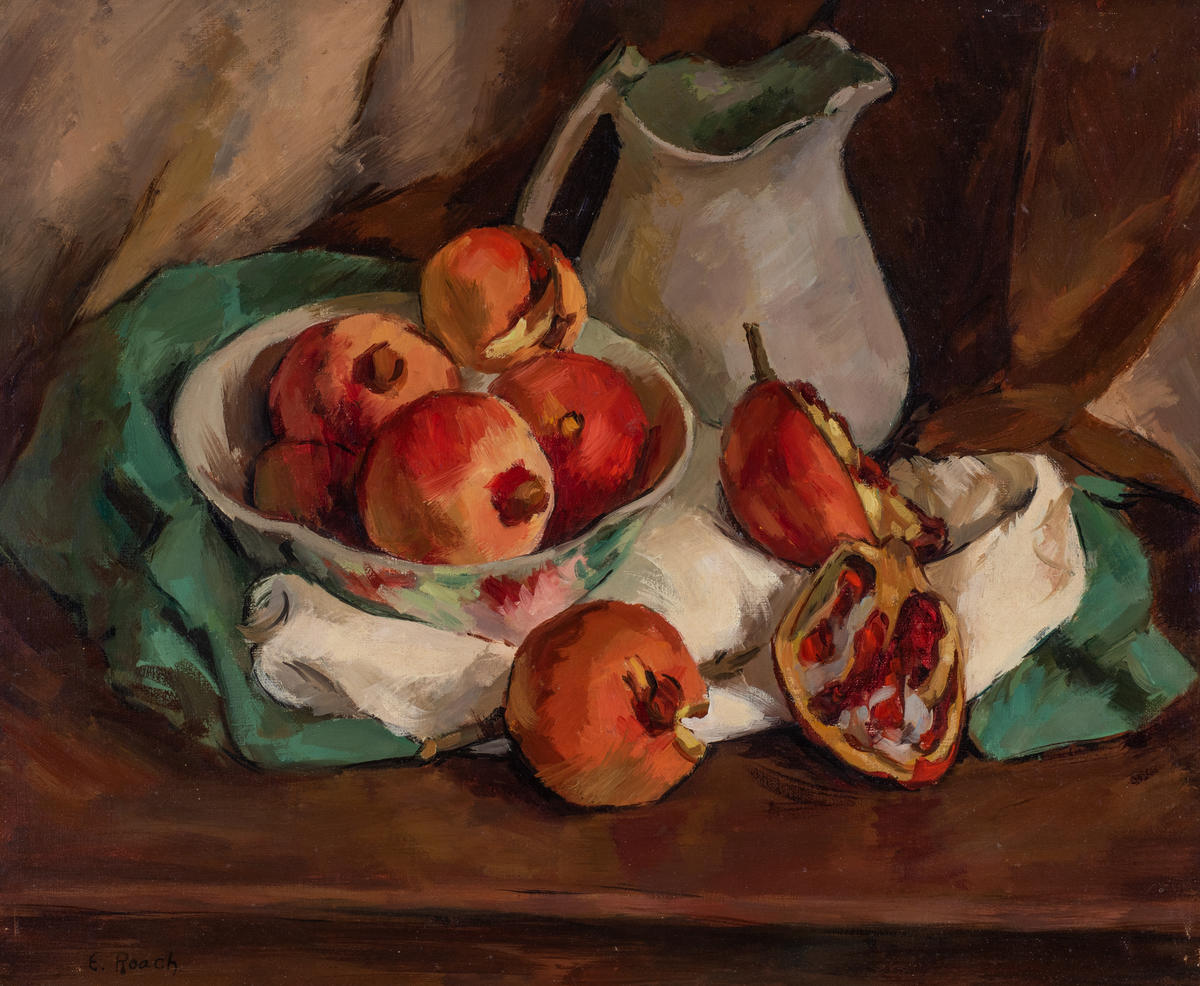
Elma Roach (c.1935) Still Life with Pomegranates. Castlemaine Art Museum

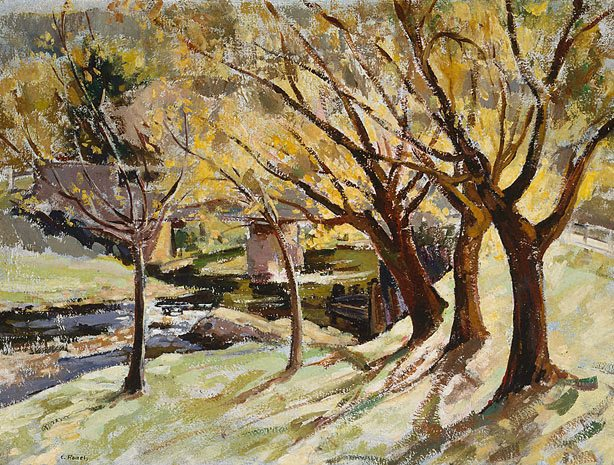
Elma Roach (c.1941) Autumn. Art Gallery of New South Wales

Roach returned to Melbourne in January 1936 on the Moldavia, and with Freeman exhibited their dress clips, brooches and other ornaments first at Roach's studio, 117 Collins Street, then at Freeman's “converted stable” at 144 Gipps Street, East Melbourne. In 1938 she was represent in the first exhibition of the Australian Academy of Art in 1938 with her oil painting, priced at 10 guineas, Street, East Melbourne depicting Freeman's aforementioned studio. Both were featured in Art in Australia, with mention in an accompanying statement; "Then there are painters like Madge Freeman and Elma Roach, who have brought back with them from Paris still another aspect of contemporary European painting unfamiliar to Australian eyes." Another, a still life in a Cézannesque manner, had earlier appeared in the May edition of Art in Australia with work by other Australian Academy of Art artists. As Burdett noted, her work was representative of a French influence, and was more at home in George Bell's Contemporary Art Society which countered the Academy's conservatism. She exhibited there in June 1939 with Madge Freeman, Betty Kopsen, Sybil Craig and Anne Montgomery, and while a handful of the works were considered 'interesting experiments' by The Bulletin, some by others were ridiculed as "the work of bad-mannered little schoolboys."

Not long before she died, Roach was included in group exhibitions in 1941 and 1942 at The Macquarie Galleries in Sydney. The former, generally excoriated as "an average display of contemporary academic painting which, like all work done to popular formulae, is dull as ditchwater" by The Bulletin, only Roach's "attempt at the golds and browns of autumn (a more understandable Gallery buy)" and a Thea Proctor nude were considered 'original statements;' her work Autumn was purchased by the Art Gallery of New South Wales.

== Legacy ==
Elma Roach died in Warrandyte on 24 June 1942 at the age of 45. She is buried in a family plot with her parents and sisters Ethel and Flora in Boroondara General Cemetery in Kew, Melbourne. She was remembered in an obituary as;

one of the old school of Victorian painters. She was a National Gallery product who developed into a peripatetic painter. She went for her subject matter all over Europe, visited India and had only recently returned from a caravan tour in the Walhalla (Vic.) district. She exhibited in the various Paris salons and was bought by most of the important Australian galleries.

The same issue of the magazine noted that;

Elma Roach (Dina [sic] to her friends), of pleasant memory, passed over last week. Her work as an artist showed vitality and her ideas on art were acceptable sometimes in the realms of commerce. She and Madge Freeman went abroad together and lived at art centres of the Old World for years. Miss Roach had many side interests; she did clever felt work on silk, and one of her best-worked waistcoats is in the possession of Esther Paterson, a fellow-artist.

Several of her works, and a portrait of her by Dora Wilson which "captures Miss Roach's smile, and is a fascinating study in greens and browns," were on display at an Independent Group exhibition at the Athenaeum Gallery in Melbourne in September 1942. A memorial solo exhibition of forty-three works was held 9–20 March 1943 from which three of her pieces, including two oil paintings and one watercolour, were acquired by the Castlemaine Art Museum. Despite the purchases made on the advice of Daryl Lindsay, James MacDonald, critic for The Age, ignored the memorial status of the show and delivered a withering review, writing that "these studies have a general monotony, owing to the absence from all of them of any personal conviction," and finding their "certain Cezanney cast...derivative and imitative." By contrast, Harold Herbert in the Argus wrote that Roach was "an excellent and versatile painter...Her work was always simple and seen in a big way. She knew how to wield a full brush in water colour, and never failed to achieve a successful result."

Roach quite quickly fell into obscurity; though her works are in public collections at the Art Gallery of New South Wales, Queensland Art Gallery, and Broken Hill Art Gallery, the highest price paid for a work by Roach was $5,155 for Zinneas in October 2021 at Leonard Joel auction house, Melbourne. By 1952, Hal Missingham, Director of the Art Gallery of New South Wales, in preparing a new catalogue had to issue a call in major newspapers for information on 'Five Artists Unknown' in which Roach was included with Dora Wilson, Jan Hendrik Scheltema, Cesare Vagarini and H. Stuart Wilson.

== Works by Elma Roach ==
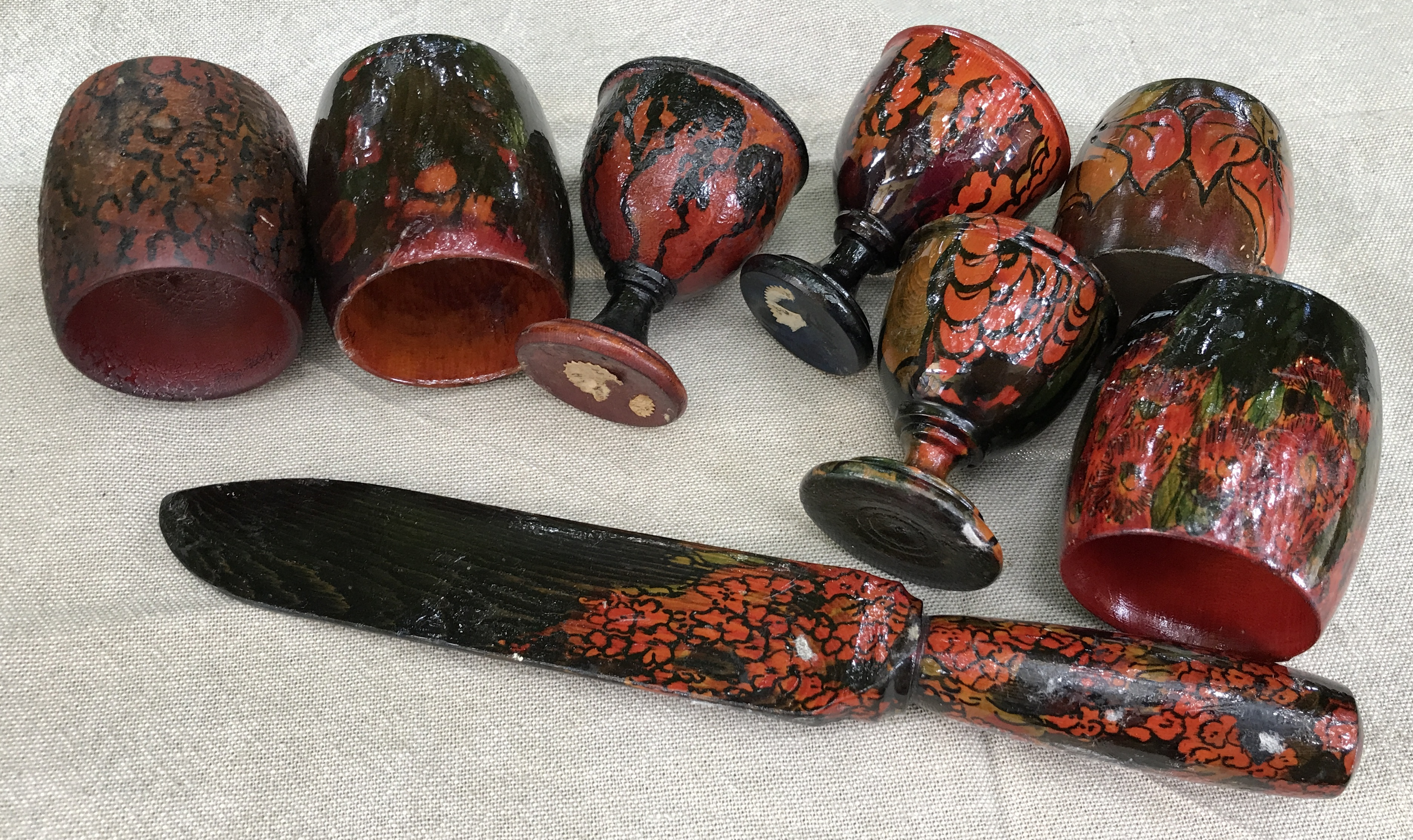
Examples of tableware created by Elma Roach. Decorated wooden egg cups, napkin rings, and a letter opener.

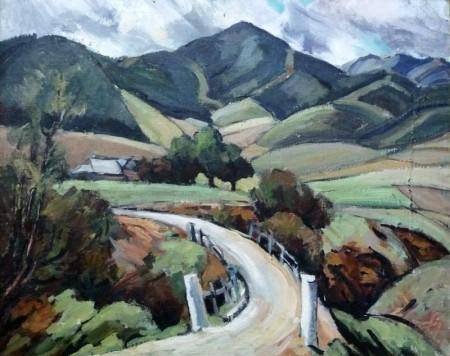
Elma Roach (c.1931) Valley Road

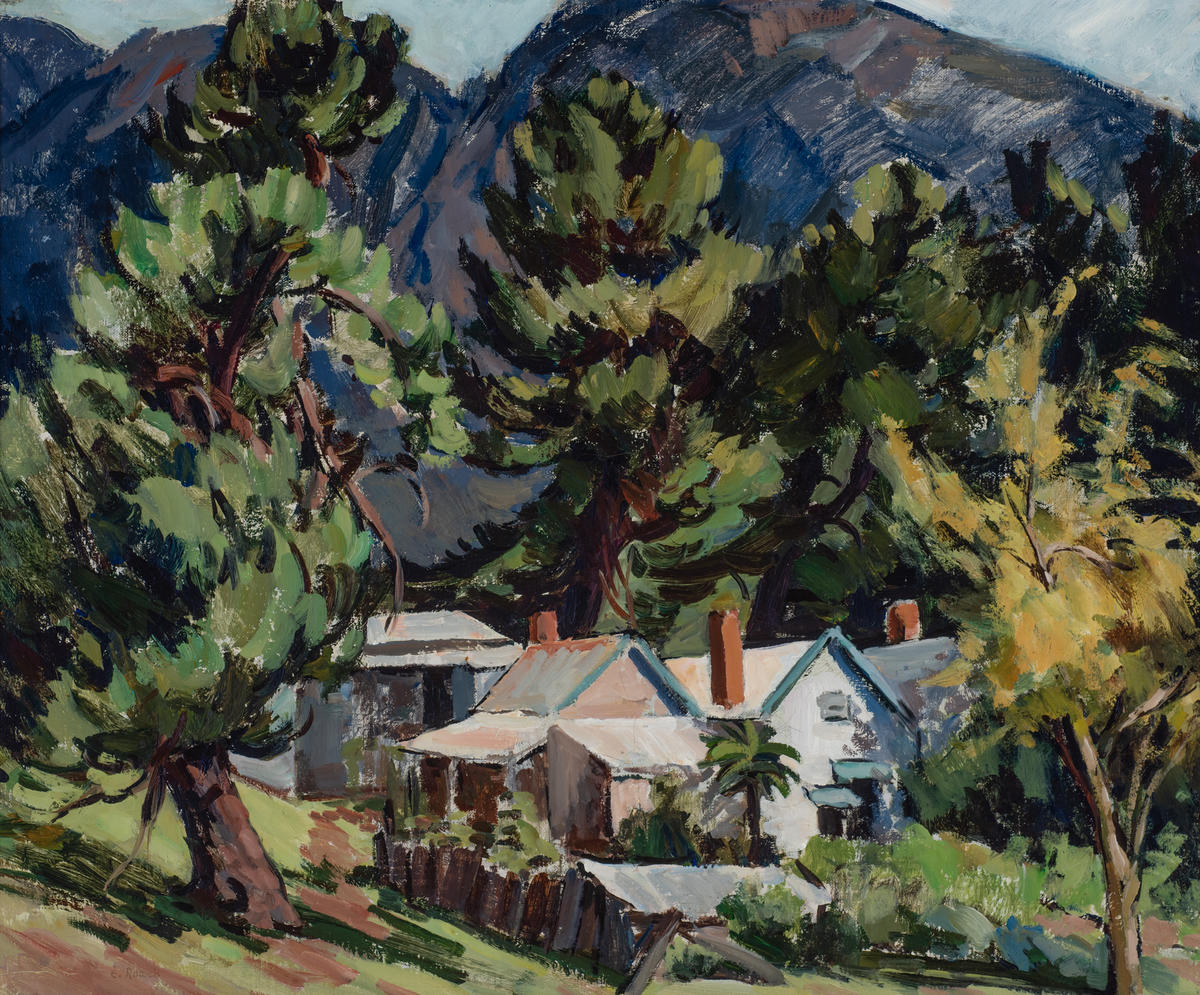
Elma Roach (c.1931) Farmhouse near Bright

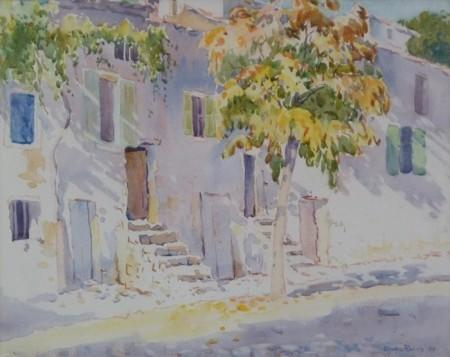
Elma Roach (1928) October Morning, Sospel, France. Watercolour

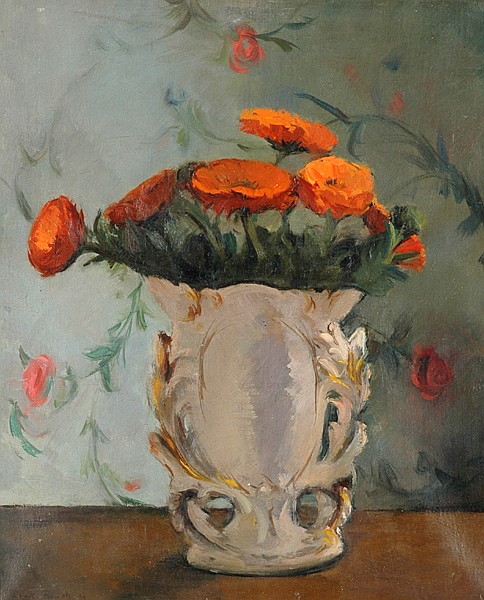
Elma Roach (1934) Still Life with Marigolds

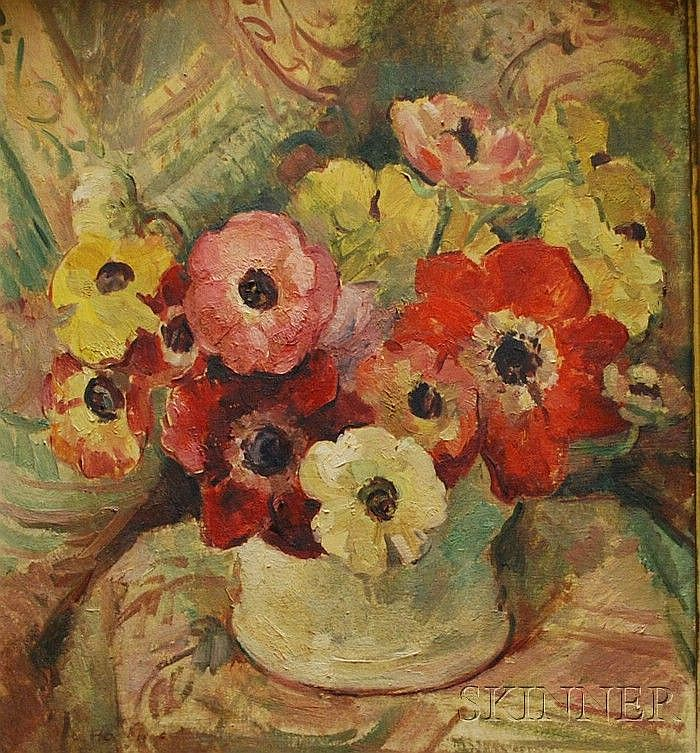
Elma Roach (c.1930s) Still Life with Anemones

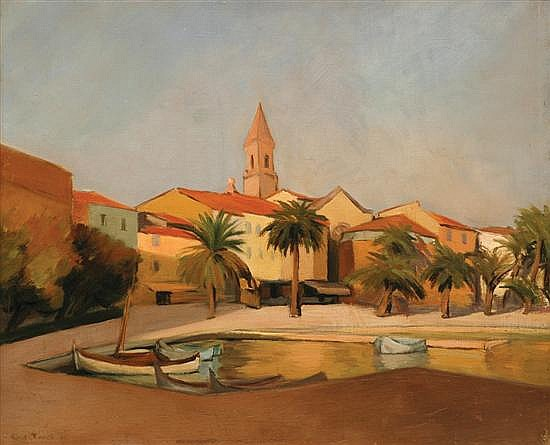
Elma Roach (1934) Sanary, South of France. oil on canvas

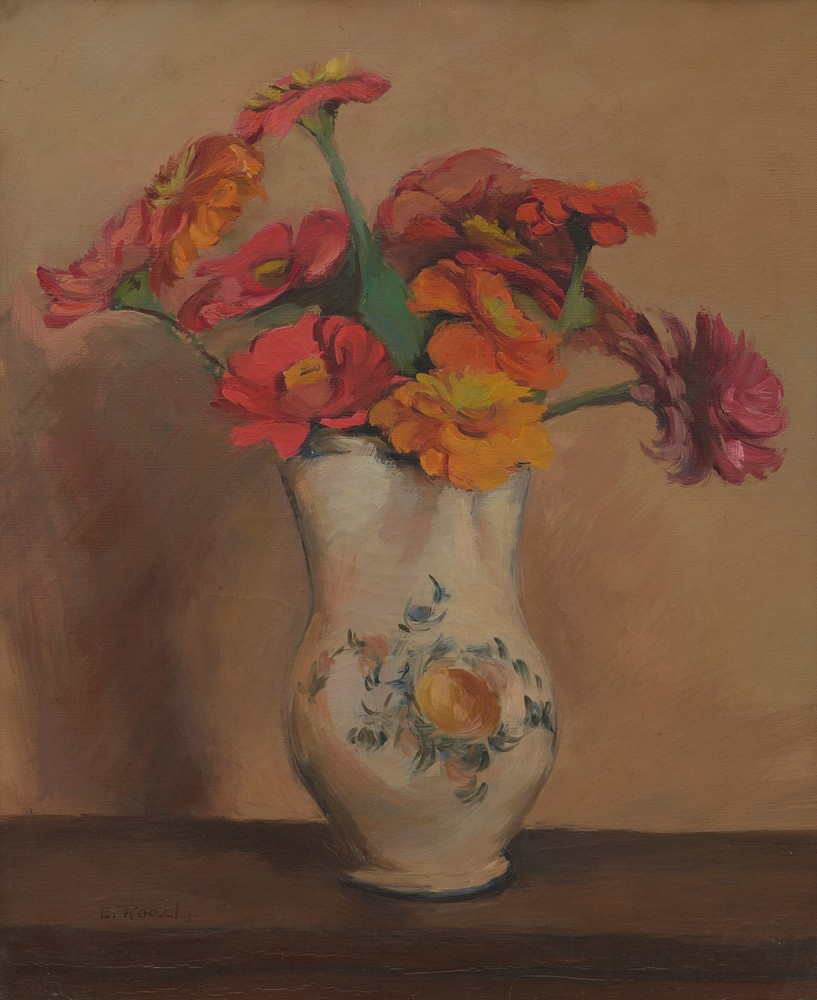
Elma Roach (n.d.) Zinneas Oil on canvas

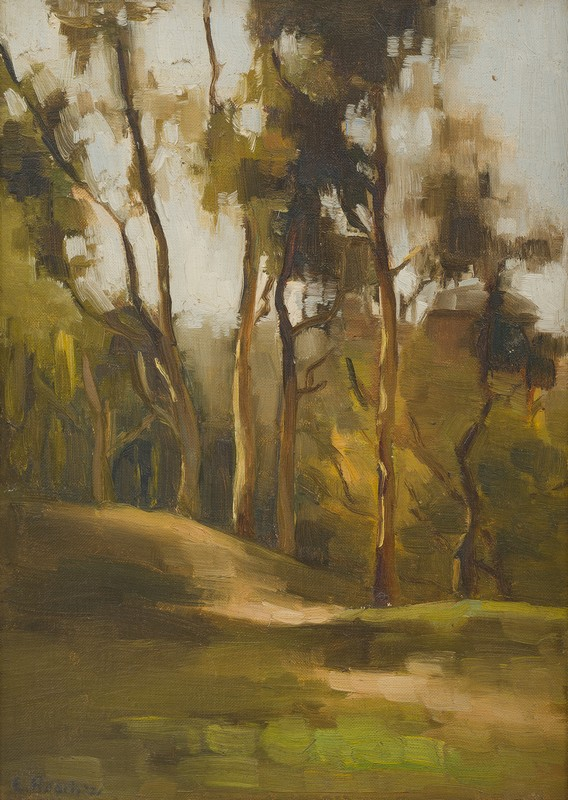
Elma Roach (1921) Gum Trees

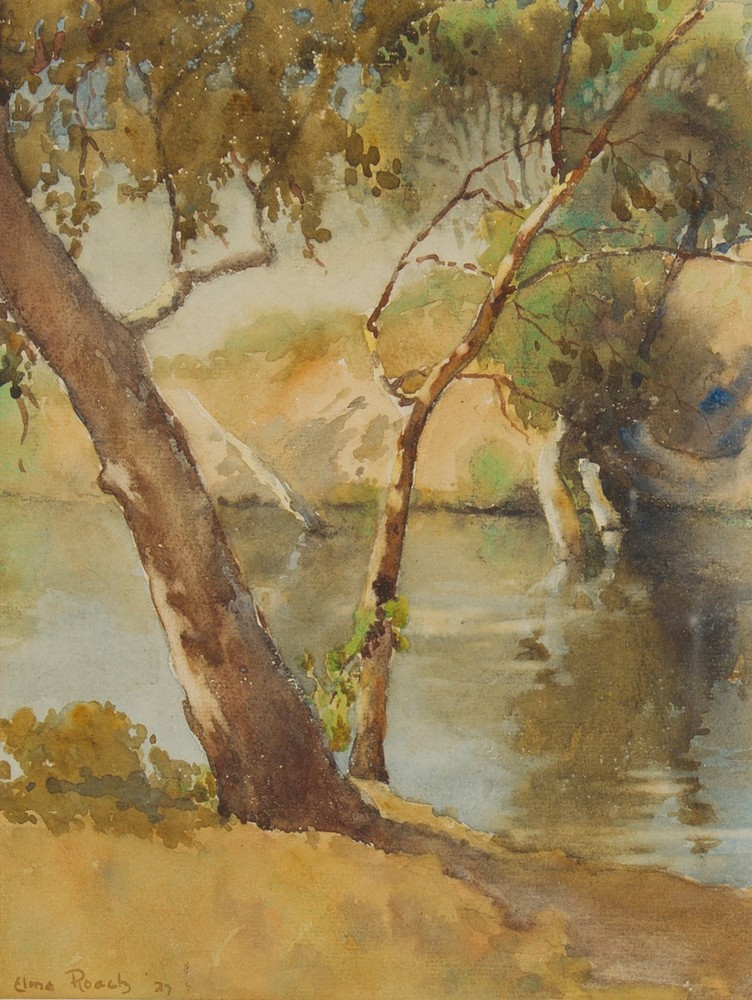
Elma Roach (1927) Still Day at Erskine River, Lorne

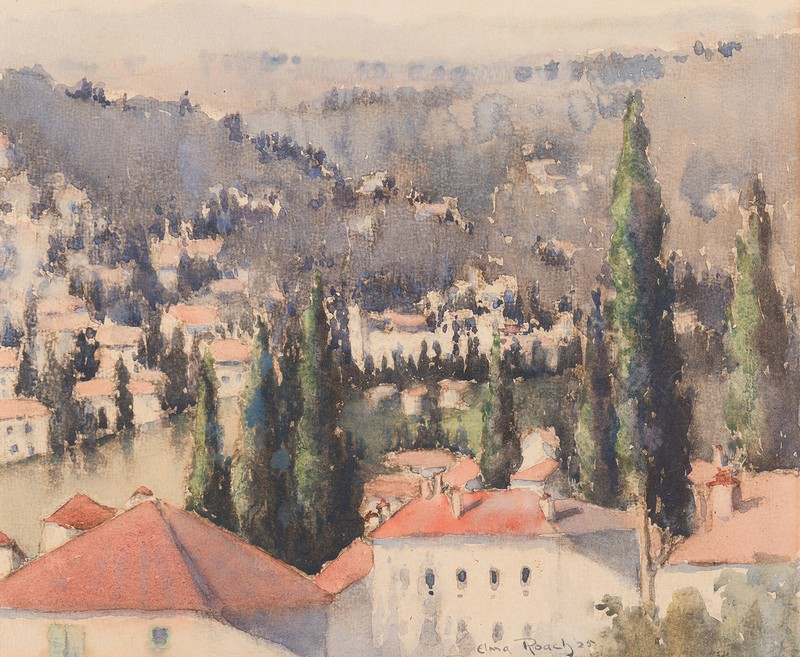
Elma Roach (1925) View Over the Arno, Florence. Watercolour

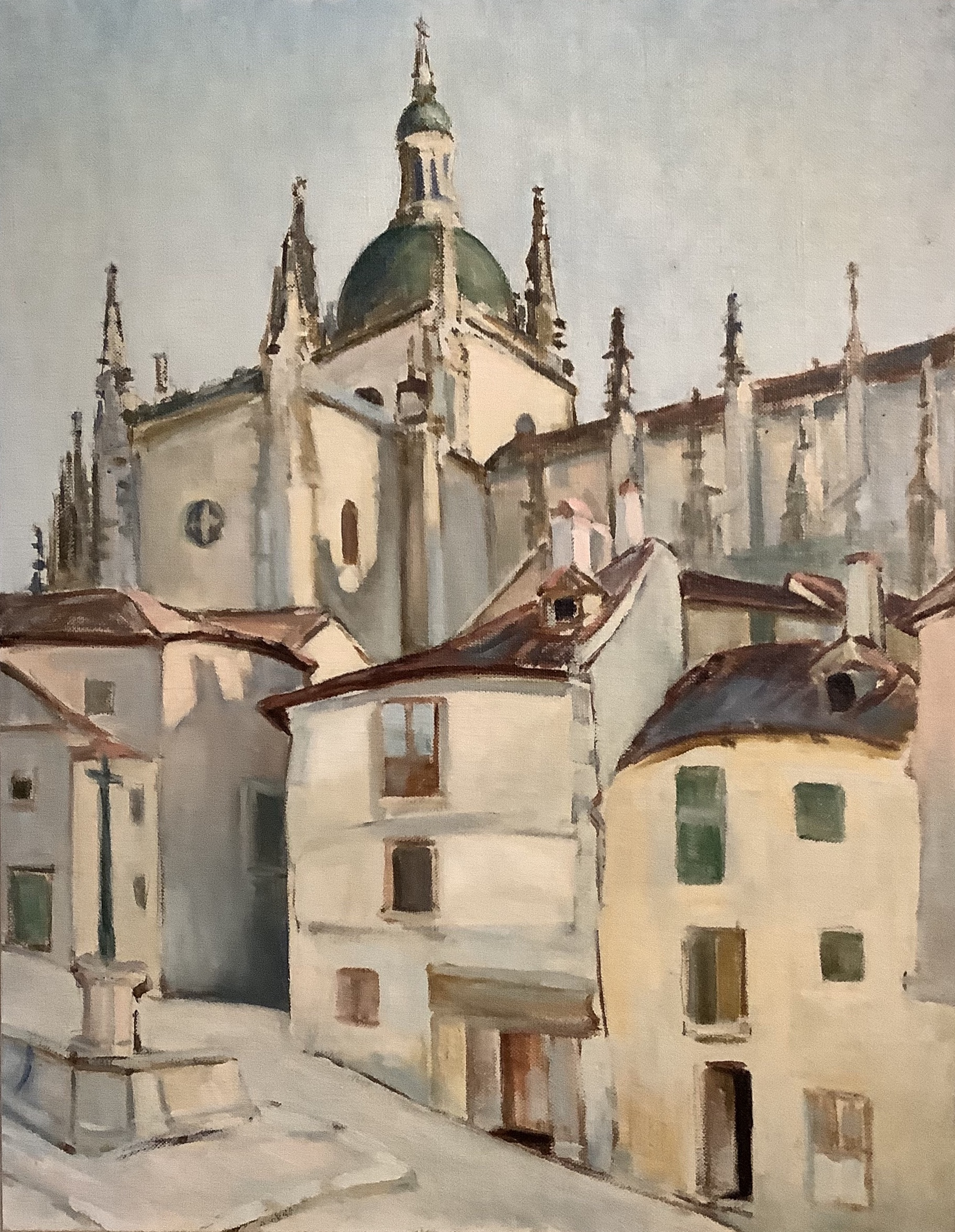
Elma Roach Untitled European town, in family collection. Oil on canvas
