= Louie B. Riggall =

Australian artist (1868–1918)

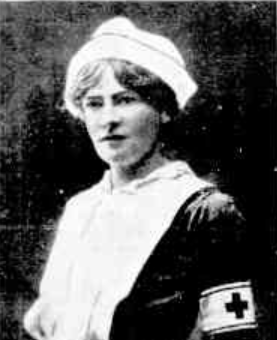
- Born: Louisa Blanche Riggall; 2 March 1868; Maldon, Victoria, Australia
- Died: 31 August 1918 (aged 50); Rouen, Upper Normandy, France
- Resting place: St. Sever Cemetery, Rouen - Officers, B. 3. 1.
- Education: Bendigo School of Mines and Industries

Louisa Blanche "Louie" Riggall (2 March 1868 – 31 August 1918) was an Australian artist and Red Cross volunteer during World War I.

== Early life ==
Louie B. Riggall was born in Maldon, Victoria, the sixth of nine children born to Edward Sheens Riggall and Martha Riggall (née Gregory). The family moved first to Glenmaggie in the Gippsland region before purchasing the Byron Lodge estate at Tinamba. Concerned for her health and determined she should have an occupation, her father enrolled her in art lessons after seeing how she would traipse around their property with her paint box. She began her art education under Arthur Woodward at the Sale School of Art and later followed him to the Bendigo School of Mines.

Her first time exhibiting was at an amateur art exhibition in association with the Bendigo Art Gallery at the Australian Natives Association (ANA) building. She won first prize in Landscapes in oils, and third prize for Still Life. She participated again the following year where she won three prizes for drawing.

== Paris ==
After more than two years being taught by Woodward she had learned all she could and asked her parents if she could go to Paris. It was only after being refused by every English art master she wrote to and six months of indecision by her father that they consented. Her aunt accompanied her to Europe so she could commence further art education in Paris. While there she studied at Académie Delécluse and had to learn to speak French. Her work won first mention in several categories and had the distinction of being hung in the Paris Salon. She was taught by Garrido (probably Louis-Edouard Garrido), Ertz, and sculptor Carrier-Belleuse.

== Return to Australia ==
When Riggall returned to Australia she had a solo exhibition at the Austral Chambers, Collins Street showing works from her travels. She shared a studio there with a fellow Australian who had studied in Paris, Florence Fuller. They had a joint exhibition there in 1902 which received favourable reviews. Riggall also enjoyed success with the Victorian Artists Society, further solo exhibitions in 1903 and 1906, and the Federal Art Exhibition in South Australia in 1907.

Riggall was associated with the Woombalano Art Club with fellow Victorian female artists Amalie Colquhoun, Henrietta Maria Gulliver, Cristina Asquith Baker, and Janie Wilkinson Whyte.They exhibited at Stalbridge Chambers, and Tuckett and Styles Gallery, both in Melbourne. She joined the Melbourne Society of Women Painters and Sculptors in 1907, being a regular member of the exhibition hanging committee.

Her contribution of leatherwork and a beaten copper box for the First Australian Exhibition of Women's Work in 1907 was the first evidence of her interest in the Arts and Crafts movement. In her diary from her Italian tour in 1905 she states "In all these old cathedral though one is struck by the loving care put into the work - how they must have loved doing it all!" She exhibited further leatherwork with the Arts and Crafts Society of Victoria in 1909.

In 1913 she purchased property The Crescent at Glenmaggie, near her family.

== World War I ==
Despite not being a trained nurse, Riggall paid her own way to sail to Egypt to work for the Voluntary Aid Detachment (V.A.D.) of the Australian Red Cross. Archdeacon Pelletier who shared passage with her on The Moldavia quoted her as saying "I could not stop in Australia while the need for women at the front is so urgent. I am not a trained nurse but I am willing and ready to serve in any capacity– in a kitchen or peeling potatoes, so long as I am helping the boys."

After nine months in Egypt she travelled to France with the No. 1 Australian General Hospital to Rouen. She was far from the only female artist from Victoria to serve, with Jessie Traill also attached to two hospitals in Rouen, and Norah Gurdon in Le Croisic. Riggall visited twelve hospitals in addition to the one she was in charge of at Rouen, organised entertainment for the convalescents and purchased presents for them to send home. Her craftiness came in handy with furnishing the Red Cross Hall, and making curtains for the Sisters' rooms.

Riggall died in August 1918 of a cerebral hemorrhage while still stationed in Rouen. She bequeathed £500 to help incapacitated soldiers in Gippsland. Louie was described by Jessie Traill: "The soul and life of work here in Rouen, as an organiser and untiring worker, enthusiastic, sympathetic. She was always cheerful and kind, and a great inspiration."

== Legacy ==
A stained glass window donated by her family to St John's Church Maffra has an inscription below it in her memory. There is a memorial plaque dedicated to her at Maffra Library. Her name is on the Commemorative Roll at the Australian War Memorial, and on the Nurses Honour Roll at St Paul's Cathedral, Melbourne.

She has just two paintings in public collections– the Latrobe Regional Gallery, and the Castlemaine Art Museum.
