= M. J. MacNally =

Australian watercolour artist

Matthew James MacNally (1873–1943) was a well known Australian watercolourist during the first half of the twentieth century. Since his death there have been two major exhibitions of his work, one at John Martin's Art Gallery in Adelaide (1946) and a retrospective at the Benalla Art Gallery (1974).
