= Girton Grammar School =

Location
- 22 Vine Street; Bendigo, Victoria, 3550; Australia; 36°45′45″S 144°16′23″E

Information
- Type: Co-educational, private, day school
- Motto: Per Aspera Ad Astra
- Denomination: Non-denominational
- Established: 1992
- Founders: John Higgs, Jan Thomas, Chris Morey, Clayton Jones, Robyn MacCulloch
- Sister school: Gojo Senior High School, Nara, Japan; Collège & Lycée Sainte Ursule, Luçon, France
- Principal: Emma O'Rielly
- Chaplain: Karen Reid
- Grades: Prep – Year 12
- Enrolment: 1,200
- Houses: Milward, Aherne, Frew, Jenkin, Jones, Riley
- Colours: Maroon and gold
- Slogan: Per aspera ad astra ("Through hardship to the stars")
- VCE average: 34
- Yearbook: The Girtonian
- School fees: $16,000
- Website: girton.vic.edu.au

Girton Grammar School is an Australian private co-educational school from Prep to Year 12 located in Bendigo, Victoria.

== History ==
Girton Grammar School was founded in late 1992 after the closure that year of Girton College, a school owned and operated by the Anglican Diocese of Bendigo which was no longer able to fund it. Following the closure of the college, some people associated with it founded Girton Grammar School as an independent private school. The school opened in early 1993 under the direction of founding headmaster Clayton Jones.

== Organisation ==
Girton Grammar School has a junior school (Prep to Grade 6) campus located at 105 MacKenzie Street, Bendigo, and a senior school campus (Year 7 to 12) located at 22 Vine Street.

== Academic results ==
In 2016, 20.1% of Girton Grammar School students achieved a VCE score of 40 or above. The median ATAR score in 2016 was 83, with 26% of Year 12 VCE students ranking within the top 10% of the state, 15% in the top 5%, and 4% in the top 1%.

The school achieved a median ATAR score of 81 in 2015, with 32% of students ranking within the top 10% of the state and 19% within the top 5%.

Girton Grammar School has produced two Rhodes Scholars, Rebecca Duke (2017) and Connor Rochford (2017).

== House system ==
There are six houses at the school. These are named after important figures in the history of both Girton Grammar School and the former Girton College.

(In order of creation)

- Frew (red)
- Riley (blue)
- Aherne (green)
- Millward (purple)
- Jenkin (orange)
- Jones (white)

== Notable alumni ==
- Annika Smethurst – journalist
- Shelley Chaplin – silver, bronze paralympic medalist, wheelchair basketball player
- Caitlin Thwaites – Commonwealth Games gold medalist, netball player
- Ola Cohn - Sculptor, author and philanthropist.
