= Agnes Goodsir =

Australian artist (1864–1939)

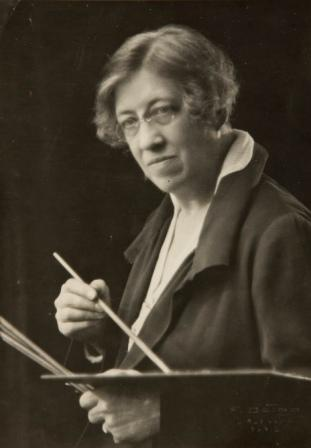
- Born: 18 June 1864; Portland, Victoria
- Died: 11 August 1939; Paris, France
- Education: Bendigo School of Mines and Industries (1898-1899); Académie Delécluse, Paris, France (1899)
- Known for: portrait painting

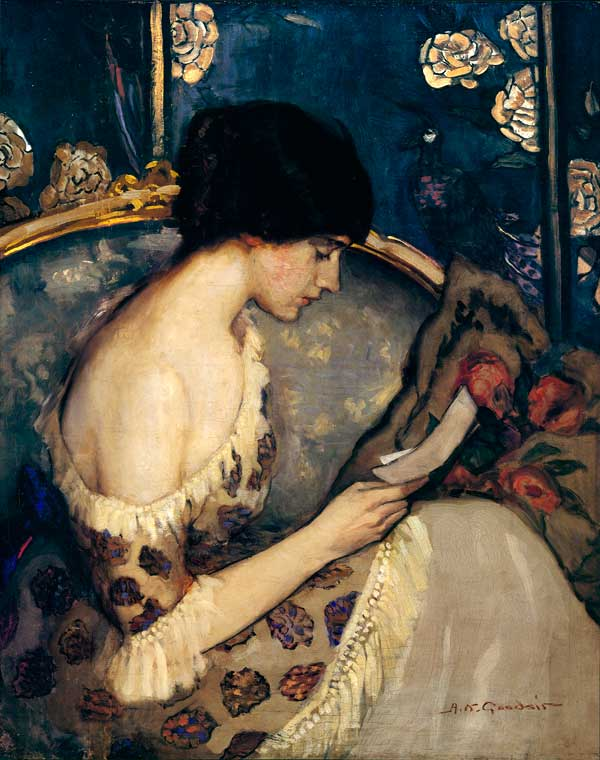
A letter from the Front/Girl on couch (1915)

Agnes Noyes Goodsir (18 June 1864 – 11 August 1939) was an Australian portrait painter who lived in Paris in the 1920s and 1930s.

== Biography ==
Goodsir was born in Portland, Victoria, Australia, one of eleven children born to David James Cook Goodsir, Commissioner of Customs at Melbourne, and Elizabeth Archer (née Tomlins).

Her early art training started with Arthur T. Woodward at the Bendigo School of Mines and Industries from 1898 to 1899, and in 1899 some of her work was raffled in Bendigo to partly finance her study in Paris. The years following World War I saw a virtual exodus of Australian artists on a sort of Grand Tour to Paris, all intent on being part of the explosion of the arts taking place there. Painters like Rupert Bunny, Stella Bowen and Max Meldrum were drawn there by the appeal of the Left Bank. Others like Margaret Preston and Grace Crowley were inspired to develop in new directions by post-war Parisian art.

Goodsir attended the Académie Delécluse, the Académie Julian (under Jean-Paul Laurens) and then the Académie Colarossi. From about 1912 she shuttled between London and Paris, but finally settled in Paris in 1921 at 18 rue de l'Odéon.

During her time in Paris Goodsir painted portraits of cosmopolitan women including her partner, Rachel Dunne, nicknamed Cherry. The Parisienne, a portrait of Cherry was painted around 1924.

Her work was acclaimed and exhibited at the New Salon, the Salon des Indépendants, and the Société Nationale des Beaux-Arts in Paris as well as at the Royal Academy and the Royal Institute in London.

On a short visit to Australia in 1927, she exhibited at the Macquarie Galleries in Sydney and the Fine Arts Gallery in Melbourne. In 1938, four of her oils were shown at the sesquicentennial exhibition at the Art Gallery of New South Wales.

She was a member of the Societe Nationale des Beaux-Arts.

Goodsir died in Paris, France in 1939.

Goodsir's work showed strong composition and technique, favouring oils over watercolours. Despite turning out a large number of still lifes and interiors, her forté was portraits, including Katharine Goodson, Leo Tolstoy, Ellen Terry, Banjo Paterson, Bertrand Russell, Dame Eadith Walker, Countess Pinci and Italian leader Benito Mussolini.

Goodsir's work featured among that of 50 women in a 2025 exhibition co-presented by Agsa and the Art Gallery of New South Wales (AGNSW) and entitled 'Dangerously Modern Australian Women Artists in Europe 1890-1940'.

== Collections ==
Works are held in:

- Art Gallery of New South Wales - Chinese skirt
- Art Gallery of Western Australia - White Lilac
- Bendigo Art Gallery
- National Gallery of Australia - In a Latin Quarter studio and The Parisienne.
- National Gallery of Victoria - The letter, (Woman reading)
- State Library of New South Wales - A. B. Paterson, Banjo

== Legacy ==
The Goodsir Scholarship awarded by the Bendigo Art Gallery is named in memory of her.

In 1978 a street in the Canberra suburb of Chisholm was named Goodsir Place in her honour.

== Gallery ==
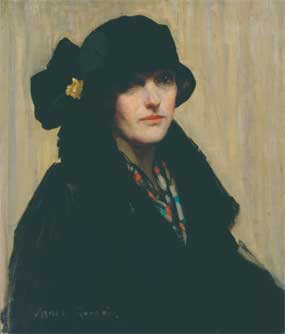
self portrait (circa 1910)

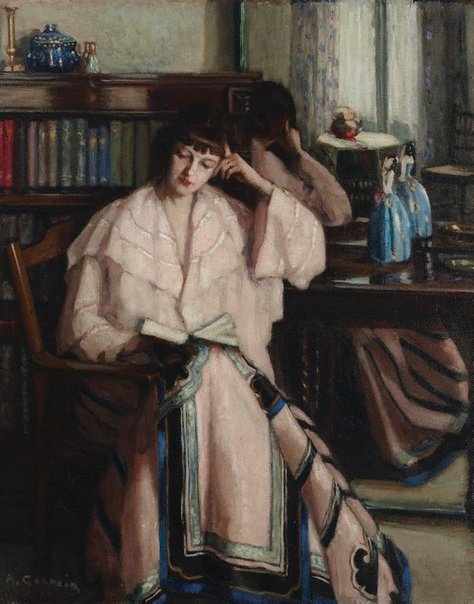
Woman reading (circa 1910)

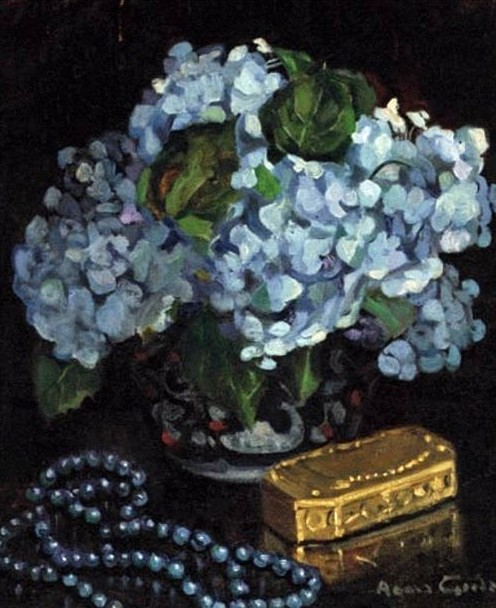
Hydrangeas

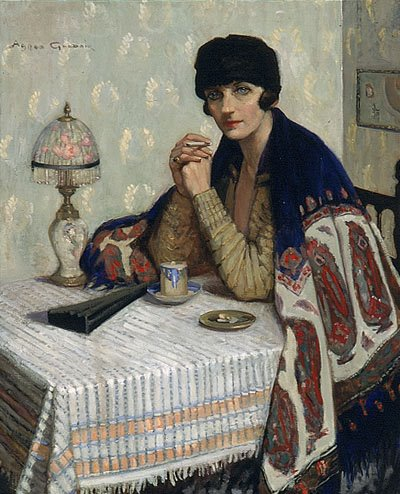
Girl with Cigarette (1925)

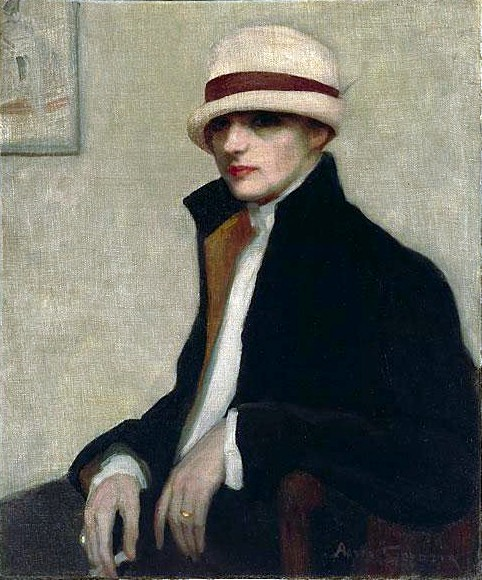
The Parisienne (circa 1924)

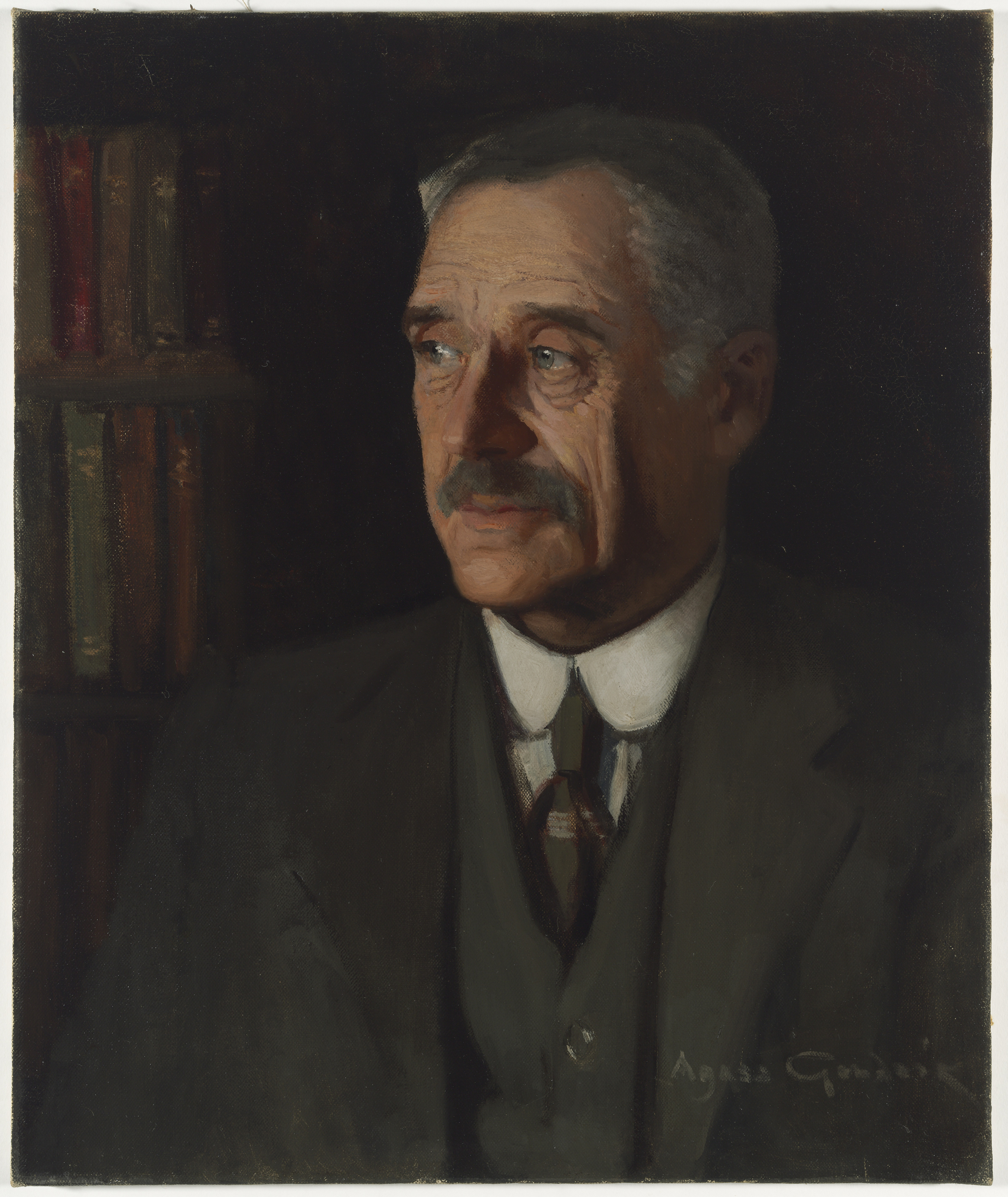
Andrew Barton "Banjo" Paterson, 1927
