= Dora Wilson =

British-born Australian artist (1883–1946)

Dora Lynnell Wilson
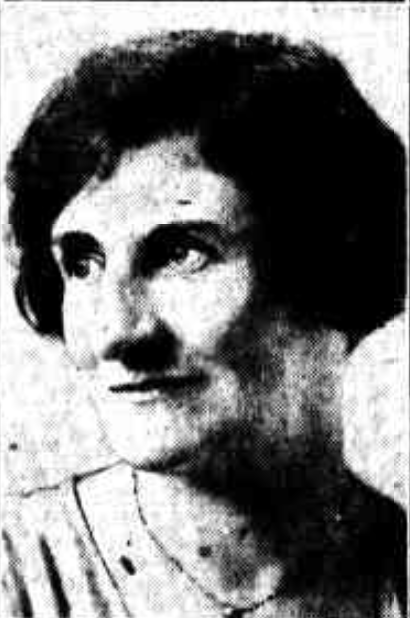
- Dora Lynnell Wilson (1883-1946) British-born Australian artist c.1926
- Born: Dora Lynnell Wilson; 31 August 1883; Newcastle upon Tyne, England
- Died: 21 November 1946 (aged 63); Melbourne, Victoria, Australia
- Occupation: Artist

Dora Lynnell Wilson (31 August 1883 – 21 November 1946) was a British-born Australian artist, best known in her adopted country of Australia for her etchings and street scenes.

== Early life ==
Dora Lynnell Wilson was born on 31 August 1883 in Newcastle upon Tyne, England. Her parents were James Wilson, agent, and Annie Maria, née Green. The family emigrated to the state of Victoria in Australia in 1884, when Dora was a year old.

== Education ==
Wilson was educated at Somerset School and Methodist Ladies' College in Melbourne. From 1901–1906 she studied at the National Gallery under Bernard Hall and Frederick McCubbin, forming friendships with fellow artists Ruth Hollick, Gwendolyn Grant, Norah Gurdon, and her partner Pegg Clarke. She also took lessons from John Mather with Jessie Traill and Janie Wilkinson Whyte.

== Artistic career ==
Wilson was best known for her etchings, pastels and oils of still lifes and nudes. Her work was praised for her 'strong sense of colour' but also critiqued for demonstrating a 'chocolate box prettiness'. Her work was included in a number of notable exhibitions, including the five week Australian Exhibition of Women's Work in Melbourne, a Royal Academy exhibition of Australian art in London. In 1923 her work, 'Reve d'Or', was reproduced on the cover of Women's World and exhibited at the Société des Artistes Français in Paris.

Her studio at Collins Street West was the meeting place of ex–Gallery School students who exhibited in 1913–14 as 'The Twelve Melbourne Painters.' This group included Jessie Traill, Janet Cumbrae Stewart, Norah Gurdon, Penleigh Boyd, and Lindsay Bernard Hall. Wilson was also a member of the Melbourne Society of Women Painters and Sculptors.

From the 1920s onwards she concentrated largely on street scenes, and in 1923 she was commissioned by Sir Baldwin Spencer to undertake a series of paintings of European landmarks, which saw her travelling around Europe for over two years, accompanied by the photographer Pegg Clarke. In 1928 these works were exhibited at the Beaux Arts Gallery, London, and the following year at Australia House. In the early 1930s she focused on historical scenes from Melbourne's history, with an exhibition entitled 'Milestones of Melbourne' held at the Fine Art Society Gallery in March 1935. Her work was received favorably by Arthur Streeton for being "fresh in colour and treatment and free from the depressing appearance of black paint." In 1937 she joined and exhibited with Robert Menzies' Australian Academy of Art.

Dora L Wilson, Pictures Collection, State Library Victoria

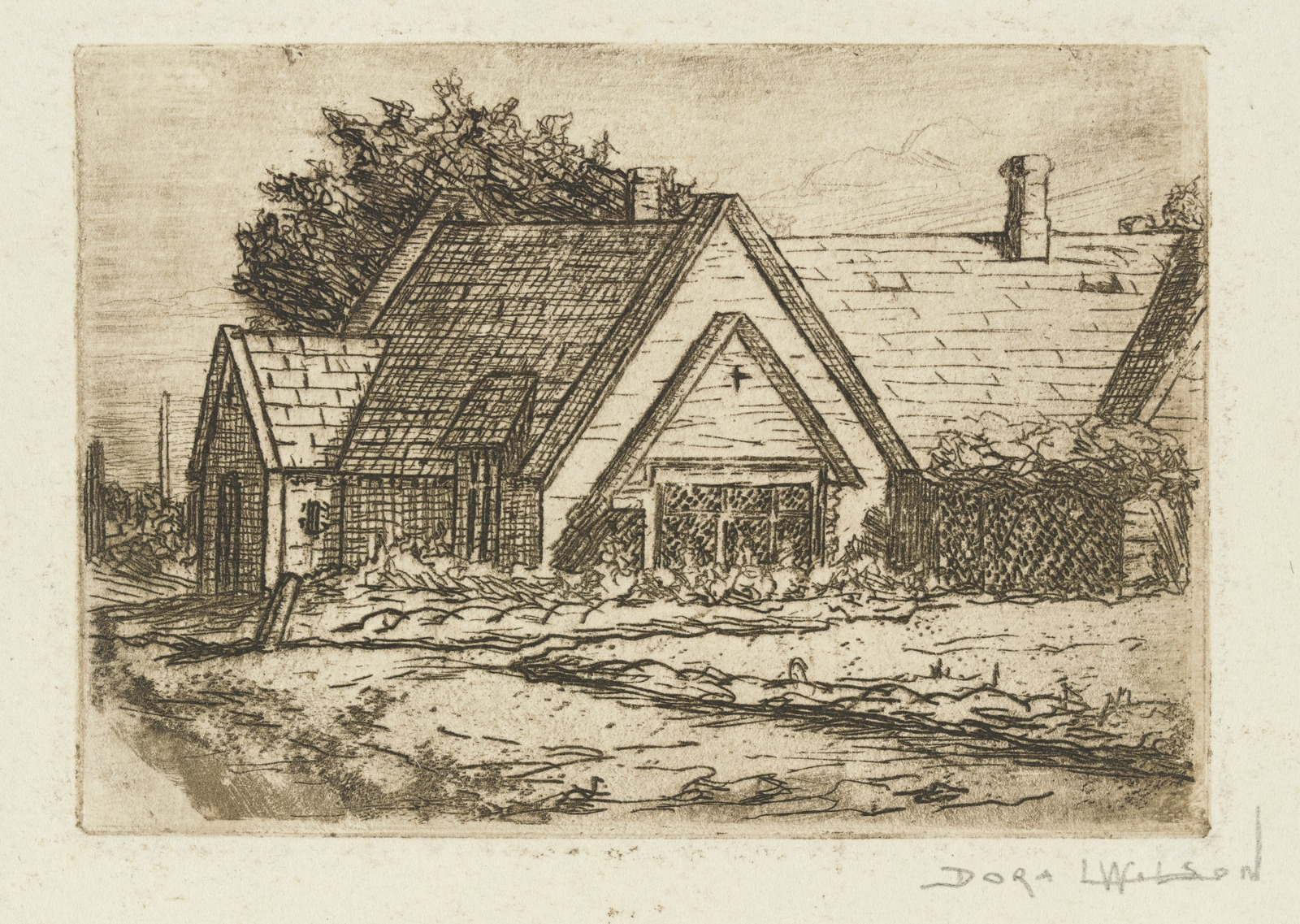
Exterior view of single story house with steep gabled roof, [between 1900 and 1910]

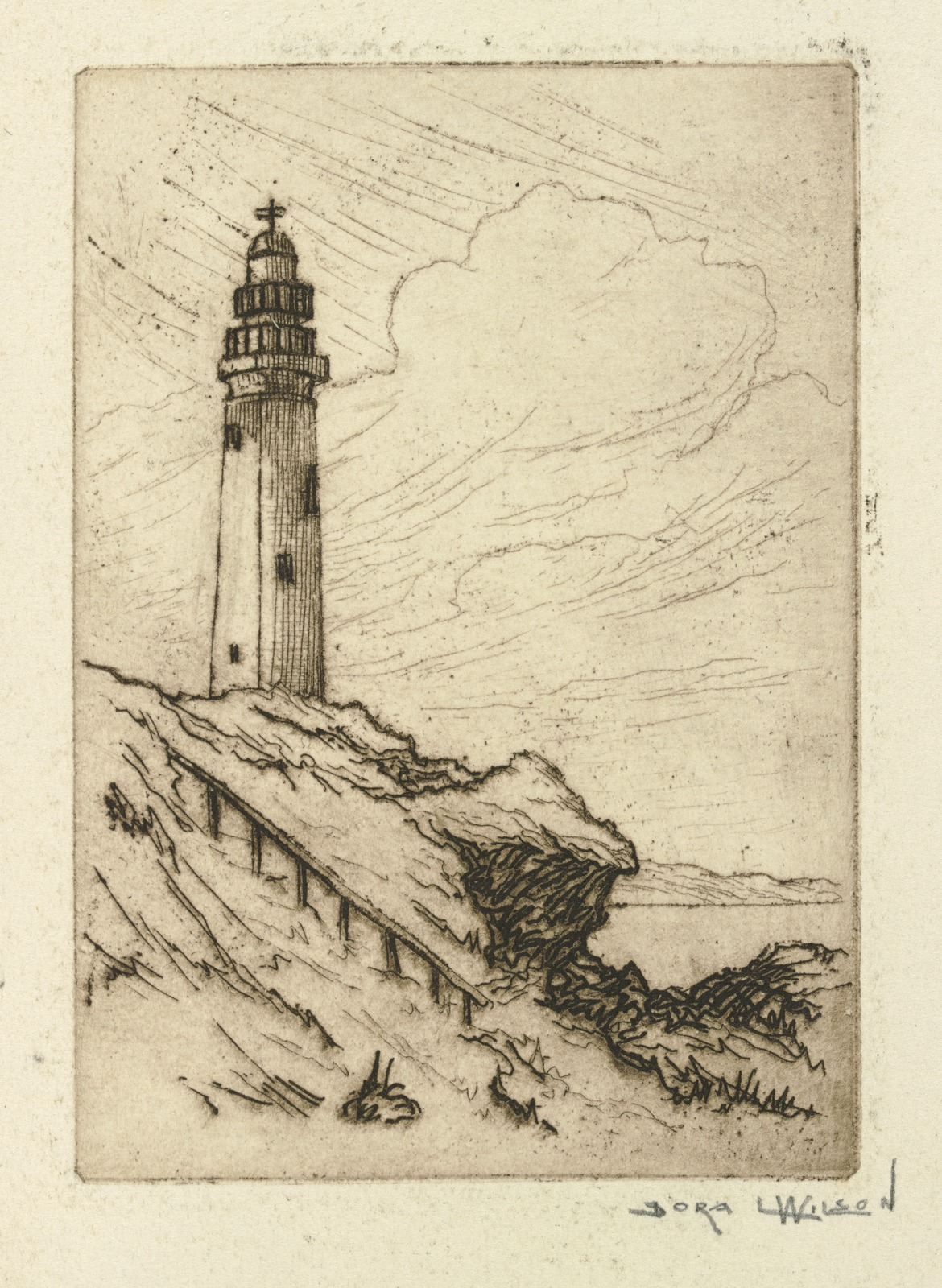
Unidentified light house on a cliff, [between 1900 and 1910]

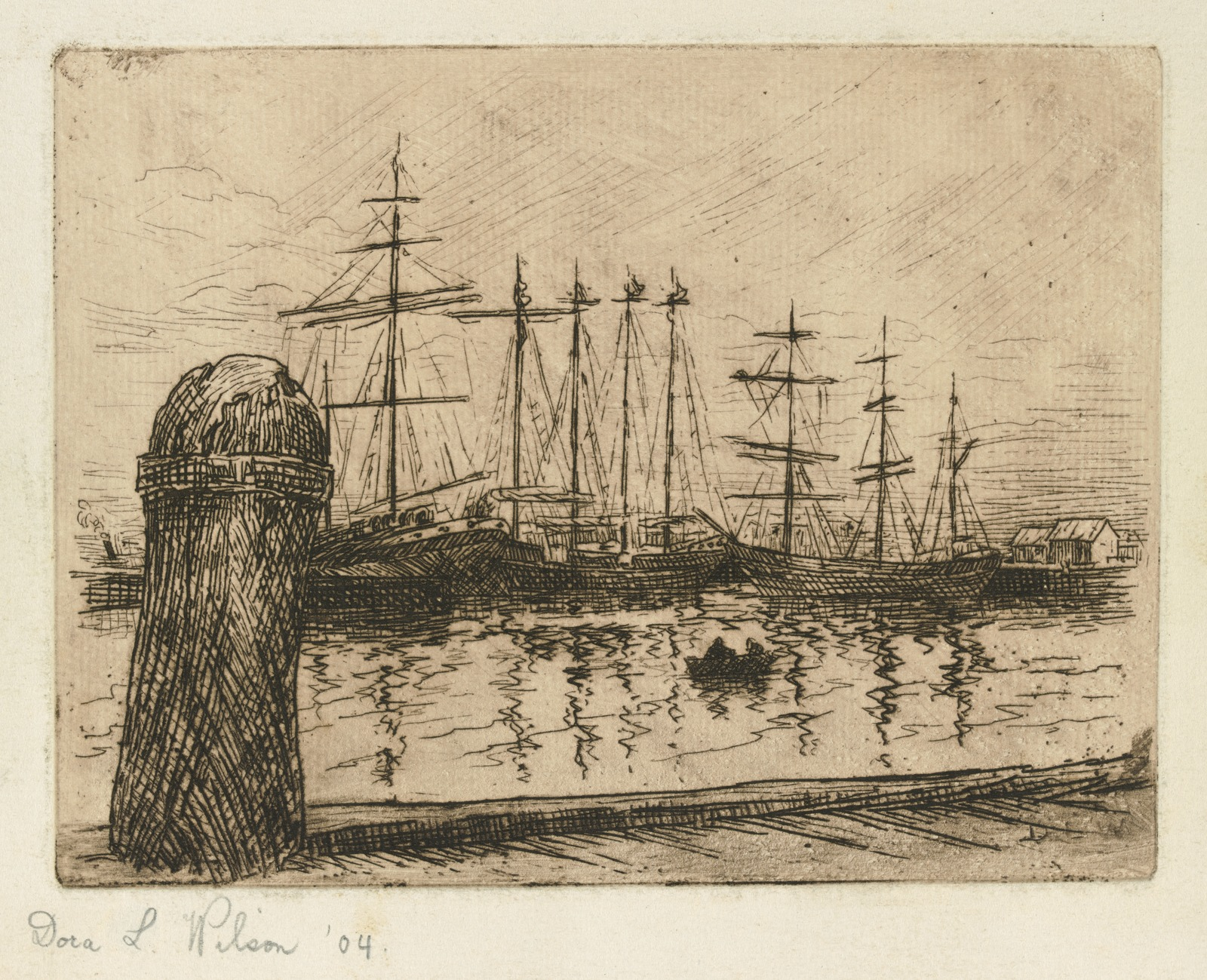
Ships at anchor, [between 1900 and 1910]

== Death ==
Wilson died of cancer on 21 November 1946 and was cremated at Springvale Cemetery, Melbourne. She made a bequest to the National Gallery trustees in the amount of £1100 as it was her wish to help Australian artists to travel abroad.

== Exhibitions ==
- 1943, from 1 December; Inclusion in a group show of ninety-one paintings and etchings with Arnold Shore, Max Meldrum, John Rowell, Jas. Quinn, John Farmer, Mary Hurry, Dora Serle, Margaret Pestell, Allan Jordan, Isabel Tweddle, Aileen Dent, Murray Griffin, Geo. Colville, and Victor Cog. Hawthorn Library.
