= Pegg Clarke =

Australian photographer (c.1884–1959)

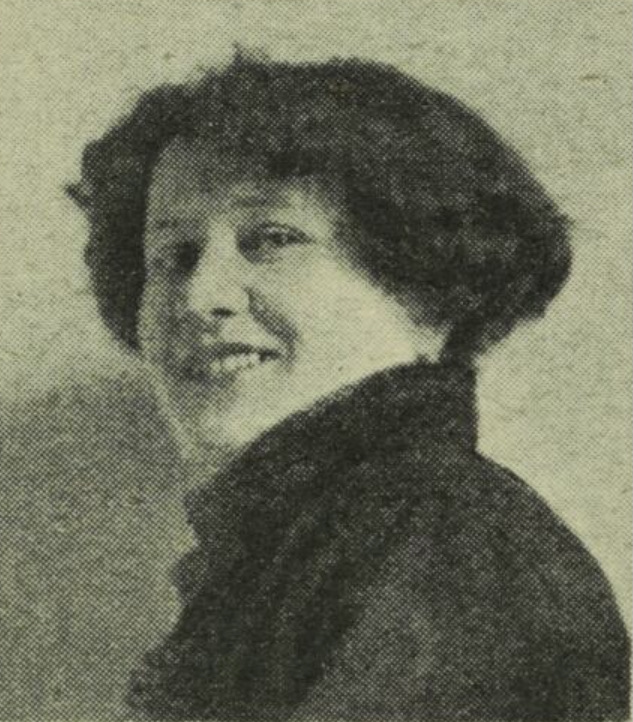
- Clarke in 1925
- Born: Margaret Clarke c. 1884; Victoria, Australia
- Died: 6 June 1959; Melbourne, Australia
- Occupations: Photographer and Author
- Known for: Pictorialism, architectural, magazine and portrait photography

Pegg Clarke (c. 1884–1959) was an Australian professional fashion, portrait, architectural and society photographer whose work, published frequently in magazines, was referred to by historian Jack Cato as being of "the highest standard."

== Biography ==
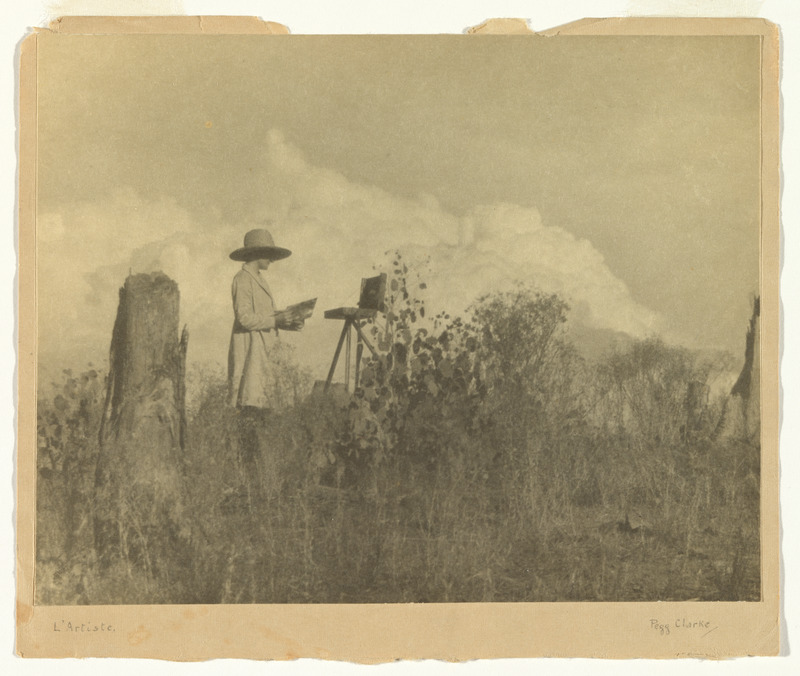
Pegg Clarke (c.1920s) L'Artiste; portrait of Dora Wilson.

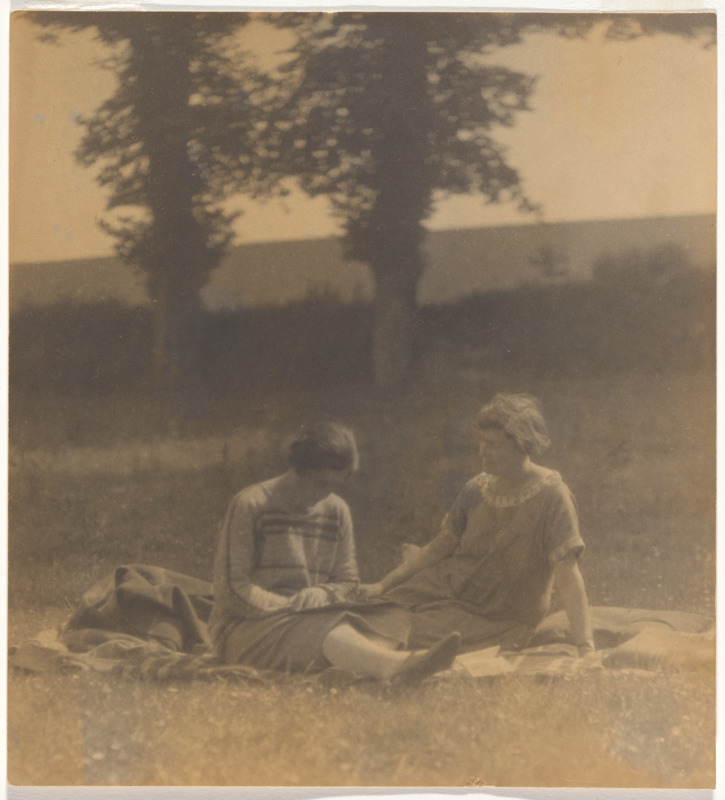
Pegg Clarke (1920s) Untitled (two women seated on the grass)

Little is known of Pegg Clarke's early years, place or exact date of birth, or of what attracted her to photography. Joan Kerr has her death only as an estimate; "between 1956 and 1958," but her probate documents and death certificate show 6 June 1959 and age 75. A 2009 exhibition sets her birth at 1883. Pegg Clarke claimed to be some seven years younger than Dora L Wilson, her lifelong companion, who was born in 1883 but an outward shipping register 23 August 1929 has Clarke aged 45 and Wilson 44. Dr. Jim Mitchell, archivist of Scotch College has proposed that she was related to Olive Clarke, secretary to Dr Colin Gilray, the college principal, from 1934 to 1953.

== Career ==
Clarke had an early win with a picture Minnie in the October 1915 Australasian photo-review Home Portraiture Competition.

Rosebank from which she was operating before 1923 was row of terraces in Hawthorn that took its name from a 19th-century estate from which their land was subdivided. Registered in the 1924 electoral rolls as 'photographer', her work featured in prominent early 20th century Australian magazines, at first in thumbnail portraits for The Bulletin. While the Australian quarterly The Home launched by Ure Smith in 1920, nominated Harold Cazneaux (1878–1953) as their "Special Photographer", Pegg Clarke, probably 8 to 12 years his younger was accorded bylines in almost every issue from its inception for photographs of stately homes and portraits of artists, and performers. During the interwar period, Clarke's clientele included rich and prominent Melbourne society figures at Government House and Flemington race track; Lady Stradbroke (wife of the Governor of Victoria), Dame Margaret Davidson (wife of the Governor of NSW), and Lady Allardyce (wife of the Governor of Tasmania).

Her main rival, Ruth Hollick, award-winning society photographer who exhibited in Australia and internationally, and one of Australia's most successful professional photographers soon became a friend. With her professional and life partner Dorothy Izard, Hollick met the painter Dora Wilson and her lifelong companion Pegg Clarke (the pair were soon to share a studio), and together the two close couples forged a strong personal friendship. A 1937 article in The Australian Home Beautiful makes clear that despite their lasting relationship their tastes differed, with Wilson favouring period-style decor for their studio and Clarke, the modernist furnishings.

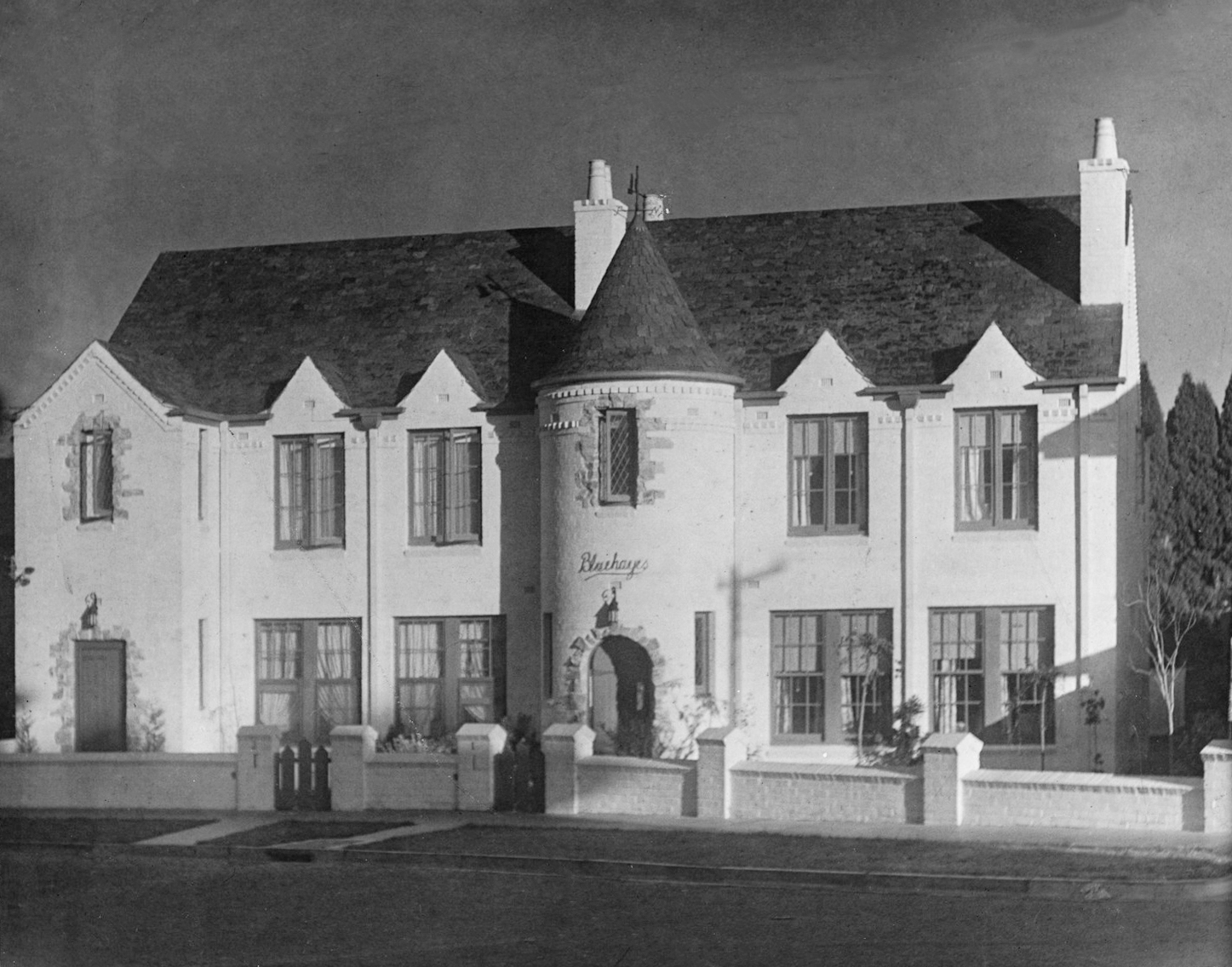
Pegg Clarke (c.1930s) Two storey block of flats 'Bluehayes', 15-17 Coolullah Ave., South Yarra, Melbourne.

By the end of WWI Clarke, along with her friend Hollick, were considered the leading photographers in Melbourne. Both were respected for their fashion photography, their high society portraits, especially of debutantes and brides, and their portraits of visiting celebrities such those by Clarke of actress Joan Rowell, wives of diplomats and composer/musician Margaret Sutherland. Amongst Clarke's more famous friends, and subjects of her portraits were Australian poet Dorothea Mackellar, and Dame Sybil Thorndike The Australian Gallery Directors' Council notes that, "[t]he role of Cazneaux covering home and social photographs for magazine in Sydney was shared by Hollick and Clarke in Melbourne." Hollick specialised in fashion photography and Clarke in interiors and architecture. She also provided photographic reproductions of her friend Dora Wilson's paintings to the press.

From 1923 Clarke started to advertise her services with mention of her inclusions in "The London Salon 1921" and "The Pittsburgh Salon 1922", and shifted with Wilson to an upstairs studio which they shared in Linden Hall, a block of luxury flats at 403 Glenferrie Road, Malvern, then from 1927-1940s, relocated to a studio she designed at 476 Glenferrie Road, Hawthorn, opposite the private school Scotch College, the clientele and grounds of which she photographed.

=== Europe ===
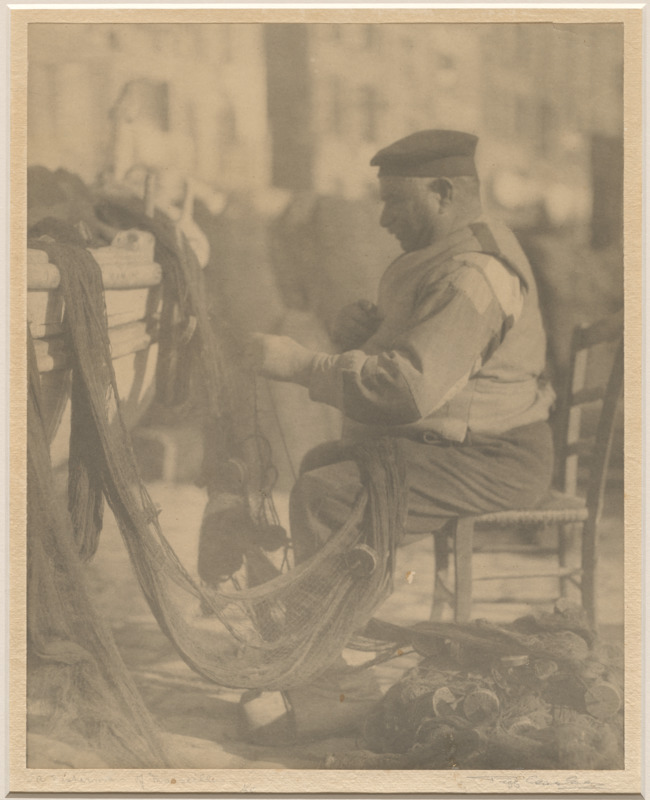
Pegg Clarke (1927-8) A fisherman, Marseille.

Newspapers' social columns covered the couple's activities regularly, and the farewell parties when in April 1927 they readied to depart on a two-and-a-half year tour of Europe, a trip which was partly funded by the anthropologist and art patron Sir Walter Baldwin Spencer who commissioned them to document monuments. The couple, usually Clarke, corresponded regularly to the Australian press, sending lively descriptions of their adventures touring by car to avoid the cost of rail travel and staying in barns in England, and traveling cheaply by boat, train or horse-cart in often remote parts of France, Spain, Italy, Sardinia, Corsica, Belgium and Germany. A party to which Hollick, Izard and Jessie Traill invited artist friends was held in newly built Chartres House, Melbourne on their return in October 1929.

In June 1936 Wilson and Clarke spent a week together in Sydney sketching and photographing, and a few days on the journey back to make more pictures.

=== Charitable work ===
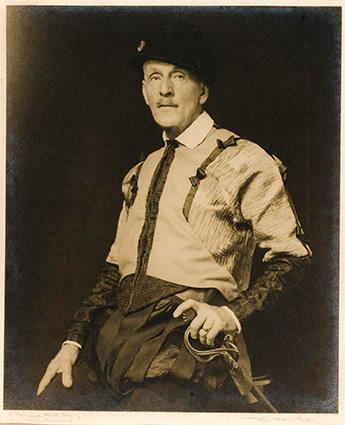
Pegg Clarke (c.1920s) L. Bernard Hall as an Italian Nobleman.

Clarke volunteered her photography for charitable causes; in 1935 a 'Popular Child Competition' in aid of Prince Henry's Hospital Building Fund; and during WWII for the French Red Cross, in which she photographed a series of tableaux vivant of famous paintings acted before the Governor Sir Winston Dugan and Lady Dugan, the Lord Mayor and Mrs. A. W. Coles, the president of the French Red Cross, Mme. Crivelli, and the Consul for France (M. Lancial) and Mme. Lancial, by costumed members of high society and by other artists. She had earlier portrayed, probably for a similar event, L. Bernard Hall, then director the National Gallery of Victoria, dressed as an Italian Nobleman (photograph held in Castlemaine Art Museum). These pictures were reproduced in a double-page spread in Home magazine. For an exhibition at Ruyton Girls' School, Kew, of photographs in aid of war service and Red Cross funds, Clarke donated her own work, and with Wilson contributed to The Argus Fund the Food for Britain Appeal

== Death ==
Dora Wilson died 21 November 1946 after four months of illness, with notices and obituary acknowledging Clarke as "a fellow artist and close friend." Pegg Clarke kept working almost until her own death on 6 June 1959 at the Alfred Private Hospital, Toorak. In her will she left an estate of £14,408 (a value of $548,000.00 in 2025) from which she bequeathed £1,000 and an Arthur Streeton painting and Dora Wilson's Collins Street from the Treasury Building to the Lyceum Club; and £100 to the Brotherhood of St Laurence, Melbourne.

== Style and reception ==
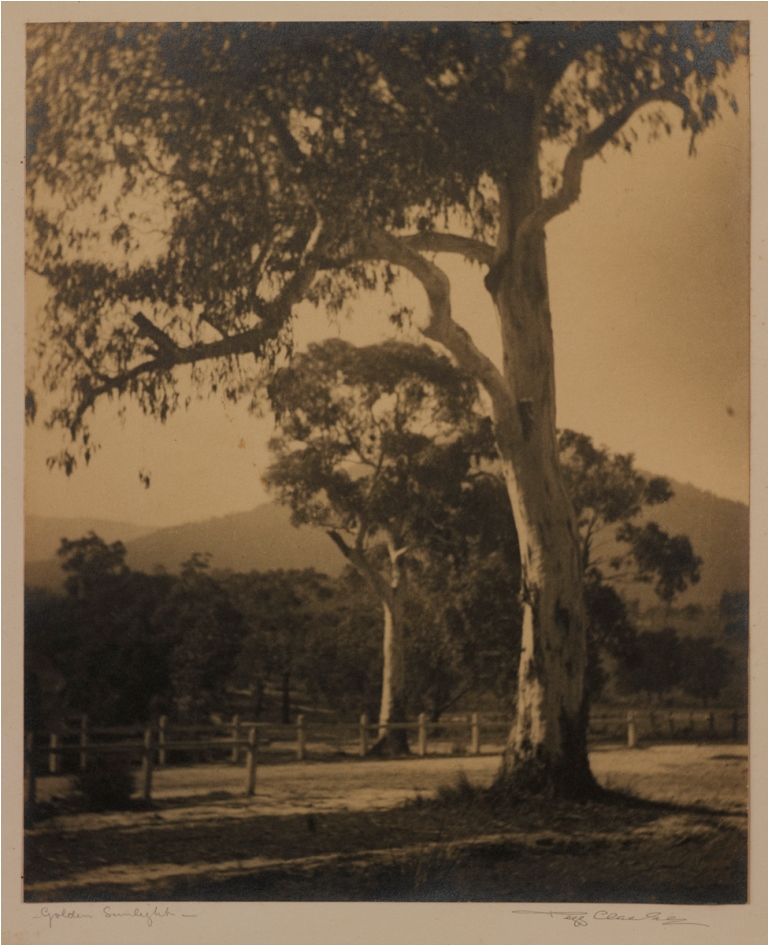
Pegg Clarke (1930s) Golden Sunlight

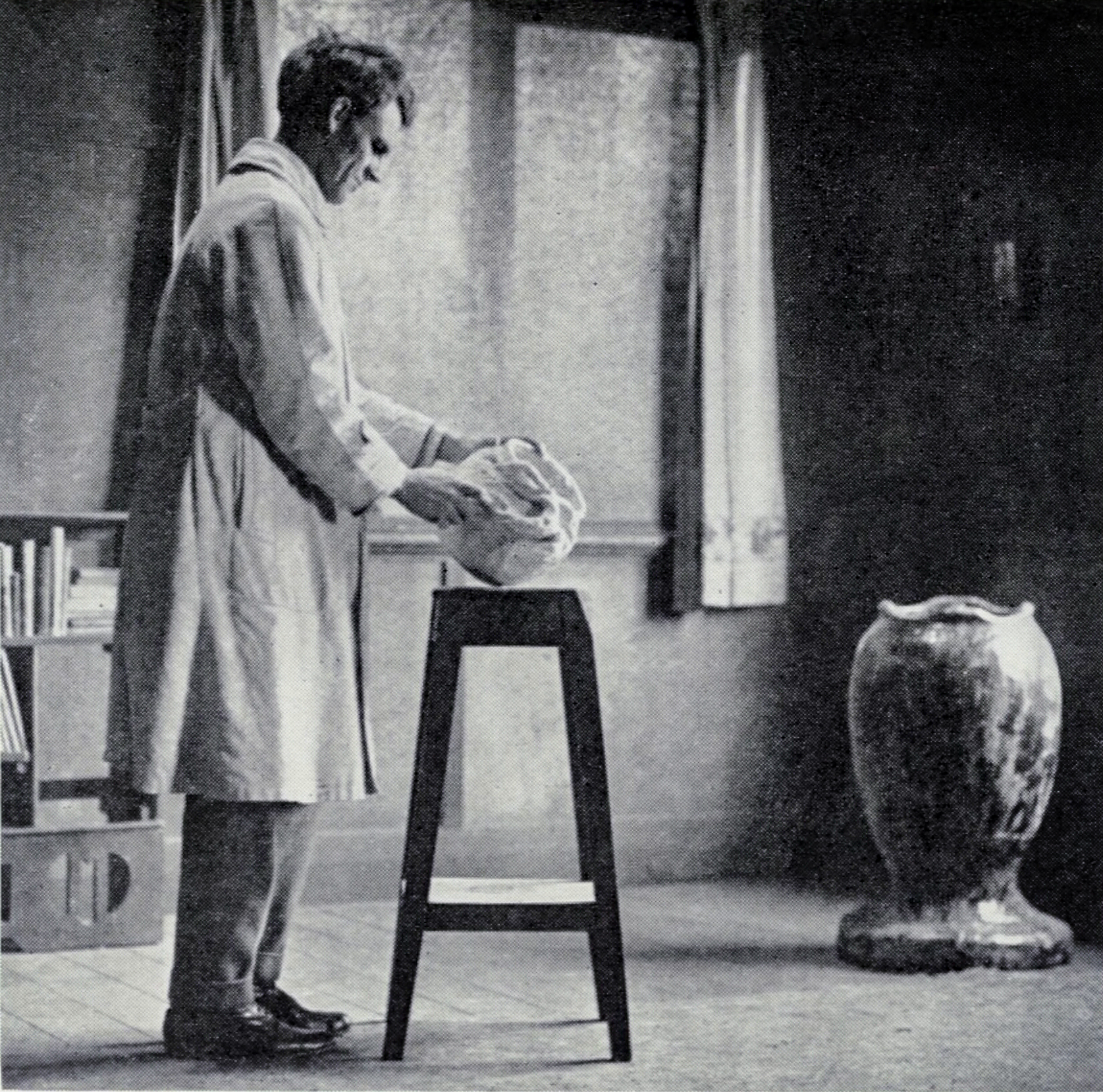
Pegg Clarke, Australian potter Merric Boyd in his studio, 1921

Unlike her friends Clarke was not trained at the National Gallery School, though she drew as well as photographed, but was involved with the Melbourne Society of Women Painters and Sculptors. In her personal work, mostly of landscape, Pegg was a Pictorialist and her impressionistic soft-focus photographs share Dora's tonal-impressionist style of painting which later developed a photographic quality which some have seen as influenced by Clarke's camera work. Comparison of the two artists' works was part of the content for two posthumous shows; Together Again: Celebrating the Work of Pegg Clarke and Dora Wilson and the Town Hall Gallery, Hawthorn in 2009 and Pegg Clarke, Dora Wilson: Companion Pieces, at the Melbourne Lyceum Club, 5 September 5 – 13 November 2012.

Clarke did not join the Melbourne Camera Club as Hollick and Izard had, nor any other formal Pictorialist group. She did however come to know, and portray, prominent artists of the period, including Jessie Traill, one of Australia's most important 20th century printmakers who in 1909, moved to a studio in Temple Court, an arcade off Collins Street in Melbourne, occupied by Janet Cumbrae Stewart, Norah Gurdon and A. M. E. Bale, and where she may have first met Dora Wilson. Clarke was also friendly with artists Margaret Maclean, Guelda Pyke, and Polly Hurry.

Winning awards at the All-Australian Peace Exhibition, Adelaide, beside Monte Luke, as announced in the May 1920 Australasian photo-review,. Clarke's work was included in a London Salon exhibition of the Royal Photographic Society in 1921, and Director of the Pittsburg U.S.A. Salon of Photography included three of her platinum prints of Australian landscape in their annual Exhibition. A favourable review appeared on her work in 1922 in Adelaide where she was showing with Dora Wilson in Elisabeth Wright's gallery while another reviewer of the same show notes: "Miss Pegg Clarke shows some photographs of scenery that are certainly worthy of being hung as works of art;" and still another:

Pegg Clarke (Melbourne) has made of photography a consummate art. On gazing at her photographs, several of what one might aptly term "treescapes" having a soft melting grace reminiscent of a Corot without colouring, makes it absolutely indifferent to academic discussions of whether photography is an art or a craft. Only an artist could make such pictures by camera as those by Pegg Clarke, a very beautiful sample of which (Mist on the Mountains) was hung, in the London Salon, 1921.

Pegg showed in a group exhibition at Geelong Art Gallery in July 1922 and in 1923 she exhibited in a Colonial Prints Exhibition run by the English magazine, Amateur Photographer. Her photograph Mist in the Mountains was reproduced in Cameragraphs, and included in the first Exhibition of the Australian Salon of Photography in 1924, the only Australian woman to be included in this exhibition. In a July 1924 review of a group exhibition at Queen's Hall, critic J. S. MacDonald remarks that "Pegg Clarke's three photographs of landscape motifs are excellent." In October, she participated in a group show at the May Club, Netter Buildings, Gresham street, Adelaide about which it was reported that; "Miss Pegg Clarke, of Melbourne, shows some exquisite photographic studies, mostly of gum trees and country scenes. A delightful atmosphere pervades her pictures."A delightful atmosphere pervades her pictures."[1]

On return from touring in Europe in October 1929, in 1930 Clarke held a solo exhibition at The Little Gallery in Melbourne which was reviewed by Arthur Streeton:

The exhibition of photography by Miss Peg [sic] Clarke, which was opened yesterday at the Little Gallery, Little Collins street, is a revelation of what may be attained by sincere study and a remarkable perception of what is beautiful. This exhibition, consisting of about 100 prints, embraces subjects of interest in Great Britain, France, Italy and Australia. Without any forcing of contrast, with no unduly black shadows, and without any apparent additional finish by washes with a brush, Miss Clarke attains an exhibition of pure photographs which does not in any way attempt the qualities one may look for in an oil or water colour painting. As an exhibition of art the standard maintained is much more artistic and in a much higher average of quality than that in most of your shows of painting. No. 68 Mdlle Delphine, as a study of portraiture could not be better. Two studies of a child uncatalogued, one a back view and another reading a book, are remarkable for their simplicity and quiet beauty. No.6 Nelson and 20, The King's Archway, are perfect gems in reserved silver tones. No 84, The Workaday World, Venice, and No. 90, Venetian Canal are vivid memories of water reflections in Venice. No. 16. Noon-day, is a one arrangement of lighting and general interest of a narrow street. No. 64, The Muleteer, Corsica, No 73a, Neighbours, and No. 23, An English Lane, are but a few of the many delightful camera pictures that await the spectator. The study required for the production of these prints must have been unusual. Many are already sold, and the exhibition should be visited by art students and all who are interested in art and general culture.

Melbourne Herald art critic Basil Burdett favourably reviewed a show by Clarke in her studio in November 1936;

"England and the Continent, as well as her native Australia, have provided Miss Pegg Clarke with a wide variety of subject and scene in her exhibition of camera pictures, which Mrs R. D. Elliott will open at 437 Glenferrie Road, to night. Spain, the small towns of the French Riviera, Florence, the Cornish coast and Swiss canals contrast with the native beauties of gum and ti-tree and the coast at Lorne in this attractive show. Miss Clarke has an eye for something other than the merely picturesque, and most of our painters might study the composition of these carefully-selected subjects with profit. Some of the Australian photographs, in particular, should make our realistic painters sit up and take notice. Camera pictures like A Fringe of Trees (No. 27), and In the Dandenongs (No. 57) are far more satisfying pictorial records— not only better composed but more convincing in atmosphere and sense of place— than many pictures in oils and water-color seen in some recent exhibitions."

Artist Harold Herbert provided glowing reviews of the show in The Argus and The Australasian newspapers for both its opening, and its closing;

A show by Miss Pegg Clarke which closed last Saturday was one of the best photographic exhibitions of the year. All people who appreciate the art of the camera admire Miss Clarke's work, and this show of prints—mostly of places abroad—more than justified her reputation. One can generally tell if work is drudgery or not. In the case of Miss Clarke it was obviously not so. A spirit of interest and pleasure seems to emanate from her records of curious old-world towns. An item of supreme importance, as far as photography is concerned, is choice of subject, and, having found it, to compose it in an acceptable manner. Miss Clarke has the good fortune to have a natural instinct for this, coupled with the necessary technical knowledge required for the ultimate results. Her subjects embraced all manner of things be loved of the painter—particularly in land scape—and the general excellence was such that to choose several as being better than others is scarcely worth while. Mrs. R. D. Elliott opened the show on November 17.

== Collections ==
- Castlemaine Art Museum
- National Gallery of Australia
- State Library of Victoria

== Exhibitions ==
- 1915: Prize – Pegg Clarke was awarded a prize at the Australian Photo-Review competition for her child portrait Winnie.
- 1920: All-Australian Peace Exhibition, Adelaide
- 1922: three platinum prints included in the Pittsburg U.S.A. Salon of Photography annual Exhibition."
- 1923: inclusion in London Salon held by the Royal Photographic Society.
- 1923: featured in the Colonial Prints Exhibition, organised by the English magazine Amateur Photographer
- 1924: Amateur Photographer and Cinematographer competition for overseas readers, Royal Photographic Society gallery
- 1924: Mist in the Mountains shown in the first Australian Salon of Photography
- 1930: Solo exhibition, The Little Gallery, Melbourne, opened by Sir John Longstaff
- 1930: Victorian Salon of Photography exhibition at the Galleries of the Fine Art Society, 100 Exhibition street, Melbourne
- 1931: Victorian Salon of Photography
- 1931: Impressions of Melbourne, Atheneum Gallery with Dora Wilson.
- 1932 Camera pictures by Pegg Clarke (solo), opened by Dame Sybil Thorndike, Atheneum Gallery, 5–17 December
- 1933: Studio exhibition at 403 Glenferrie Road, Hawthorn, with Dora Wilson, opened by Mrs. I. H. Moss, August.
- 1934: Arts and Crafts Society's annual exhibition, Lower Melbourne Town Hall, opened by Lady Huntlngfleld, 19-29 Sept
- 1935: Amateur Photographer and Cinematographer competition for overseas readers, Royal Photographic Society gallery, May
- 1935: Group show with Blamire Young, Harold Herbert, A. M. E. Bale, Daryl Lindsay, Jessie Traill, Louis McCubbin, Murray Griffin, Dora Wilson, Eveline Syme, Polly Hurry, Esther and Betty Paterson, Sheila McCubbin, Alice Newell and Anne Montgomery, Allan's Music Rooms, Bendigo, 8–13 July
- 1936: Seven Countries With a Camera, studio exhibition at 403 Glenferrie Road, Hawthorn, opened by Mrs. R. D. Elliott, 18–28 November
- 1940: Combined exhibition of Institute of Victorian Photographers, the Melbourne Camera Club, the Pictorial Photographic Group, the Sydney Camera Circle, Press Photographers' Union, and private exhibitors, Exhibition Building Melbourne
- 1941: Exhibition in aid of war service and Red Cross, Ruyton Girls' School, Kew, August

=== Posthumous ===
- 1981: Australian Women Photographers 1840–1950, George Paton Gallery, Melbourne.
- 2002: Lyceum Club 90th birthday exhibition, represented with Marion Jones, Henrietta Gulliver, Mary Macqueen, Mrs. Alfred Deakin, May Vale, Dora Wilson, Aileen Dent, Marjorie McChesney Mathews, Janie Wilkinson Whyte, Ruby Winifred McCubbin, Dora Meeson Coates, Ethel Carrick Fox, Edith Alsop, Josephine Muntz Adams, Dora Serle, John Mather, Jessie Traill, Ethel Spowers, Arthur Streeton, Madge Freeman, Esther Paterson, Hans Heysen, Janet Agnes Cumbrae Stewart, Anne Montgomery, Emanuel Phillips Fox, George Coates, Violet Teague, Rupert Bunny, Edith Alsop, Elsie Barlow, Bertha Merfield, Lois W. Baglin, Eveline Syme. 20 March-1 May
- 2009: Together Again: Celebrating the Work of Pegg Clarke and Dora Wilson. Town Hall Gallery, Hawthorn, Vic.
- 2012: Pegg Clarke, Dora Wilson: Companion Pieces, The Lyceum Club 5 Sept – 13 Nov
