= Edmund Armstrong =

Edmund Armstrong may refer to:

- Sir Edmund Armstrong, 2nd Baronet (1836–1899)
- Edmund John Armstrong (1841–1865), Irish poet
- Edmund la Touche Armstrong (1864–1946), Australian historian and librarian
