= Norah Gurdon =

Australian painter

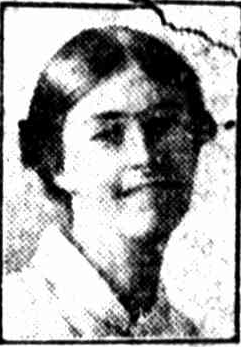
- Born: Jan-March 1882; Norfolk, England
- Died: 27 June 1974; Kalorama, Victoria, Australia
- Education: National Gallery Art School
- Known for: Painting, Portraiture, Weaving
- Movement: Impressionism, Post-Impressionism, Heidelberg School
- Awards: British Victory Medal for services during the war

Norah Gurdon (Jan-March 1882 – 27 June 1974) was an Australian artist. Her first name is often misspelled Nora in many articles reviewing her work.

== Early life ==
Norah Gurdon was born around Jan-March 1882 in Norfolk, England, to Dr. Edwin John Gurdon and Ellen Ann Randall. She was baptised on 11 April 1882. She was the second of four surviving children, and her family emigrated to Ballarat, Victoria in 1886, travelling on board ship the Carlisle Castle. They eventually settled in Brighton where her father had a doctor's surgery at their home. Gurdon showed early artistic talent while attending Brighton High School for Girls.

== Career ==
Gurdon attended the National Gallery School from 1901 to 1908, being taught by noted artists Frederick McCubbin and Bernard Hall. While there she studied with fellow artists Jessie Traill, Dora Wilson, Constance Jenkins, and Janet Cumbrae Stewart, who were to become her lifelong friends. An accomplished landscape and still-life painter, Gurdon exhibited her works with the Victorian Artists Society while still a student. She established her artistic prowess early on by winning the major category for oil painting in the 1909 City of Prahran's Art Exhibition Prize. By the following year she had rented a studio in Collins Street along with friends Stewart and Traill. As well as being a prominent figure in the Melbourne Society of Painters and Sculptors, Gurdon went on to exhibit with fellow National Gallery School alumni in 1913 as part of Twelve Melbourne Painters. The group included Ruth Sutherland, Charles Wheeler, Dora Wilson, May Roxburgh, Percy Leason, Louis McCubbin, Penleigh Boyd, H. B. Harrison, and Frank Cozier.

=== World War I ===
Intending to continue her artistic training overseas, in 1914 Gurdon travelled to England with her sister Winifred. Gurdon along with friend Jessie Traill was stuck in Europe due to the outbreak of war ten weeks after arriving. She signed up as a British Red Cross volunteer nurse in a French military hospital at Le Croisic, serving for three and a half years and was awarded a British Victory medal for her services. Much of her painting during this time was landscapes from travels to England and Scotland prior to war breaking out, and when armistice was reached in 1920 she stayed on to paint through Scotland, Suffolk, and Cornwall. This was hardly her only venture overseas however, as she returned in 1927, meeting fellow artists Pegg Clarke and Dora Wilson in Rome, and narrowly avoiding World War II on her 1938 travels to Norway and Sweden.

=== Kalorama ===
Unlike many other female artists of the time, Norah Gurdon was unmarried and financially independent. She purchased land in 1922 with plans to build her dream house in the Dandenong Ranges at Kalorama. When the house was finished she lived there with her sister Winifred and had many fellow artists as guests, with former students and teachers joining her for plen air landscape painting. While Gurdon painted in an impressionist style similar to her contemporaries, she favoured muted blue and grey tones to capture the hills of the Dandenongs. She also enjoyed handicrafts, spending her spare time at tapestry looms designing and producing her own floor rugs and mats.

Selected photographs

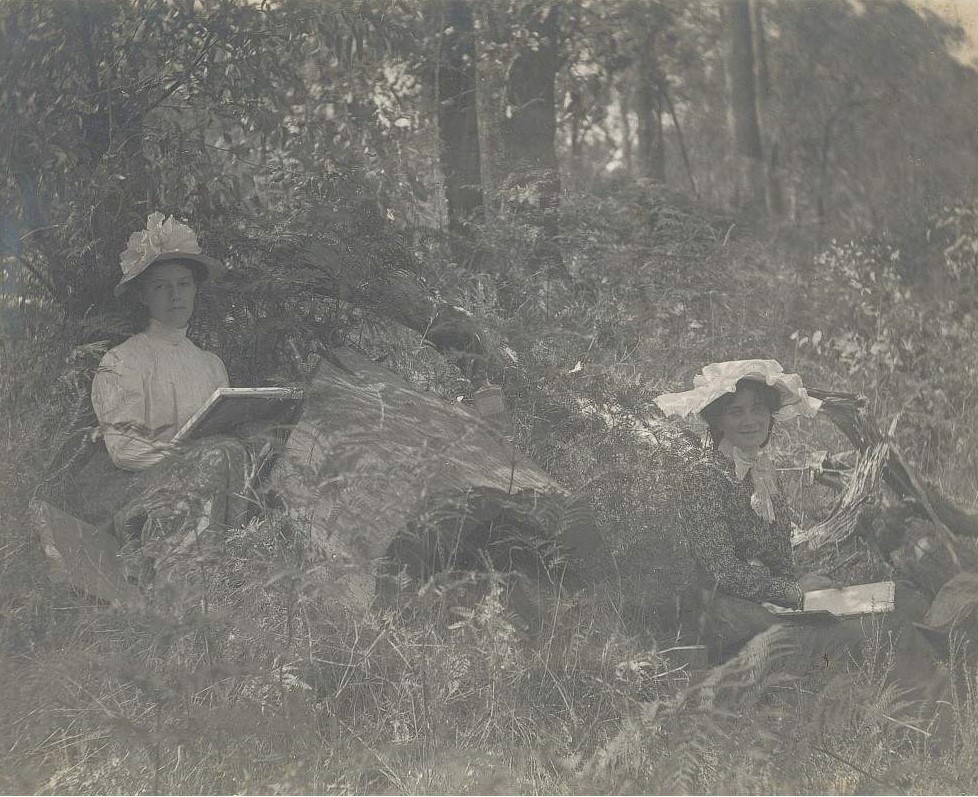
Norah Gurdon and Janet Cumbrae Stewart, Private collection

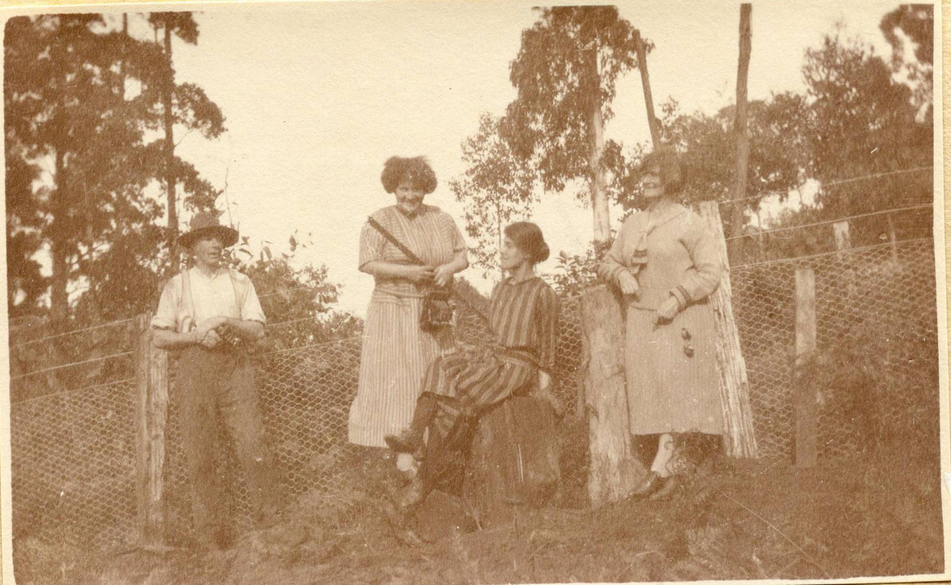
Pegg Clarke, Norah Gurdon, and Dora Wilson (and Brompton) at Kalorama, Private collection

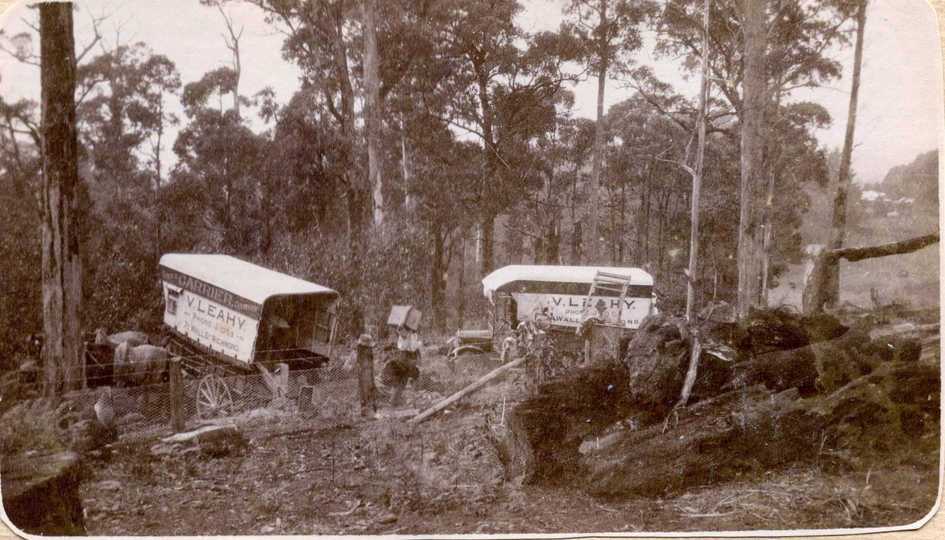
Moving into Kalorama, Private collection

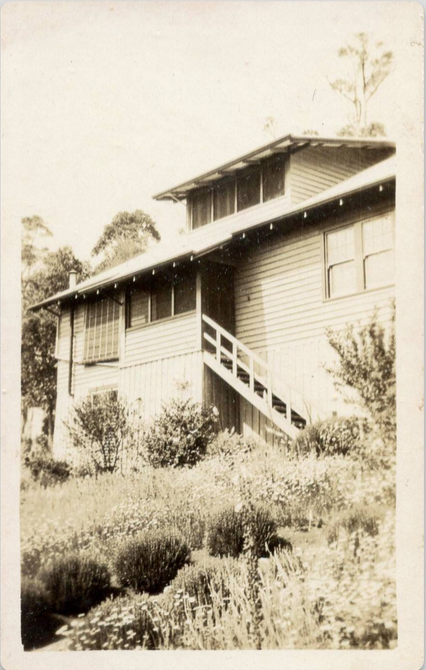
Finished house at Kalorama, Private collection

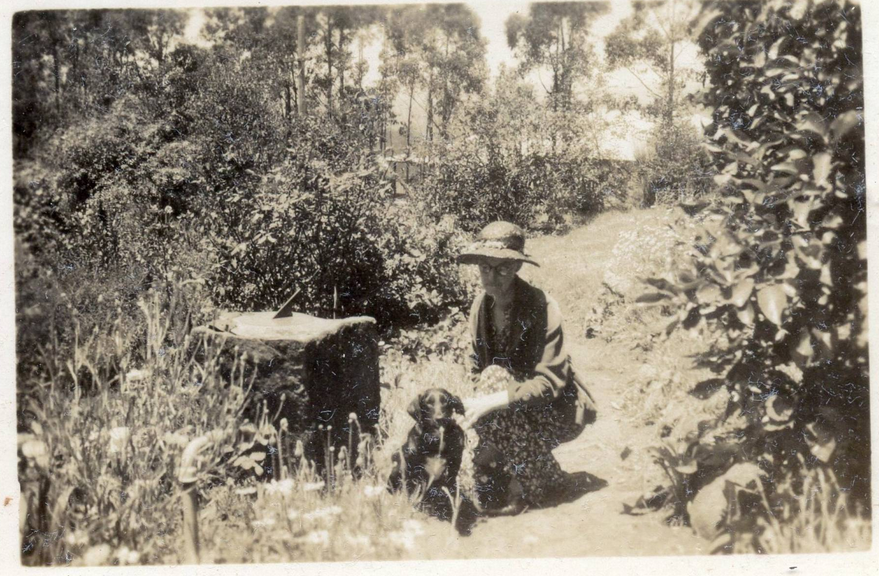
Norah and Terry, Private collection

== Exhibitions ==
Gurdon was a regular and successful exhibitor of work, exhibiting with the Victorian Artists Society, Melbourne Society of Women Painters and Sculptors, and the Australian Art Association. In the 1920s she held many solo exhibitions at the Athenaeum Gallery, and later at the Women's Industrial Arts Society in Sydney, and the Royal Queensland Art Society in Brisbane. She held an exhibition in 1937 at the Fine Arts Gallery in aid of the construction of St George's Hospital in Kew.

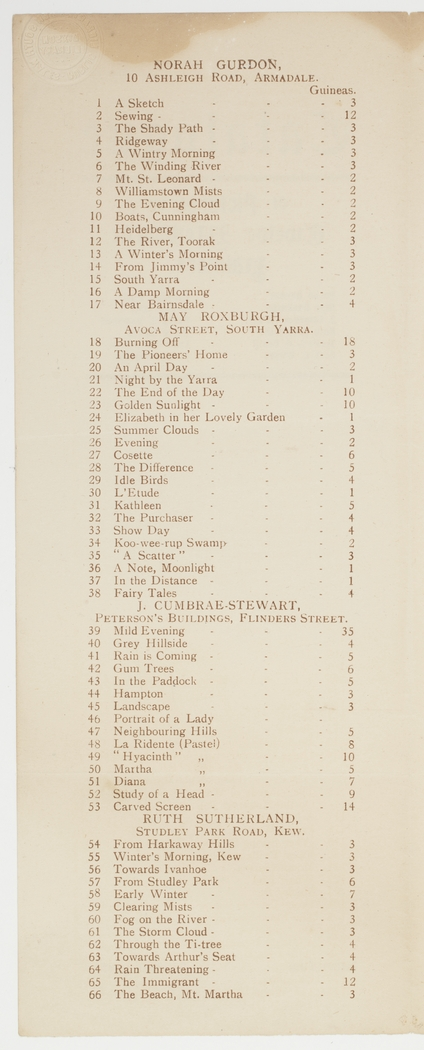
Exhibition catalogue of Twelve Melbourne Painters (page 2), State Library of New South Wales

1909

- The Waddy Club, Guildhall, Melbourne, June 1909

1910

- Victorian Artists' Society, Athenaeum Art Gallery, Melbourne, October 1910

1911

- City of Prahran Art Exhibition (First Prize in Oils for the work "Tottie"), September 1911

1912

- Group exhibition (with Dora Wilson and Ruth Sutherland), Tuckett and Styles' Art Gallery, Melbourne, 7 - 18 May 1912
- Victorian Artists' Society Autumn Exhibition, Albert St Galleries, Eastern Hill, Melbourne, 16 - 30 April 1912
- Victorian Artists' Society annual exhibition, Albert St Galleries, Eastern Hill, Melbourne, July 1912

1913

- Twelve Melbourne Painters, Athenaeum Gallery, Melbourne, September 1913
- Victorian Artists Society annual exhibition, Albert St Galleries, Eastern Hill, Melbourne, September 1913

1915

- Private viewing at studio, 404 Fulham Road, London, July 1915

1920

- Solo exhibition, Athenaeum Gallery, Melbourne, 18 - 28 May 1920
- Society of Women Painters, Queen Victoria Building, Sydney, August 1920

1921

- Solo exhibition, Queensland Art Society's Gallery, Kent Building, Brisbane, April 1921
- Miss Margaret McLean Studio, Melbourne, April 1921
- Victorian Artists' Society Autumn Exhibition, Albert St Galleries, Eastern Hill, Melbourne, 1921
- Victorian Artists' Society Spring Exhibition, Albert St Galleries, Eastern Hill, Melbourne, 1921

1922

- The Gordon Art Club, Stanley Davidson Memorial Gall, Gordon Institute, Geelong, 27 July - 8 August 1922
- Victorian Artists Society Spring Exhibition, Albert St Galleries, Eastern Hill, Melbourne, 1922

1923

- Solo exhibition, Athenaeum Gallery, Melbourne, 10 - 23 April 1923
- Melbourne Society of Women Painters and Sculptors Annual exhibition, May 1923
- Australian Pictures for London Exhibition, Education Building, Sydney, June 1923
- Women's Art Club, Athenaeum Gallery, Melbourne, August 1923
- Queensland Art Society, Brisbane, November 1923
- Royal Academy Exhibition of Australian Art, London, 1923
- Empire Exhibition, Australian Court of the Fine Art Palace, London, December 1923

1924

- Society of Women Painters Annual Exhibition, Education Department Gallery, Sydney, May 1924
- Women's Art Club, Athenaeum Gallery, Melbourne, 1 - 11 October 1924

1925

- Miss Margaret McLean Studio, Melbourne, 26 March - 8 April 1925
- Solo exhibition, Athenaeum Gallery, Melbourne, 20- 30 May 1925
- Women's Art Club, Athenaeum Gallery, Melbourne, June 1925
- Sedon Galleries, Hardware Chambers, Melbourne, October 1925
- Exhibition of oils and watercolours, Sedon Galleries, Melbourne, 14 -18 December 1925

1926

- Society of Women Painters, Education Department Galleries, Sydney, April 1926
- Fundraising exhibition for the Children's Hospital, Fine Art Society's Gallery, Melbourne, July 1926
- Works in oil and watercolour by Australian Artists, New Gallery, Melbourne, 6 - 20 July 1926
- Arts and Crafts Society Annual Exhibition, Society's Rooms, Melbourne, (Exhibited a bag, hat and baskets) 21 September - 16 October 1926
- Melbourne Society of Women Painters and Sculptors annual exhibition, October 1926
- Women's Art Club, Athenaeum Gallery, Melbourne, 1 - 11 December 1926

1927

- Solo exhibition, Athenaeum Gallery, 28 April - 7 May 1927
- Collection of Mr E.H. Serle's Pictures, Victorian Artists' Society, Albert St Galleries, Eastern Hill, Melbourne, May 1927
- Miss Margret MacLean Gallery, Cornhill Building, Melbourne, September 1927
- The Arts and Craft Society of Victoria, (First Prize for Best Raffin Bag (joint winner)), Melbourne, September 1927
- Victorian Artists' Society Spring Exhibition, Albert St Galleries, Eastern Hill, Melbourne, October 1927

1928

- Women's Art Club Annual Exhibition, Athenaeum Gallery, Melbourne, October 1928

1929

- Australian Painters, New Gallery, Melbourne, 12 - 26 March 1929
- "Record of a short tour abroad", Solo exhibition, New Gallery, Melbourne, 9 - 20 April 1929
- Arts and Crafts Society of Victoria, Melbourne Town Hall, Melbourne, 1 - 12 October 1929
- Victorian Artists' Society Spring Exhibition, Albert St Galleries, Eastern Hill, Melbourne, October 1929
- Women's Art Club Annual Exhibition, Athenaeum Gallery, Melbourne, October 1929

1930

- War artists exhibition, Sedon Galleries, Melbourne, May 1930
- Society of Women Painters, Education Department Galleries, Sydney, May 1930
- The Cheyne Gallery, Melbourne, June 1930
- Victorian Artists' Society exhibition, Albert St Galleries, Eastern Hill, Melbourne, October 1930

1931

- Victorian Artists' Society exhibition, Albert St Galleries, Eastern Hill, Melbourne, April 1931
- Society of Women Painters, Athenaeum Gallery, Melbourne, September 1931

1932

- Hand weaving exhibition, Arts and Crafts Society of Victoria Rooms, Little Collins Street, (Exhibited woolen rugs) 29 January - 5 February 1932
- Exhibition of Paintings and Miniatures, Athenaeum Gallery, Melbourne, 3 - 23 July 1932
- Victorian Artists' Society Spring Exhibition, Albert St Galleries, Eastern Hill, Melbourne, 26 September - 9 October 1932

1933

- South Australian Society of Arts Spring Exhibition, Society's Gallery, North Terrace, Adelaide, 21 September - 12 October 1933
- Melbourne Society of Women Painters Annual Exhibition, Athenaeum Gallery, 10 - 24 October 1933
- Arts and Crafts Society of Victoria, Melbourne, October 1933

1934

- Victorian Artists' Society Autumn Exhibition, Albert St Galleries, Eastern Hill, Melbourne, 1 - 13 May 1934
- Society of Women Painters Annual Exhibition, Education Department Gallery, Sydney, May 1934
- Society of Women Painters Exhibition, Education Department Gallery, Sydney, July 1934
- Arts and Crafts Society Annual Exhibition, Lower Melbourne Town Hall, 19 - 29 September 1934
- Victorian Artists' Society Spring Exhibition, Albert St Galleries, Eastern Hill, Melbourne, October 1934
- Melbourne Society of Women Painters, 16 - 27 October 1934
- Melbourne Society of Women Painters, Athenaeum Gallery, October 1934
- Solo exhibition, Kalorama studio at home, 24 November - 2 December 1934

1935

- Victorian Artists' Society Spring Exhibition, Albert St Galleries, Eastern Hill, Melbourne, 26 April - 10 May 1935

1936

- Paintings by Australian Artists, Stair Gallery, Melbourne, 25 February - 11 March 1936
- Women's Industrial Arts Society Exhibition, Victoria Arcade, Sydney, May 1936
- Society of Twenty Melbourne Painters Annual Exhibition, Athenaeum Hall, Melbourne, September 1936
- Melbourne Society of Women Painters Annual Exhibition, Athenaeum Gallery, Melbourne, October 1936
- Arts and Crafts Society of Victoria, Lower Melbourne Town Hall, (Exhibited woven bags and belts), October 1936

1937

- Arts and Crafts Society of Victoria, Collins Street, Melbourne, (Exhibited tapestry, woven bags and a woven hen) February 1937
- Solo Fundraising exhibition for St George's Hospital Building League, Fine Art Society's Gallery, Melbourne, 6 - 17 April 1937
- Arts and Crafts Society of Victoria Annual Exhibition, Lower Melbourne Town Hall, (Exhibited a tapestry cushion) September 1937
- Melbourne Society of Women Painters Annual Exhibition, Athenaeum Gallery, Melbourne, 5 - 16 October 1937

1939

- Fundraising exhibition for the Bush Fire Relief Fund, Athenaeum Gallery, Melbourne, February 1939
- Hawthorn Municipal Library, July - 5 August 1939
- Melbourne Society of Women Painters Annual Exhibition, Athenaeum Gallery, Melbourne, 3 - 14 October 1939

1940

- Melbourne Society of Women Painters Annual Exhibition, Athenaeum Gallery, Melbourne, 15 - 26 October 1940
- Fundraising exhibition for the Lord Mayor's Patriotic Appeal, Sedon Gallery, Melbourne, November 1940

1941

- Melbourne Society of Women Painters Annual Exhibition, Athenaeum Gallery, Melbourne, 21October - 1 November 1941

1942

- Melbourne Society of Women Painters Annual Exhibition, Athenaeum Gallery, October 1942

1943

- Solo Fundraising exhibition for Red Cross Prisoners of War Fund, Sedon Gallery, Melbourne, 24 March - 4 April 1943

1944

- 6th Annual Australian Academy of Art (Southern division), Melbourne, July 1944
- The Blue Door, Melbourne, July 1944
- The Blue Door, Melbourne, November 1944

1945

- The Blue Door, Melbourne, February 1945

1946

- Spring Collection of Pictures, The Blue Door, Melbourne, September 1946
- Melbourne Society of Women Painters Annual Exhibition, Athenaeum Gallery, Melbourne, 15 - 25 October 1946

1949

- Dandenong Ranges Group Handicrafts Exhibition, Shire Hall, Ferntree Gully, (Exhibited floor rugs and weavings), June 1949
- Solo Fundraising exhibition for "the Food for Britain Fund' and the "Church of England Diocesan Homes for Elderly People," Sedon Gallery, Melbourne, August 1949
- Christmas Show, Sedon Gallery, Melbourne, December 1949

1950

- Paintings by Past and Present Australian Artists, Sedon Galleries, June 1950

1953

- "Herald outdoor art show 1953", Treasury Gardens, Melbourne, 12 - 20 December 1953

1977

- "Project 21: Women's Images of Women", Art Gallery of New South Wales, Sydney, 15 October - 13 November 1977

1995

- "The Women's View: Australian women artists in the Bendigo Art Gallery, 1888-1995", Bendigo Art Gallery, Bendigo, 8 March - 2 April 1995
- "A l'hombre des jeunes filles et des fleurs: In the shadow of young girls and flowers", Benalla Art Gallery, Benalla, 10 March - 28 May 1995

2021

- "Her Own Path", Bayside Gallery, Melbourne, 13 March - 19 May 2021
- "Trailblazers: Women of the Yarra Ranges", Yarra Ranges Regional Museum, 6 March - 26 July 2021

== Collections ==
Norah Gurdon's work is held in the collections of Shepparton Art Museum, Yarra Ranges Regional Museum, Castlemaine Art Gallery, National Gallery of Victoria, Bendigo Art Gallery, Benalla Art Gallery, and Brighton Historical Society.
