= Peggie Crombie =

Australian modernist painter

- Peggie Crombie, painted by Sybil Craig, 1932
- Born: 1901; Melbourne, Victoria, Australia
- Died: 1984 (aged 82–83)
- Known for: Painting

Peggie (or Peggy) Crombie (1901–1984) was an Australian modernist painter. She was a member of the Melbourne Society of Women Painters and Sculptors.

== Biography ==
Crombie was born in 1901 in Melbourne, Australia. In 1921 she studied art at Stott's Commercial Art Training Institute. From 1922 through 1928 she attended the National Gallery Art School in Melbourne, where she was taught by Lindsay Bernard Hall, William Beckwith McInnes and George Bell.

Crombie exhibited her work with modernist groups in Melbourne, specifically The Embryos, the 1932 Group, the New Art Club, the Melbourne Society of Women Painters and Sculptors, and the Victorian Artists Society.

Crombie died in 1984.
