= Ruth Hollick =

Australian portrait and fashion photographer

- Born: 17 March 1883; Melbourne, Australia
- Died: 7 April 1977 (aged 94); Sandringham, Victoria
- Occupation: Photographer

Ruth Miriam Hollick (17 March 1883 – 7 April 1977) was an Australian portrait and fashion photographer who was one of Melbourne's leading Pictorialist photographers during the 1920s.

== Education and personal life ==
Ruth Miriam Hollick was born in the Williamstown area of Melbourne, Australia, in 1883, the last of 13 children of Harry Ebenezer Hollick, a civil servant, and Frances Jane (Cole) Hollick. She was raised in the suburb of Moonee Ponds and educated at the National Gallery of Victoria Art School (1902–06), where one of her teachers was the painter Frederick McCubbin, but she received no formal training in photography.

Her professional partner, Dorothy Izard, was also her life partner.

== Photography career ==
There is evidence that Hollick was experimenting with photography in a home darkroom by 1907. The following year, she set herself up as a freelance photographer who toured rural areas of the state of Victoria, making portraits of families, especially children. She worked mostly outdoors in natural light with a field camera.

By World War I, Hollick had shifted into studio photography, initially working out of her parents' house in Moonee Ponds and later moving into Mina Moore's former studio in the Auditorium Building downtown, subsequently expanding still further into Chartres House.

== Style ==
It was in this period that Hollick developed a reputation for skillful use of both natural and studio lighting and for stylish compositions, often setting her subjects against plain backgrounds. She specialized in portraits of society figures and celebrities, as well as fashion photography for use in advertisements. For example, she took several pictures of the British aviator Amy Johnson on her 1930 world tour, including the official Australian portrait.

== Recognition ==
For most of the 1920s, Hollick was one of Melbourne's two leading photographers, along with Pegg Clarke, and she exhibited her work both locally and internationally. Palmer and Jolly make the case that Hollick's exhibition of children's photographs held in her studio in 1928 was 'most likely the first solo exhibition by a female photographer in Australia,’ though that it was the 'first solo exhibition by an Australian woman photographer in Australia' is more strictly correct, as Batchen points to 'a display of twenty albumen prints by [British photographer] Julia Margaret Cameron in 1874 in the Drawing Room of Government House'.

During this period of the 'twenties Hollick won at least six silver awards and numerous bronze awards in various shows. Her photographs were regularly published in Art in Australia and other Australian magazines. However, during the Great Depression she was obliged to give up her downtown studios and returned to working from Moonee Ponds.

== Legacy ==
In 1950, Hollick and Izard embarked on their first overseas travel, visiting relatives and touring the UK. On their return they moved to Heidelberg. Hollick retired from photography in 1950 and died in 1977 at Sandringham.

== Selected exhibitions ==
- The Paris End: Photography, Fashion & Glamour (2007; National Gallery of Victoria touring exhibition)
- Masterpieces of Australian Photography (1989)
- Amateur Photographer Overseas Exhibition, London (1932)
- Melbourne Exhibition of Pictorial Photography (1929: only woman in show)
- Chicago Photographic Exhibition (1927)
- Colonial Exhibitions of the Royal Photographic Society of Great Britain (1925, 1927)
- London Salon of Photography (1920)

== Collections ==
Hollick's glass plate negatives and original prints are held in collections of the following institutions:

- Ruth Hollick Collection, State Library of Victoria (digitised image collection)
- National Gallery of Australia
- Art Gallery of New South Wales

== Gallery ==
Studio portraits photographed by Ruth Hollick
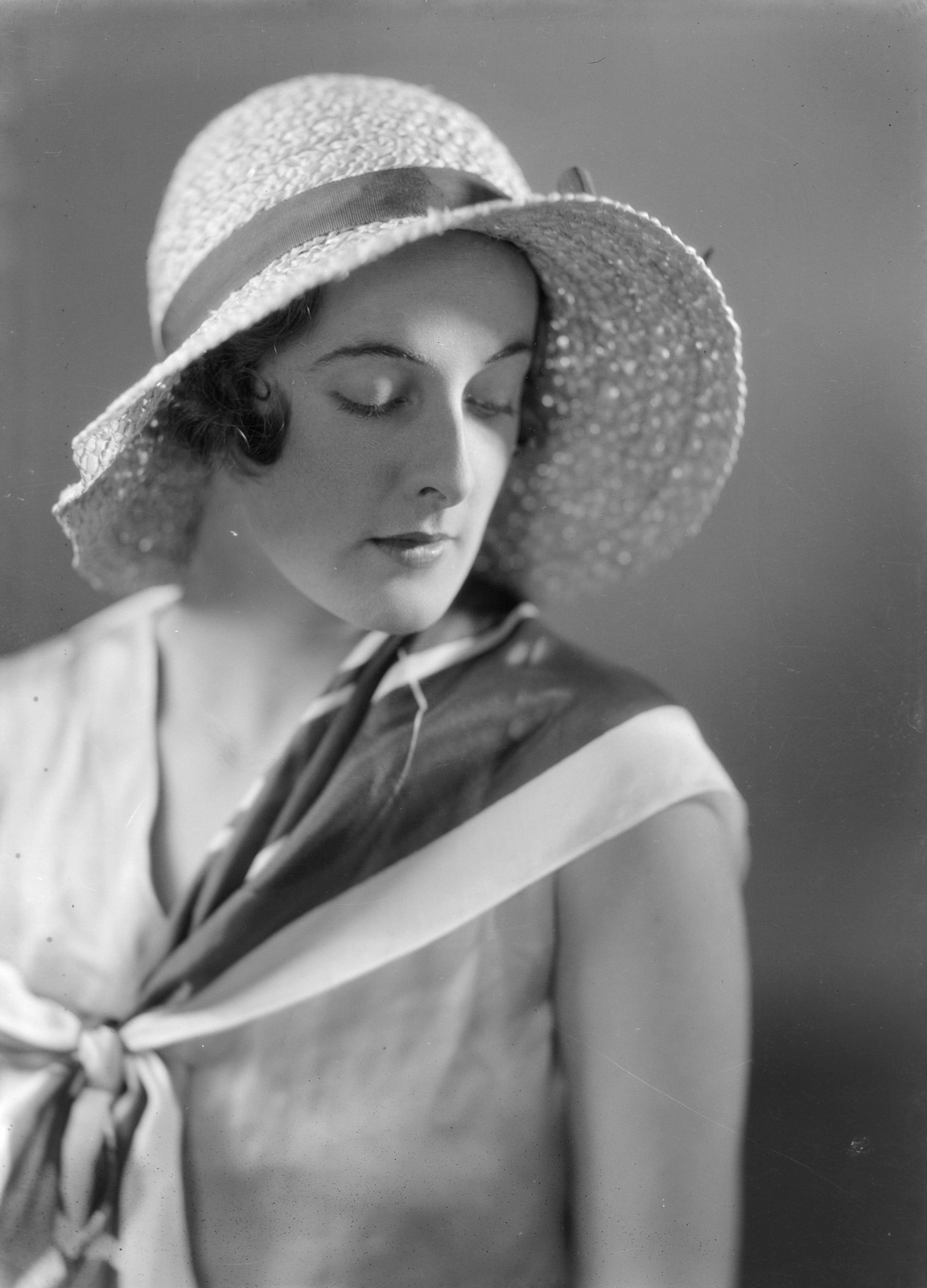
Miss Moira Rodgers

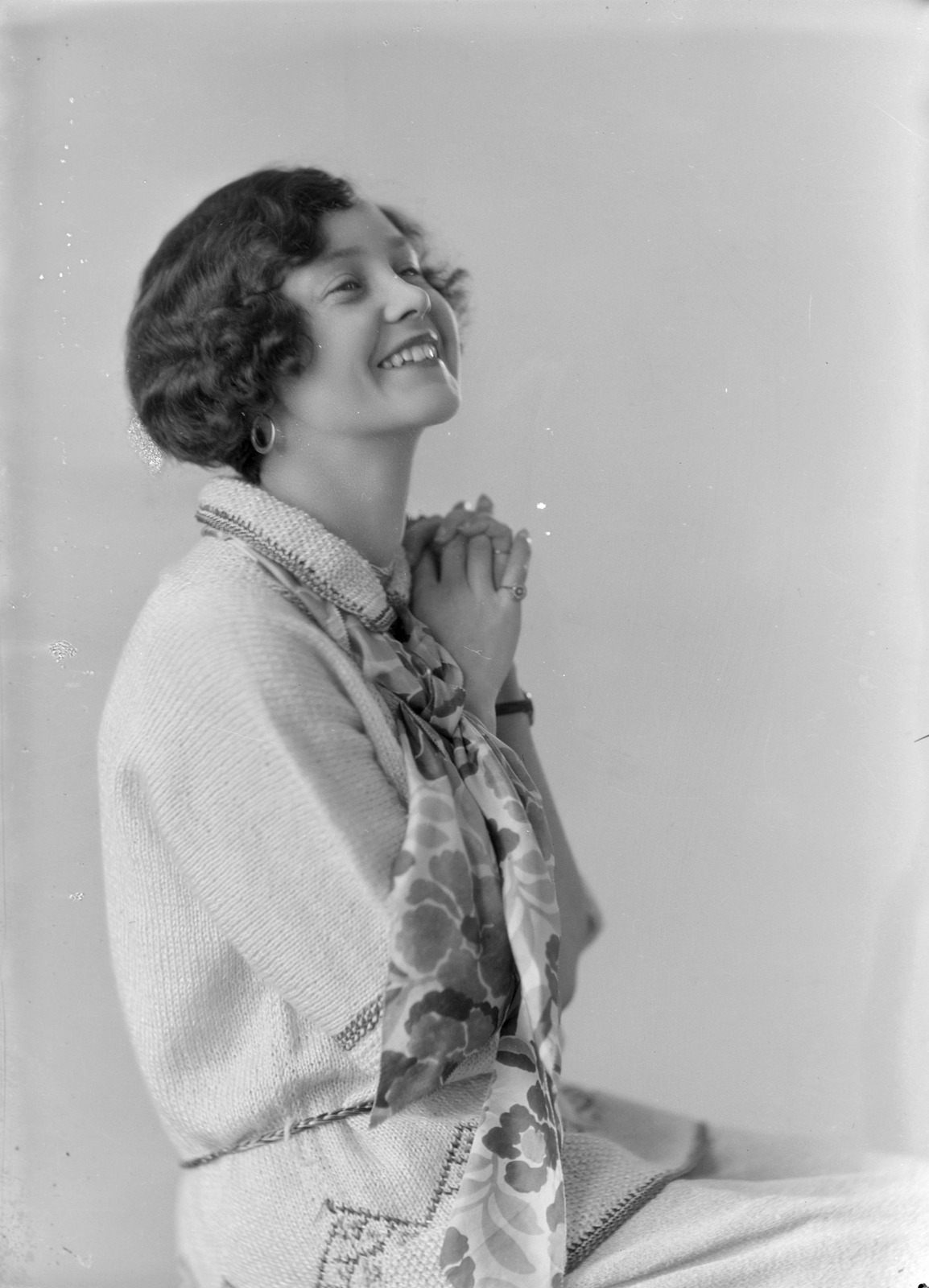
Miss J Purves-Smith

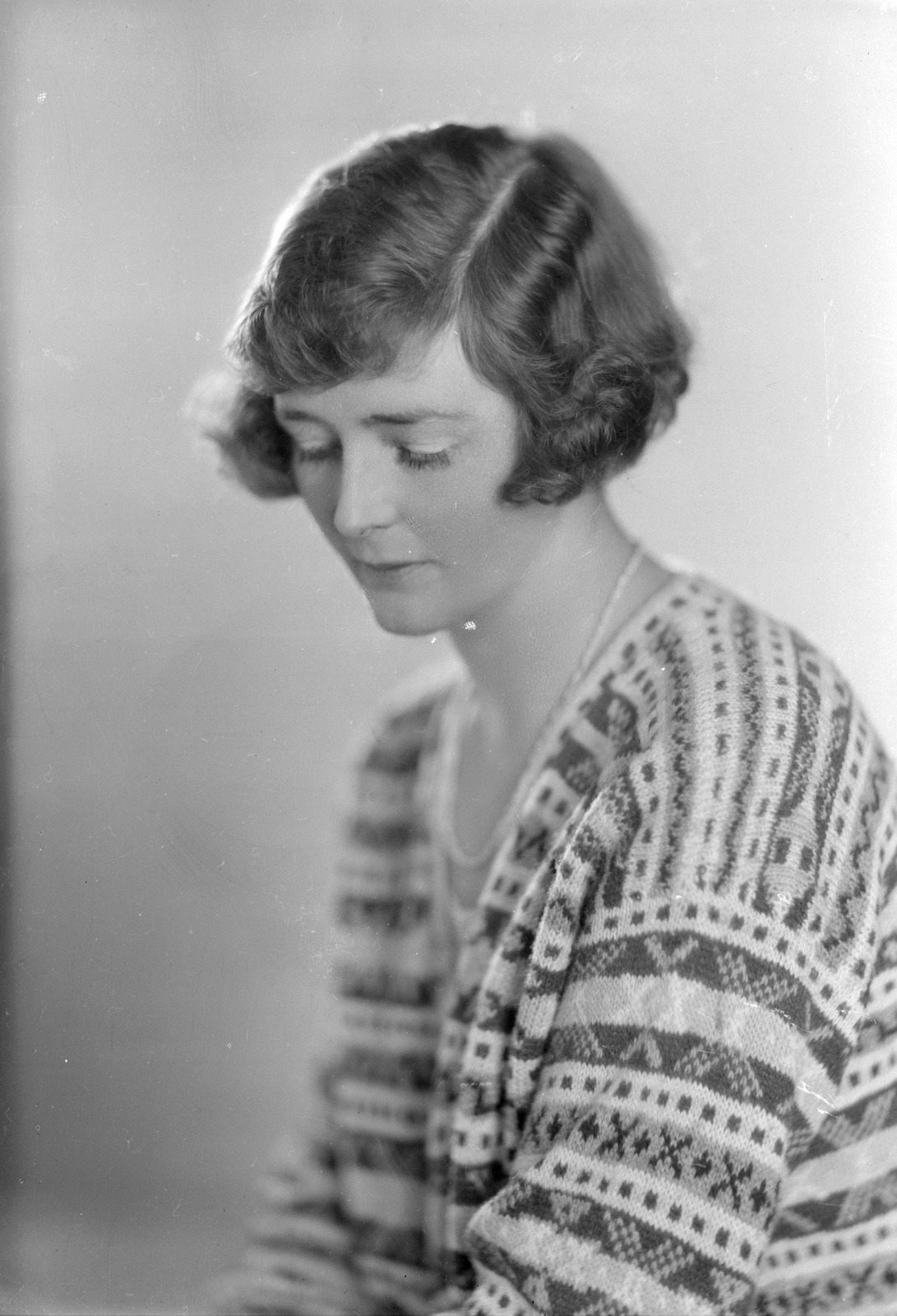
Mrs. Esmond Lillies
Images courtesy of Ruth Hollick Collection, State Library Victoria.
