= Edmund la Touche Armstrong =

Australian librarian and historian

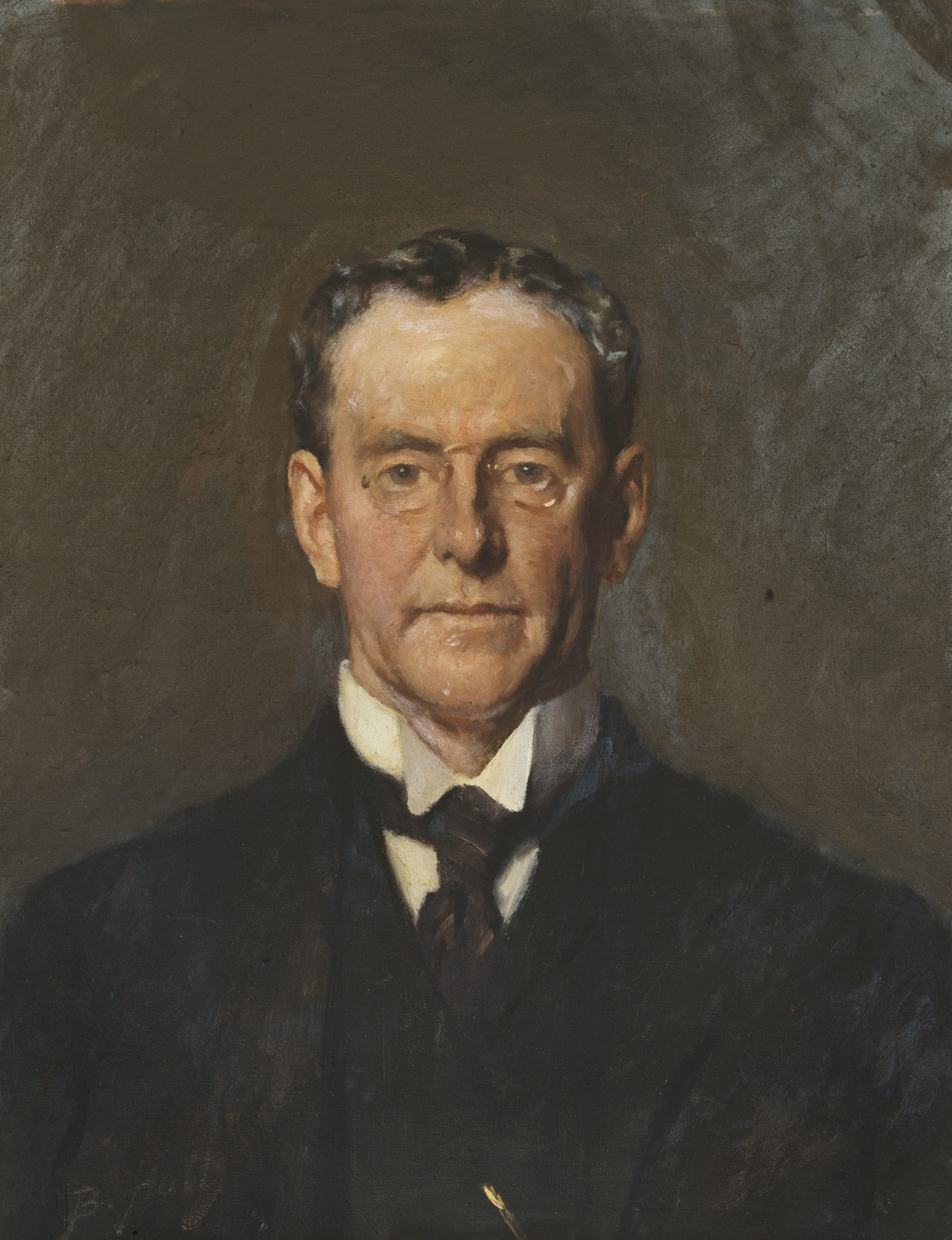
- Edmund la Touche Armstrong, by Lindsay Bernard Hall (State Library of Victoria)
- Born: 1864
- Died: 1946 (aged 81–82)
- Occupation: historian librarian

Edmund la Touche Armstrong (1864–1946) was an Australian historian and librarian.

He was chief librarian of the Public Library of Victoria, afterwards known as the State Library of Victoria.
