= Edmund John Armstrong =

Irish poet

Edmund John Armstrong (1841–1865), was an Irish poet, writing in English and Neo-Latin.

== Life ==
Armstrong was born in Dublin 23, July 1841. As a boy, he was distinguished because of his adventurous spirit, romantic temper united with humour and love of frolic, and his passionate delight in music and literature. Long rambles among the Dublin and Wicklow mountains gave inspiration and colour to his verse. At the age of seventeen or eighteen his religious faith yielded before turbulent moods of scepticism; a disappointment in love added to the gloom of this period.

In 1859 he entered Trinity College, Dublin, distinguishing himself highly by his compositions in Greek and Latin verse. Immoderate work and intellectual excitement in the spring of 1860 were followed by severe illness; a blood-vessel in the lung burst, and the lung seriously injured. A summer of convalescence was passed in Wicklow, and then he found it possible to trace back his way towards Christian beliefs. He spent the winter of 1860–61, in Jersey — a joyous and fruitful season for him, during which much was seen, felt, and thought. Here began a long correspondence on religious questions with a friend as yet unseen, G. A. Chadwick. Having returned from a delightful visit to Brittany, he left Jersey reluctantly in midsummer 1861, and spent the warmer months of the year in Ireland. On the approach of winter he again returned to Jersey, now accompanied by a younger brother, G. F. Armstrong (professor of English literature at Queen's College, Cork).

In April 1862 the brothers started for Normandy, thence visited Paris, and once more returned to Jersey, to bid it a final farewell. Armstrong had now sufficiently recovered to accept a tutorship in the north of Ireland. During his vacation in the summer of 1862, he walked much among the Wicklow mountains, and Avas engaged in writing his poems, "The Dargle" and "landalough". In October 1862, now looking forward to the clerical profession, he continued his college course. In April 1863 he read before the Undergraduate Philosophical Society an essay on Shelley, designed partly as a recantation of his earlier antichristian opinions. In May of the same year he was rapidly producing his longest poem, "The Prisoner of Mount Saint Michael", a romantic tale of passion and crime in blank verse, the landscape and local colour having been furnished by Armstrong's wanderings in France. This was followed by the idyllic poem "Ovoca", partly dramatic, partly narrative in form. In October 1863 he came into residence at Trinity College, Dublin, and attracted much attention by speeches delivered before the Historical Society, and essays read before the Undergraduate Philosophical Society. Of this latter society he was elected president, and in October 1864 delivered his opening address, 'On Essayists and Essay-writing.' In the winter his health broke down, and he went to reside at Kingstown, where, after an illness of several weeks, he died, 24 February 1865. He was buried at Monkstown, Dublin.

== Works ==
As a memorial of his genius, his college and other friends published the volume Poems by the late Edmund J. Armstrong (Moxon, 1865). It includes the two longer poems named above, with many lyrical pieces which show much ardour of imagination and mastery of verse. A short memoir by Mr. Chadwick is prefixed. His poems appeared in a new edition, with many added pieces, edited by G. F. Armstrong, in 1877 (The Poetical Works of Edmund J. Armstrong, Longmans, Green, and Co.) At the same time, and by the same publishers, were issued a volume of his prose (Essays and Sketches by Edmund J. Armstrong, edited by G. F. Armstrong), including essays on Coleridge, Shelley, Goethe's Mephistopheles, E. A. Poe, essayists and essay-writing, etc. In the Life and Letters of Edmund J. Armstrong, edited by G. F. Armstrong (1877), a portrait is given. An article on Armstrong, by Sir Henry Taylor, appeared in the Edinburgh Review of July 1878.
