= Melbourne Society of Women Painters and Sculptors =

Australian visual art organisation

- Formation: 1902
- Headquarters: Melbourne, Australia
- Website: mswps.com.au

The Melbourne Society of Women Painters and Sculptors, established in Melbourne, Victoria in 1902, is the oldest surviving women's art group in Australia.

== History ==
The Melbourne Society of Women Painters and Sculptors (MSWPS) began in 1902 as a monthly gathering of eight former students of Frederick McCubbin from the National Gallery School which members called the Students' Art Club. It is known that among these founders were Daisy Stone, Tina Gowdie, Annie Gates, Kate Allan, Ella Thorn, Henrietta Maria Gulliver and a Miss Stock (otherwise unidentified, who died in 1906). In 1905 they added the indigenous word "Woomballano" (meaning either 'everlasting beauty' or 'search for beauty') to identify their Art Club, changing its title to The Women's Art Club in 1913 then to the Melbourne Society of Women Painters in 1930. The present designation was adopted in 1954.

Many of its early members were plein air painters and identified with the Heidelberg School, which was regarded widely as a male group but which involved many women. The interest in the decorative arts at the opening of the twentieth century attracted other members who were significant craftspeople. By the 1920s, the Society was assimilating the generation of professional women artists emerging from the Melbourne National Gallery School, with significant women artists, representatives of both the Meldrum tonal school and modernism, being invited to join. The Society was less overtly feminist than its Sydney counterpart The Society of Women Painters (later named Women’s Industrial Arts Society) which was founded in 1910 in reaction to the discrimination of male-dominated juries of art institutions and societies. During the Second World War the MSWPS opened volunteer headquarters at Grosvenor Chambers (9 Collins Street, Melbourne) where they made and sold handcrafts and art to raise money for the war effort.

MSWPS has met at heritage-listed Ola Cohn House 41-43 Gipps Street, East Melbourne since the sculptor's death in 1964. She was President of the Society from 1948 to 1964.

== Notable members ==
Melbourne Society of Women Painters and Sculptors members included:

- Cristina Asquith Baker, painter, print-maker (1868–1960)
- Alice Marian Ellen Bale (1875–1955), Studied at National Gallery School 1895–1904, from 1917 to 1955 a consistent exhibitor with the Women’s Art Club
- Margaret Francis Ellen Baskerville sculptor (1861–1930)
- Clarice Beckett (1887–1935) participated in Women’s Art Club shows until the early 1930s.
- Lina Bryans (1909–2000), exhibited 1940–1965 and prominent in the 1960s, resigned 1966, rejoined 1991—. A Modernist associated with William Frater
- Ethel Carrick (1872–1952), exhibited with the society in the 1940s and 1950s
- Ola Cohn (President of the Society from 1948 to her death in 1964)
- Amalie Sara Colquhoun painter (1894–1974)
- Valeria Helen Correll, sculptor, ceramicist (1886–1973)
- Sybil Craig (a foundation member)
- Peggie Crombie
- Janet Cumbrae Stewart
- Maude Edith Victoria Fleay (1869–1965), Women’s Art Club member from 1929, exhibited with it regularly and was elected a life member in 1964.
- Frances Margot Freeman (1895–1977) exhibited with the Melbourne Society of Women Painters and Sculptors in 1923–26, then again in 1938, and regularly showed work in their annual exhibitions until 1971
- May Butler George (1881–1973), painter and sculptor, joined the Melbourne Society of Women Painters and Sculptors 1913 and exhibited with it in 1923
- Gwendolyn Muriel Grant (1877–1968)
- Henrietta Maria Gulliver (1866 – 1945)
- Norah Gurdon (1882 - 1974)
- Margaret Gurney
- Pat Hillcoat (1935 – 2022)
- Polly Hurry
- Marguerite Henriette Mahood, ceramicist (1901–1989)
- Maidie McGowan (1906–1998)
- Leopoldine Mimovich OAM (1920–2019)
- Anne Montgomery
- Hilda Rix Nicholas
- Helen Elizabeth Ogilvie (1902–1992)
- Esther Paterson (1892–1971) President 1966
- Margaret Pestell (1894–1984)
- Ada May Plante (1875–1950)
- Jane Rebecca Price (1860– 1948)
- Elma Roach (1897-1942)
- Florence Aline Rodway (1881–1971), showed occasionally with the MSWPS, but was more closely associated with the Society of Women Painters in Sydney, before she moved to Hobart, she was a foundation member of the SWP in 1910 and a member of the exhibition committee in 1910–12
- Dora Serle (1875–1968) president of the Melbourne Society of Women Painters in 1933–34 and represented them on the National Council of Women .
- Clara Southern (1860–1940)
- Isabel May Tweddle (1875–1945)
- Dora Wilson (1883 – 1946)
- Eveline Winifred Syme (1888–1961)
- Stephanie Taylor (1899–1974)
- Violet Teague (1872–1951)
- Jessie Constance Alicia Traill (1881–1967)
- Isabel May Tweddle (1875–1945) joined the Women's Art Club in 1926, president 1930–31 and 1941–45.
- Janie Wilkinson Whyte (1869–1953) member 1909–1952, president 1921–22
- Dora Wilson (1883–1946)
- Marjorie Woolcock (1898–1965)

== Selected artworks ==
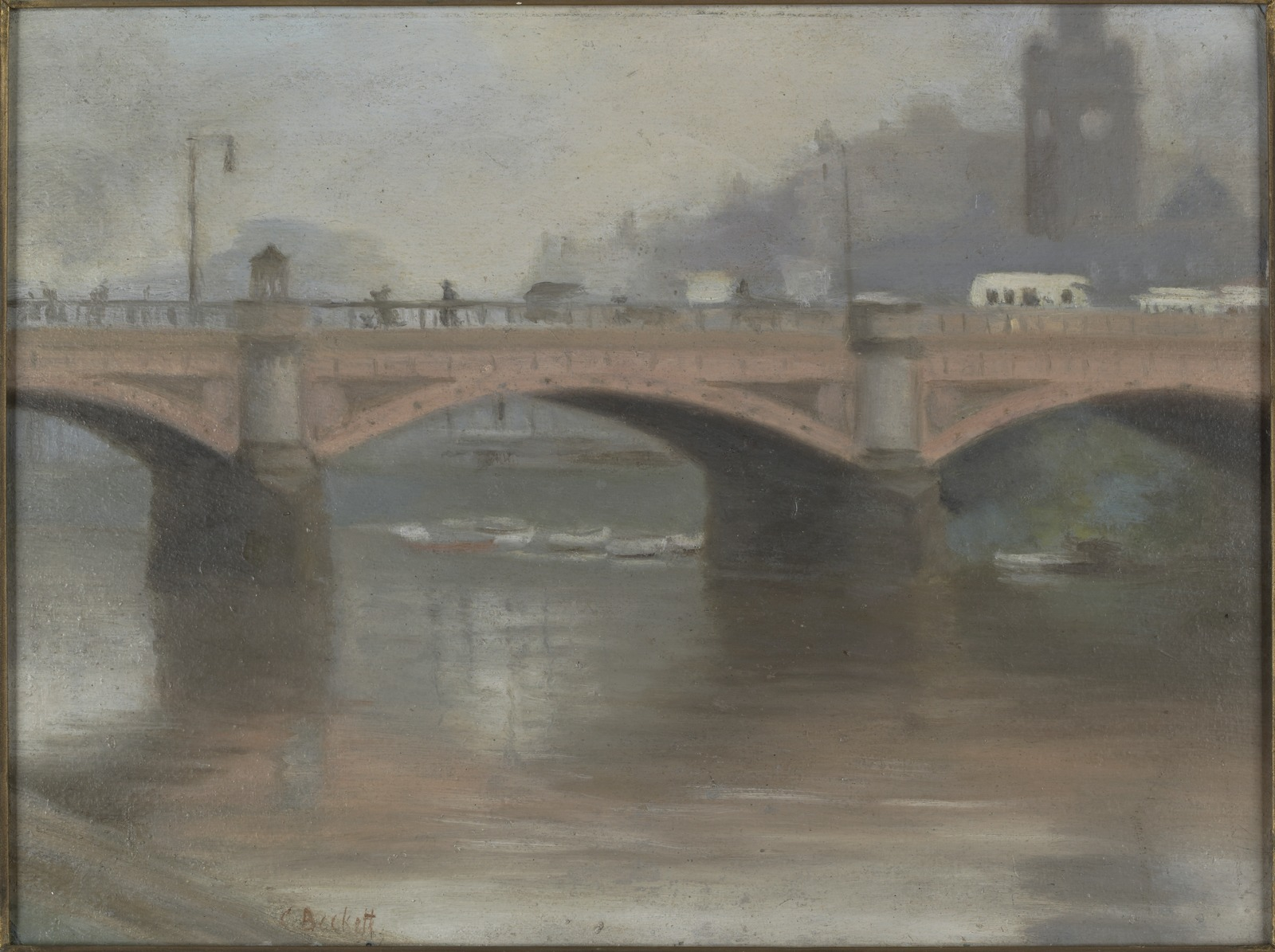
Princes Bridge, Clarice Beckett, State Library Victoria

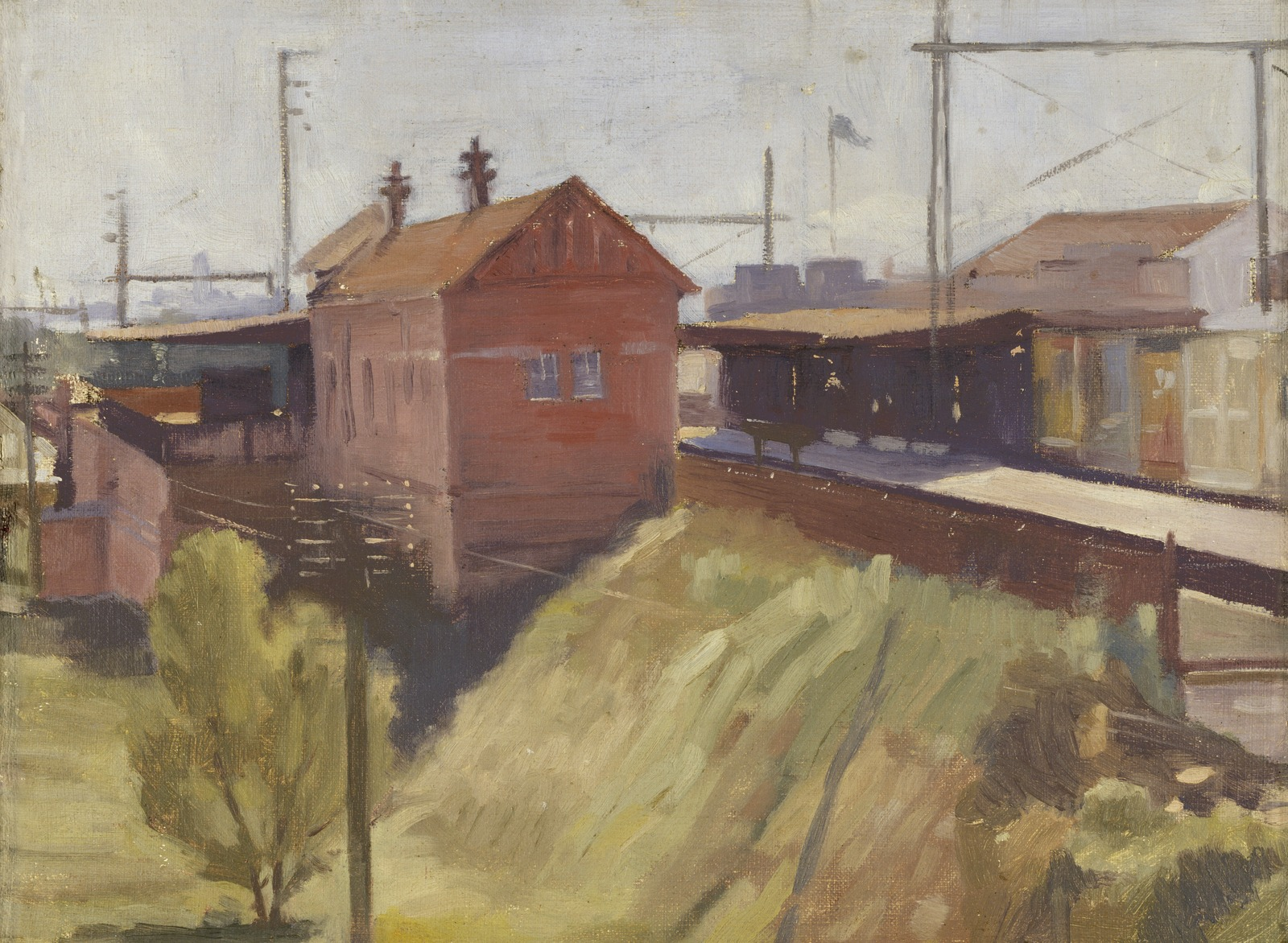
Railway Station, Ada May Plante, State Library Victoria

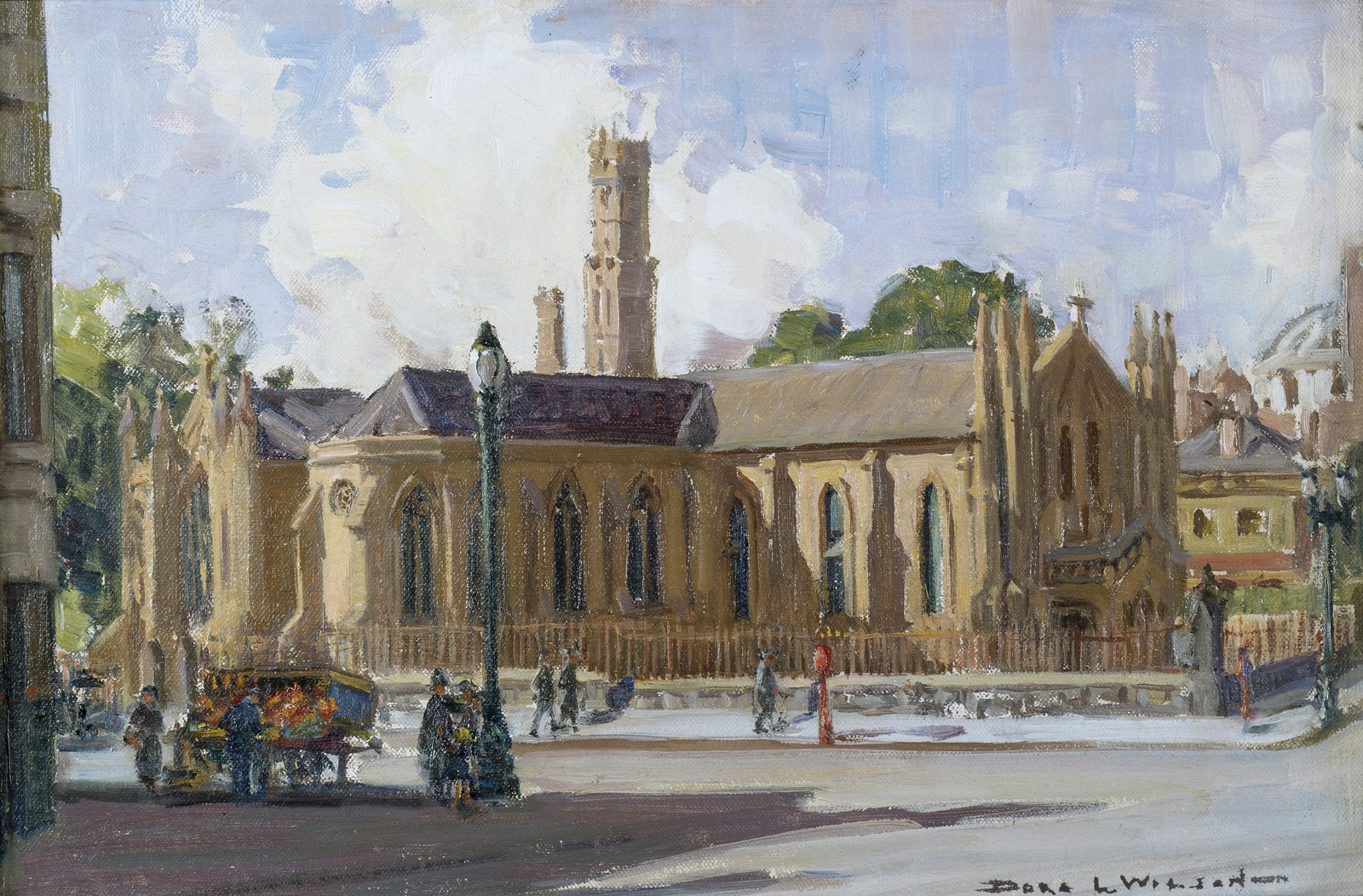
St Francis' Church, Melbourne, Dora Wilson, State Library Victoria

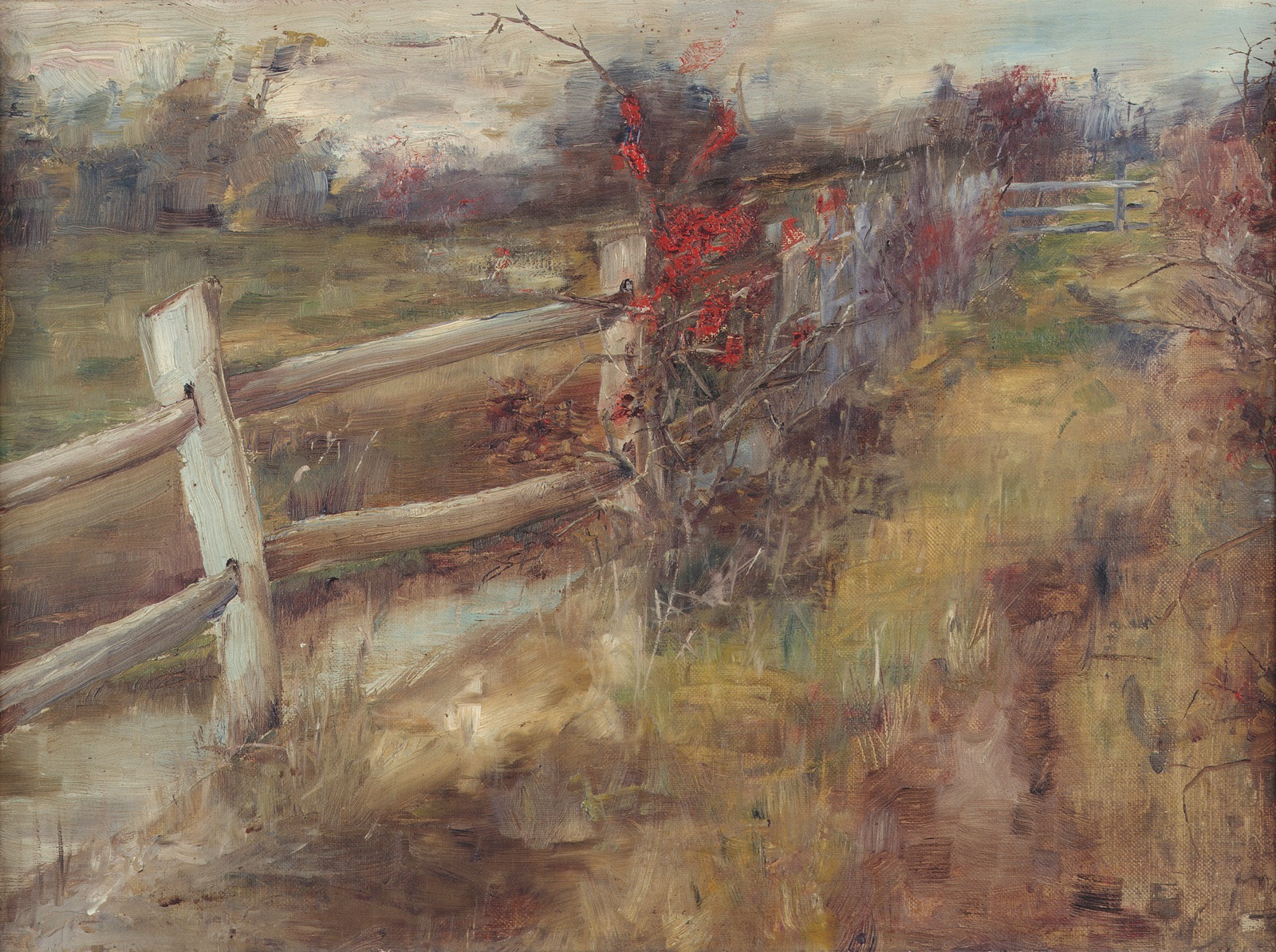
The Hawthorn Path, Henrietta Maria Gulliver, State Library Victoria
