= Janie Wilkinson Whyte =

Australian artist (1869–1953)

- Born: 1869; Melbourne
- Died: 7 April 1953; Canterbury
- Occupations: Painter, etcher, wood carver

Janie Wilkinson Whyte (1869–1953) was an Australian impressionist artist and part of the first wave of feminist artists in Melbourne.

== Biography ==
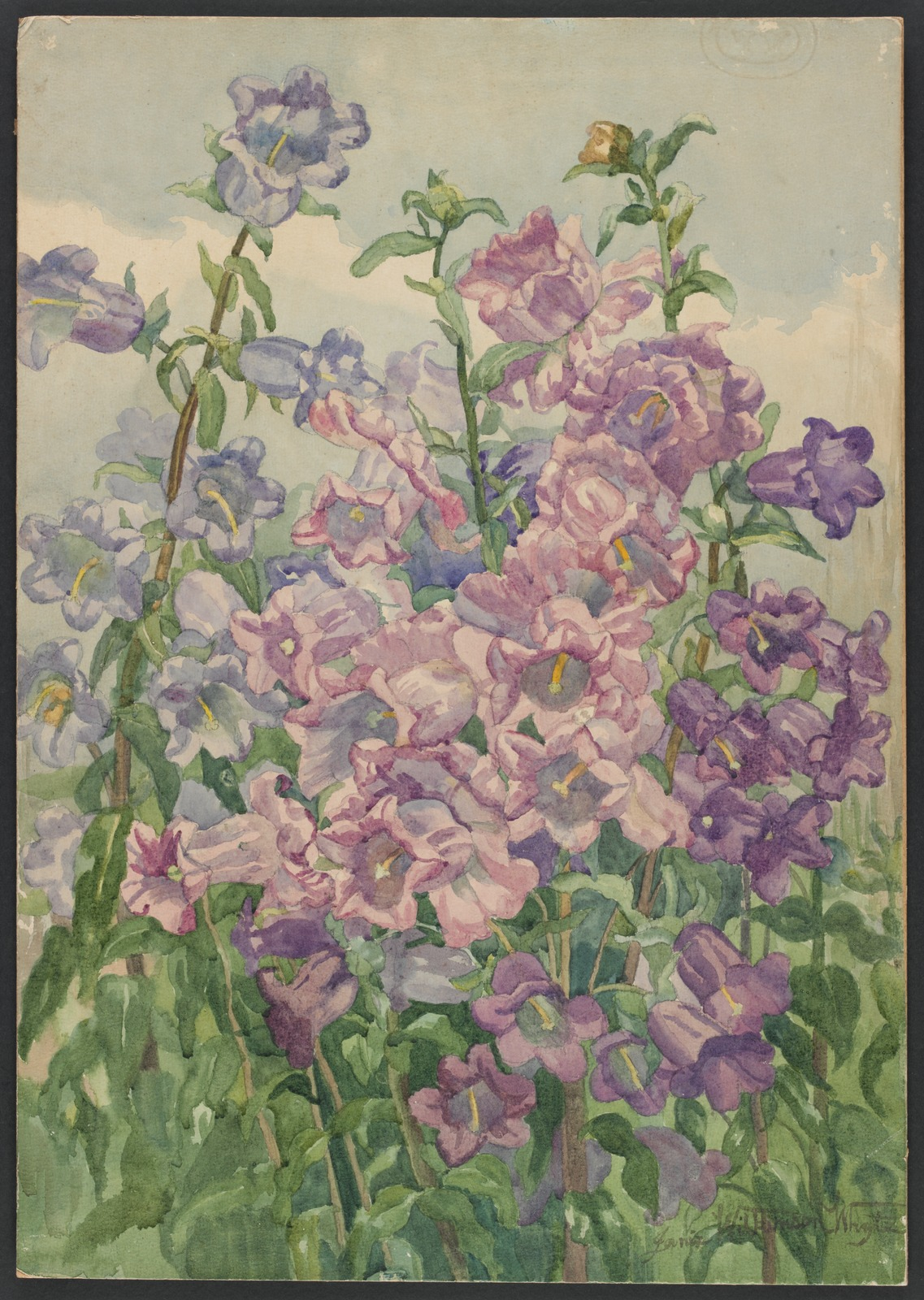
Canterbury bell flowers, ca. 1921–1930, State Library Victoria

Whyte was a painter, etcher, and wood-carver who studied at the National Gallery School from 1890–1895 and together with Dora Wilson and Jessie Traill took lessons in etching from John Mather. Their etchings were published in The Lone Hand in 1907 as some of the earliest works in this field made by women. Whyte was an impressionist artist who painted portraits, figure studies, and landscapes, and was one of the first Melbourne women to paint dockyard scenes. She also painted interiors and flowers, and worked with oils, watercolours, and pastels. Her cityscapes contained charming observations of Melbourne life. Whyte taught at the Sydenham College and Ipswich Girls Grammar School.

As part of a first wave of feminist artists in Melbourne, Whyte presented a paper at women's cultural group the Austral Salon along with Violet Teague in August 1907. While a copy of her lecture was not archived it is said she discussed the struggle for Australian women artists to get recognition.

Whyte joined the Melbourne Society of Women Painters and Sculptors (MSWPS) in 1909, served on its committee and was president in 1921–1922. She maintained her membership until 1952. She showed with the MSWPS in the 1920s.

Whyte died on 7 April 1953 at her home in Canterbury, Victoria, and was cremated. She was survived by a sister and numerous nieces and nephews.
