= Janet Cumbrae Stewart =

Australian painter

- Self-portrait, 1911
- Born: Janet Agnes Stewart; 23 December 1883; Melbourne, Victoria, Australia
- Died: 8 September 1960 (aged 76); Melbourne
- Known for: Painting
- Partner: Miss Argemore ffarington "Bill" Bellairs

Janet Agnes Cumbrae Stewart (23 December 1883 – 8 September 1960) was an Australian painter. She spent the 1920s and 1930s painting in Britain, France and Italy.

== Biography ==
Cumbrae Stewart was born on 23 December 1883 in Brighton, Victoria, Australia. She was born Janet Agnes Stewart, the youngest of ten children born to Francis Edward Stewart (1833–1904) and Agnes Park (1843–1927). Janet's eldest brother, Francis William Sutton Stewart, became convinced of a family connection to the Stuarts of Bute and despite never proving the link, adopted "Cumbrae" to his name, and his siblings followed suit. This addition to the name would later serve a greater purpose for Janet, who quickly abandoned the hyphen and identified herself professionally as simply Cumbrae Stewart, and so avoided, to a certain extent, the limitations and scrutiny attached to her sex.

The Stewarts lived a very traditional upper middle class existence, with the boys studying at private school and the three girls receiving their early education at home under the supervision of a governess. As well as her lessons, Cumbrae Stewart also received instruction in several suitable 'past-times' including dancing, piano and drawing; this latter she was instructed by Zena Beatrice Selwyn, who would later marry Cumbrae Stewart's brother Francis in 1906. During her late teens, Cumbrae Stewart joined landscape painter, John Mather, and his students, on outdoor sketching exhibitions.

From 1903 though 1908 Cumbrae Stewart studied at the Melbourne National Gallery School, where she was taught by Lindsay Bernard Hall and Frederick McCubbin. During this time she won a slew of awards: first prize for Drawing from Antique in 1904, Still Life Painting in 1905, Second place for Half Nude Painting and Life Drawing in 1906, and third prize for Drawing a Head from Life in 1903 and third place in the coveted Travelling Scholarship prize in 1908 for The Old Gown in 1908 (first and second places were both awarded to Constance Jenkins).

Following her art education, Cumbrae Stewart rented premises in Melbourne and commenced exhibiting. She participated in the first Exhibition of Women's Work held in Melbourne in 1907, and exhibited with the Victorian Artists Society from 1908 to 1920. She also exhibited with the Queensland Art Society, the Australian Artists Association and the South Australian Society of Arts, as well as the Melbourne Society of Women Painters and Sculptors. She held her first solo exhibition at the Coles Book Arcade gallery in Collins Street in 1911, from which Bernard Hall purchased a pastel of a head, and Rupert Bunny purchased a landscape. Other solo exhibitions were regularly held at the Athenaeum Hall in Melbourne, Gayfield Shaw's Salon in Sydney and Preece's Gallery in South Australia, under the management of Gayfield Shaw.

In 1922 Cumbrae Stewart travelled to England with her sister, Beatrice Peverill, on board the Aeneas, arriving in Liverpool on 21 July. In an interview with the Brisbane Telegraph, Beatrice reports on a journey during which her sister was kept extremely busy with commissions from fellow passengers, working from a small studio space created by the ship's captain, below the bridge. The journey apparently concluded with a small exhibition of portraits and travel sketches held in the music room.

Prior to embarking on the journey, Janet had organised for a ship to carry over a selection of works with which she intended to commence immediate exhibition. Upon its arrival however, she was devastated to find that the vast majority had been destroyed in transit and she had to quickly set about replacing them, and so finding a studio became an immediate priority. She held her first solo exhibition in February 1923 at Walkers Galleries in London. (Note: Perhaps Walker Galleries, Harrogate) This was a tremendous success financially and socially. Several prominent London society ladies turned out to view the works and Cumbrae Stewart was kept immediately busy thereafter with commissions. Reports also suggest that Queen Mary herself attended her 1924 exhibition and complimented Cumbrae Stewart on her achievement and personally selected a pastel, described by the Royal Collection Trust as "A young woman seated on a bed." This work remains within the Royal Collection today and is inscribed on the reverse in the Queen's own handwriting. Cumbrae Stewart lived and worked in Chelsea until 1928, during which time she had works accepted for exhibition at the Salon des Artistes Francais in Paris, receiving honourable mention for Noonday Rest, 1919, as well as the Royal Society of Portrait Painters, the Royal Glasgow Institute of the Fine Arts, the Royal Academy in London, and the Society of Women Artists, punctuated by several solo exhibitions at the Beaux Arts Gallery in London. She also represented Australia at the British Empire Exhibition at Wembley in 1924 and the New Zealand and South Seas Exhibition in Dunedin in 1926.

During this time, she continued to regularly hold solo exhibitions in Melbourne, Sydney, Brisbane and South Australia. The subject of her painting over this period suggests Cumbrae Stewart travelled around the UK and Brittany in 1924 and across to Avignon in 1925, then on through Italy in 1926. Upon her return to Australia, she told The Bulletin that she travelled alone in Europe, avoiding the express trains whenever possible, opting instead for the slower goods trains so she could better enjoy the scenery.

Records show that Cumbrae Stewart moved her studio to Italy in around 1929. This decision may have come as result of the Depression which was starting to severely impact England at this time. Although she very likely continued to paint during this period, exhibition activity dwindled, likely also as a result also of the Depression, which was also effecting Australia by this time. Records from 1932 saw her residing in Laigueglia Italy, and a report in the Brisbane Courier mentions an exhibition of her work held during this time at the Casa d'artisti, an art gallery located in Milan. One of her landscapes was purchased by the Museo del Novecento and remains in their collection today. The Argus also reports her having a studio in Alassio near Florence prior to this.

In 1934, Cumbrae Stewart moved on to Villeneuve outside Avignon. In an interview published in The Australian, Cumbrae Stewart speaks of an atmosphere of ill-will toward the English after the Abyssinian War and brewing tensions under Mussolini may have underpinned the decision to move. Here she lived in an old mansion, perched high on a hill overlooking Avignon and the Rhône.

Cumbrae Stewart's final European exhibition fittingly took place at Walker's Gallery in 1936, the venue for her first London solo exhibition, though celebrations were marred by Hitler's occupation of the Rhine. Cumbrae Stewart reported that all attendees, including herself, wore black in mourning for King George. The fact that she attended the exhibition, suggests that perhaps she had left Avignon for the safety of England, certainly the following year saw her returning to Australia in the company of Miss Argemore ffarrington "Bill" Bellairs, on board the Dutch ship Meliskerk from Antwerp, setting foot on Australian soil for the first time in 14 years on the 5th February 1937.

By that time, Cumbrae Stewart was 54 years old and after a short stay with her sister in Brighton, was living with Bellairs and sharing their time between 4 Margaret Street, South Yarra and her property, "Wanna", at Hurstbridge. After returning home, Cumbrae Stewart held only two more solo exhibitions before her death in 1960, both at Velasquez Gallery in Melbourne. The first was held in 1942 and the other in 1947. Reviews of the 1947 exhibition suggest that her subjects included figures, landscapes, and flower studies though those mentioned hailed from her early career, and later reports of the 1942 exhibition state that Cumbrae Stewart was firmly against any form of promotion and so nobody knew it was on. The Brighton Southern Cross writes that Cumbrae Stewart continued working up until her death, painting portraits of well-known people including members of the Baillieu family. Her last painting is believed to be that of her nephew, Ean, which was completed just prior to her death. Cumbrae Stewart died on 8 September 1960 in Melbourne.

== Legacy ==
Cumbrae Stewart's work is today held in the State collections of Victoria, New South Wales, South Australia and Queensland, the National Gallery of Australia, and several regional galleries including the Mornington Peninsula Regional Gallery and the Bendigo Art Gallery. It is also held in the Royal Collection in London and the Museo del Novecento in Milan. Despite this, and the enormous success and respect she obtained during her lifetime, few are on permanent display, indeed most have not been seen in the public domain for many decades. Interest in her work has been somewhat renewed in recent years as a result of the industry's drive to write female artists back into the Australian art-historic narrative. Most recently, several examples were included in Bayside Gallery's Her Own Path exhibition, held in 2021 in celebration of the early female artists of Bayside, and a pivotal major retrospective of her work was held at the Mornington Peninsula Regional Gallery in 2003 under the curatorship of Rodney James. In 2017–2018 her work was also included in the Australian National Trust show Intrepid Women – Australian women artists in Paris 1900–1950 held in 2017–2018.
