= Lindsay Bernard Hall =

English painter (1859–1935)

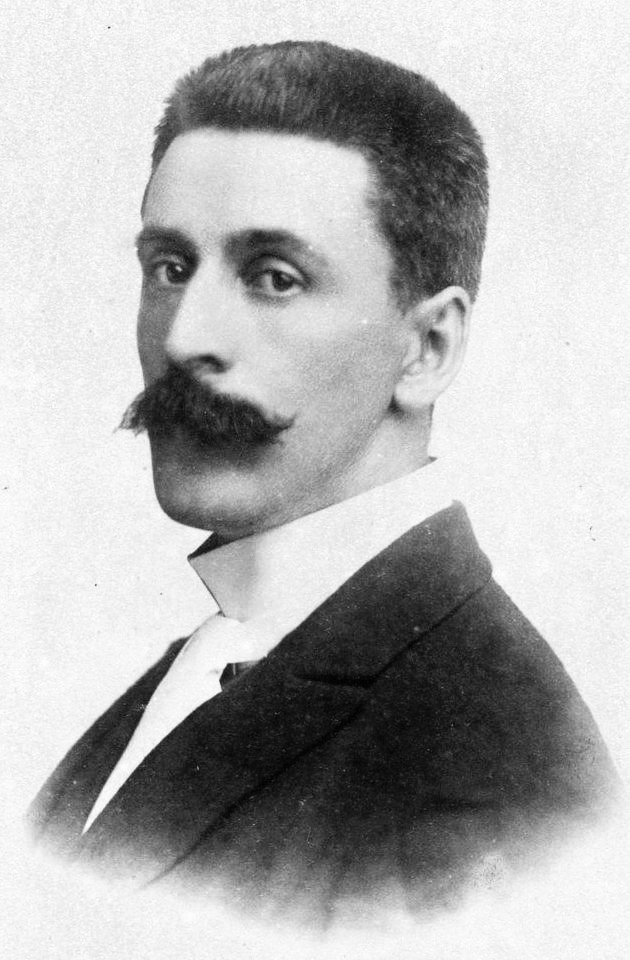
- Born: 28 December 1859; Garston, Liverpool, England
- Died: 14 February 1935 (aged 75); London, England
- Resting place: Golders Green Cemetery, London
- Known for: Director, National Gallery of Victoria (43 years)
- Spouse(s): Elsinore Mary Shuter; Harriet Grace Thomson

Signature
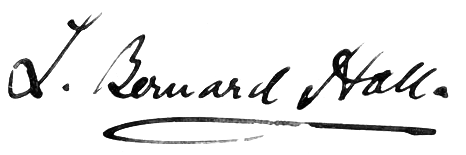

Lindsay Bernard Hall (28 December 1859 – 14 February 1935) was an English-born Australian artist, teacher and art gallery director.

== Early life and career ==
Hall was born at Garston, Liverpool, England. Hall was educated at Cheltenham College. He studied painting at the South Kensington School of Art, Antwerp and Munich, and worked for several years in London.

He was one of the original members of the New English Art Club. He exhibited with the club in 1886 and 1887, along with Clausen, Sargent, Gotch, Kennington and others.

On the death of George Frederick Folingsby in 1891, he was appointed director of the National Gallery of Victoria and master of the School of Arts in Melbourne. He began his duties in March 1892. Hall married Elsinore Mary Shuter on 18 December 1894, however she died in 1901.

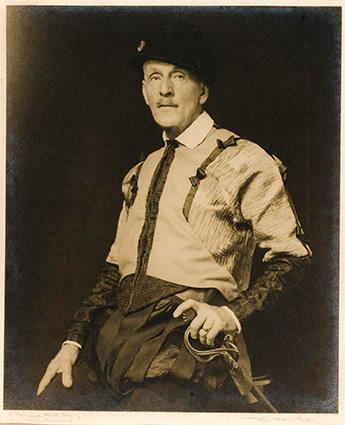
Pegg Clarke (1920s) L. Bernard Hall in his 70s, posed for a tableau in Italian medieval costume with sword. Collection: Castlemaine Art Museum

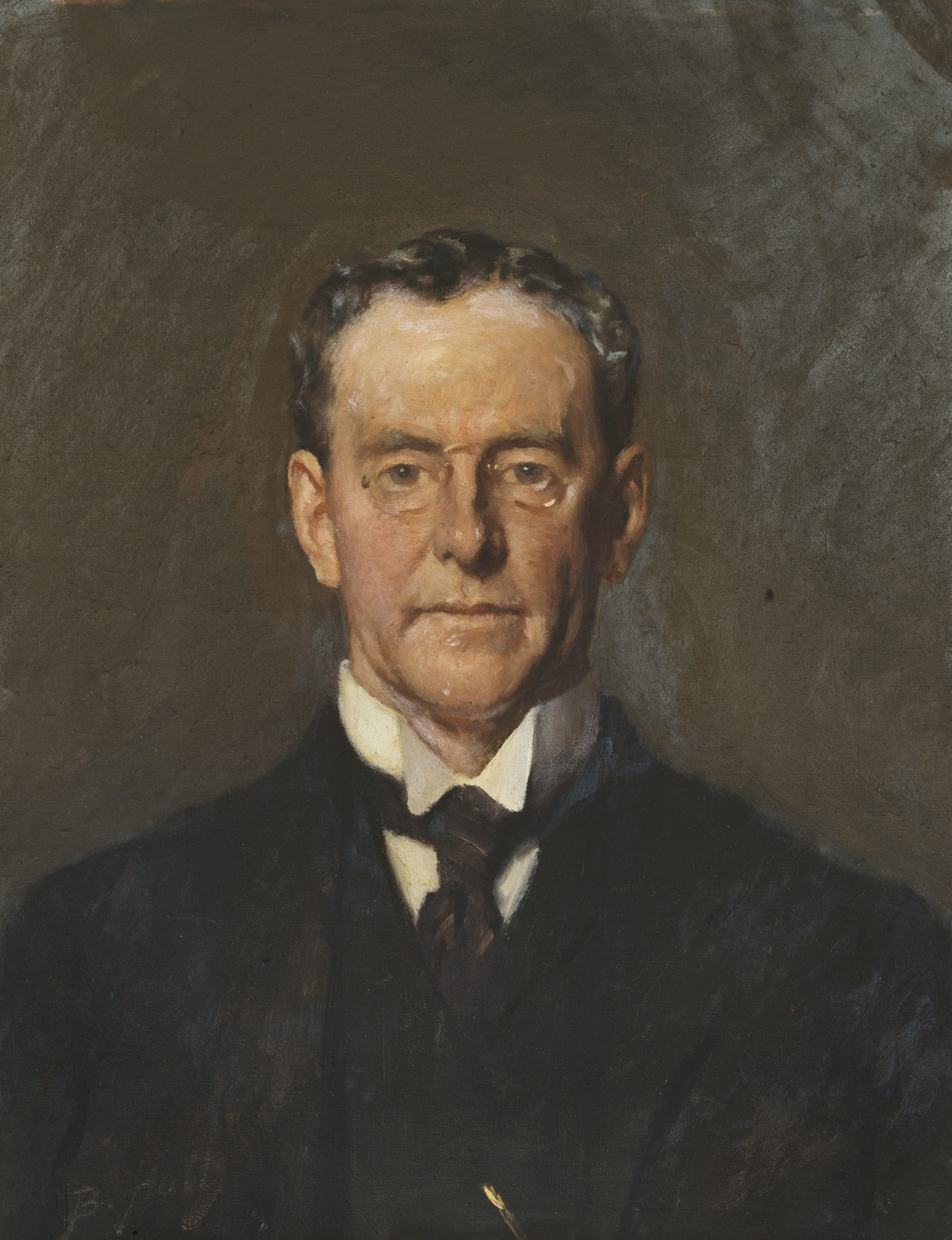
Edmund la Touche Armstrong, c1925, by Lindsay Bernard Hall (State Library of Victoria)

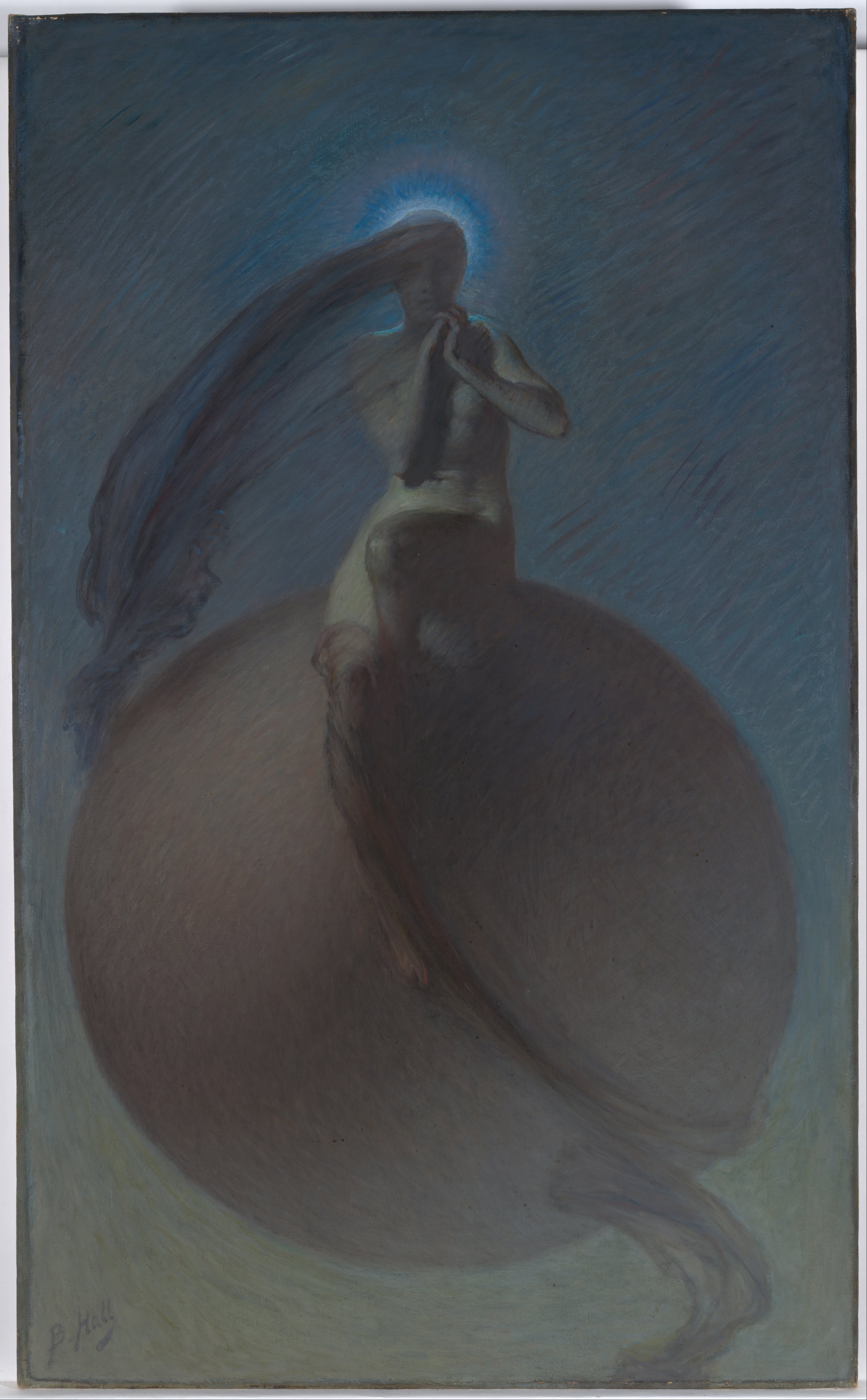
The Quest, c1905, by Lindsay Bernard Hall (National Gallery of Australia)

== Death and burial ==
He died in London on 14 February 1935 and was buried at Golders Green cemetery. Among those in attendance were Australian artists George Bell, I.M. Cohen, James Quinn, Bess Tait and Marion Jones as well as British sculptors Gilbert Bayes and Lady Hilton Young.
