= Australian War Memorial =

National war memorial and museum in Canberra, Australia

- Australian War Memorial Council
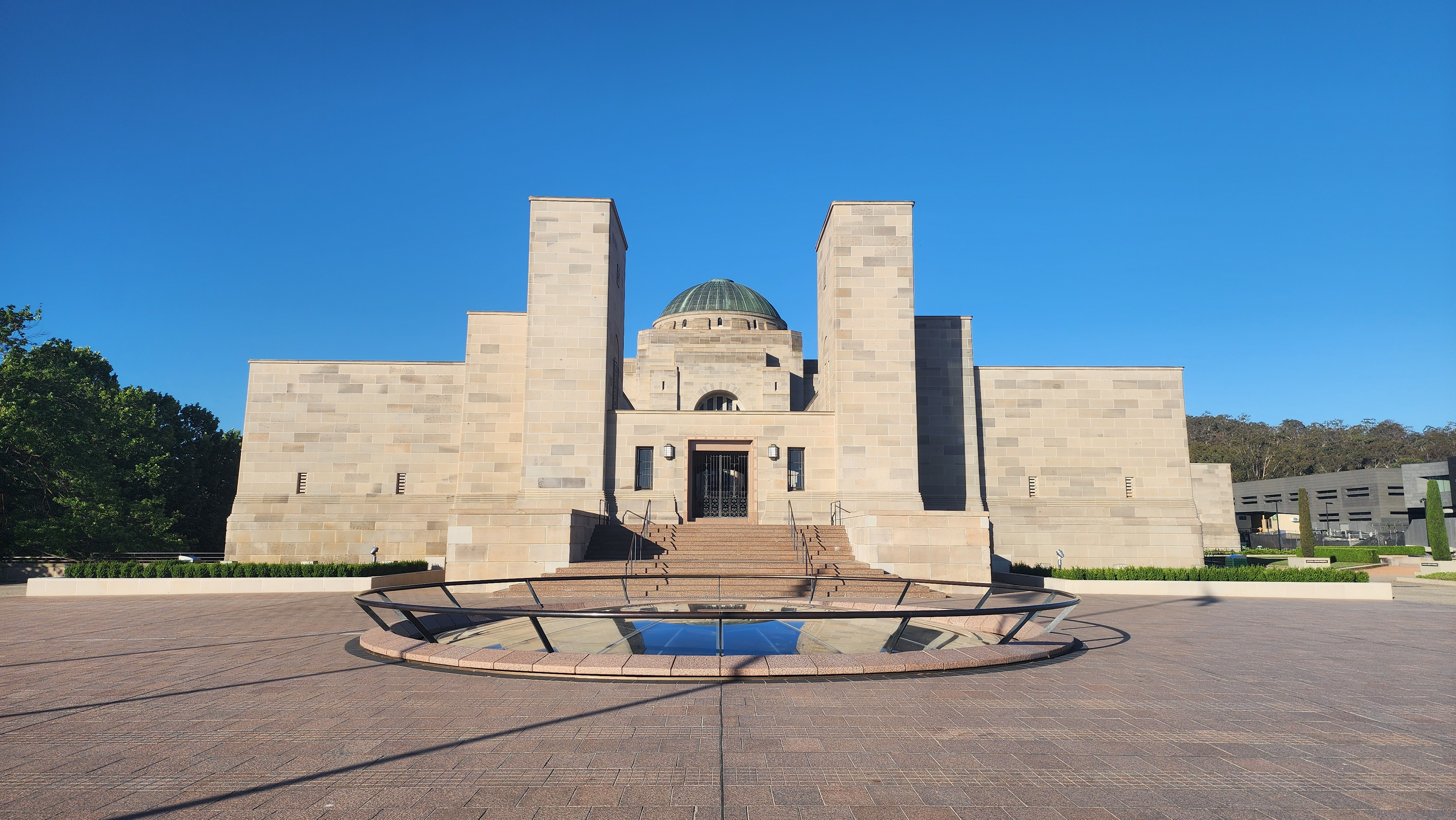
- Memorial Building from the central precinct of the Australian War Memorial, 2026
- For Australians who died as a result of war
- Established: 1925; 101 years ago
- Unveiled: 1941; 85 years ago
- Location: 35°16′50″S 149°08′57″E; Treloar Crescent Campbell, Canberra, Australia
- Designed by: Emil Sodersten and John Crust (Memorial Building); Denton Corker Marshall (Administration Building, ANZAC Hall, CEW Building)

Commonwealth Heritage List
- Official name: Australian War Memorial, Anzac Pde, Campbell, ACT, Australia
- Type: Listed place
- Criteria: A., B., D., E., F., G., H.
- Designated: 22 June 2004; 22 years ago
- Reference no.: 105469

The Australian War Memorial (AWM) is a national war memorial, museum and archive dedicated to all Australians who have died as a result of war, including peacekeeping duties. The AWM is located in Campbell, a suburb of the Australian capital city of Canberra. The grounds include five buildings and a sculpture garden. Most of the museum galleries and commemorative areas are contained in the Memorial Building.

Plans to build a national war memorial and museum were initiated shortly after the First World War, with the AWM formally established through federal legislation in 1925. Designs for the AWM were created by Emil Sodersten and John Crust, although the onset of the Great Depression delayed its construction. Work on the Memorial Building progressed in the mid-1930s, and the AWM was officially opened to the public in 1941. Several structures designed by Denton Corker Marshall were built on the grounds from the 1980s to 2000s, to house additional museum exhibits and administrative offices. In 1993, the Tomb of the Unknown Australian Soldier was installed inside the Memorial Building's Hall of Memory.

Although the memorial was initially envisioned to only commemorate those who had died as the result of the First World War, the institution's scope was changed to include service-members of the Second World War in 1939, service-members from all other wars in 1952, and all Australians who died in conflict in 1975. Following a reinterpretation of the legal constraints on the Memorial's scope, the Australian Frontier Wars are to be covered for the first time as part of a gallery planned to open in 2028.

The AWM features galleries dedicated to the World Wars, and thematic exhibits such as the Aircraft Hall and the Hall of Valour. The memorial and museum is open daily excluding Christmas Day. The AWM holds several commemorative services on its grounds, including a nightly Last Post service, and national services for Anzac Day and Remembrance Day.

== History ==
The Australian War Records Section was formed in May 1917 to ensure the preservation of records relating to the First World War. Records and relics were exhibited first in Melbourne and later Canberra.

The idea for a national war memorial to commemorate veterans and to showcase war trophies in the Australian capital was also conceived by Charles Bean a year earlier in 1916. The Commonwealth Government was supportive of Bean's efforts and established an Australian War Memorial committee in 1919. Bean, together with John Treloar, the officer-in-charge of the Australian War Records Section and later the AWM's first director, guided the creation of AWM. A museum to display collected war relics was also incorporated into the institution, with Bean and Treloar believing that the museum was philosophically and operationally inseparable from the memorial.

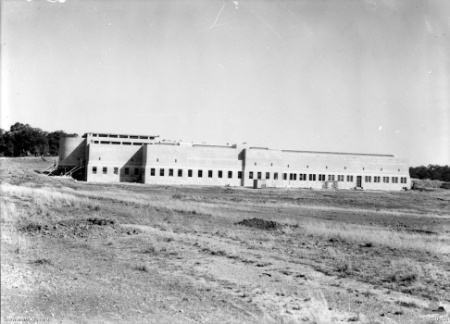
Memorial Building under construction, 1937

In 1923, the Commonwealth Government officially announced its intentions to build a national war memorial, with the AWM being formally established through legislation in 1925. A design competition for a new memorial was held from 1925 to 1926, although no winner was selected as none were able to satisfy the competitions criteria, generally by being too expensive. Instead Emil Sodersten and John Crust were asked to collaborate and create a design that incorporates Sodersten's Art Deco style with Crust's cost-cutting approach. Construction was set to begin in 1929, although its start was delayed due to the onset of the Great Depression. The project's scope was also reduced due to the Depression and a limited budget.

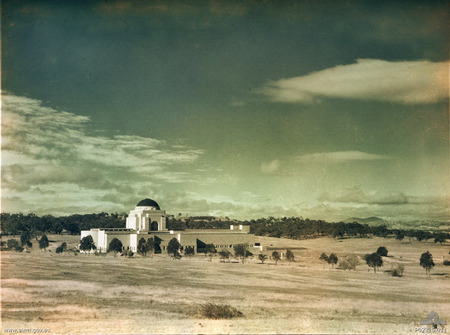
Painting of the Australian War Memorial in 1946, several years after it was opened to the public

By 1934, the "Lone Pine" pine, propagated from a seed brought back from Gallipoli, was planted on the property, and some construction work had started again. By 1935, parts of the Memorial Building were occupied by AWM staff, although the AWM was not officially opened to the public until Remembrance Day in 1941.

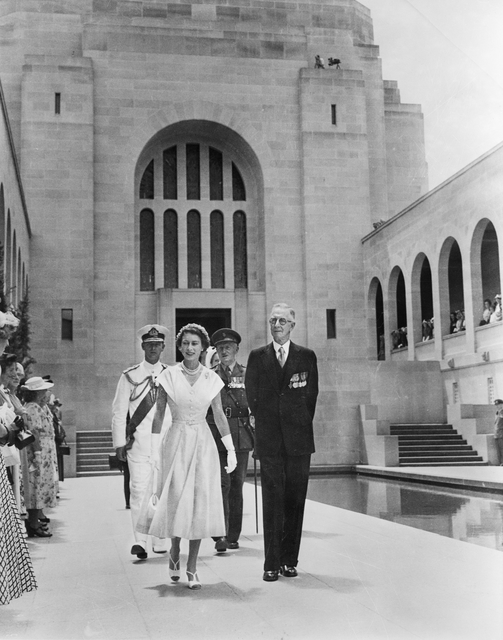
Queen Elizabeth II being guided around AWM by Charles Bean, with The Duke of Edinburgh behind them in naval uniform, February 1954

While the Memorial was initially intended to commemorate only World War I, in 1939 the beginning of World War II led to this role being reviewed. In 1941 the board of the Memorial recommended the Second World War be included and in 1952 the Australian War Memorial Act was amended to extend the AWM's scope of commemoration to include Australian involvement in all wars. Perhaps inadvertently this also narrowed the scope of the Memorial to cover only Australian service personnel, excluding Australians serving in other Commonwealth forces, Merchant Navy sailors and civilians such as members of the Red Cross and war correspondents that has previously been intended to be within the scope of the Memorial. In 1975, its scope was expanded again to allow for the commemoration of Australians who died as a result of war, even those who had not served with an armed forces from Australia.

In 1993, a Tomb of the Unknown Soldier was installed at the AWM. From 1996 to 1999, the AWM expanded and upgraded its museum galleries and exhibitions, as well as create a space for temporary exhibitions.

Christopher Latham was appointed as the AWM's first musical artist-in-residence in 2017. Latham began his Flowers of War series in 2015 to commemorate First World War musicians and artists. His Gallipoli Symphony premiered in 2015 and Diggers' Requiem in 2018. The memorial commissioned Latham's Vietnam Requiem, which was first performed in June 2021, and works are planned to commemorate the Korean War (2023), the Holocaust (2024), and World War II (2025).

In 2020, a biennial literary award for military history was established by the war memorial council, named for Les Carlyon, a former member of the council.

In 2021, the National Capital Authority (NCA) approved the AWM's expansion plans for the site, which involve the demolition of the old Anzac Hall and the construction of a new building that will also incorporate the area previously between the main memorial and ANZAC Hall. These plans have been heavily criticised due to architectural awards ANZAC Hall has received, the building's short lifespan before demolition (as it was opened only in 2001) and significant cost. Also involved in the expansion is an extension to the CEW Bean Building, and refurbishment of the museum's southern entrance and Parade Ground.

In 2022 Kim Beazley, chair of the AWM Council announced that the memorial would be open to covering the Australian Frontier Wars for the first time. Calls for the Memorial to cover the conflict in detail had increased over the decades, beginning with a proposal by historian Geoffrey Blainey in 1979. This proposal was ignored, with critics arguing the Memorial was ignoring the conflict as it was "too confronting or too uncomfortable". Previous directors had argued that the story of the Frontier Wars was the responsibility of the National Museum of Australia and that the Memorial's Act restricted it to cover only deployed Australian forces. The conflict is to be included in a new "Pre-1914 gallery" (which also covers colonial conflicts Australians were involved with such as the Boer War and the Boxer Rebellion), expected to open in 2028.

In September 2023, the memorial changed a label for a display featuring the uniform of Ben Roberts-Smith, a former Special Air Service Regiment soldier, to reference a finding by a judge to a civil standard of "substantial truth" of allegations of war crimes against him. By May 2026, it had been updated three additional times to reflect the rejection of appeals to the case and the laying of criminal charges.

=== Directors ===
The following individuals have served as directors of the Australian War Memorial:

	Name	Tenure	Notes
1	Henry Gullett	1919–1920	
2	J. L. Treloar	1920–1952	
–	Arthur Bazley	1942–1946	Acting director
3	J. J. McGrath	1952–1966	
4	W. R. Lancaster	1966–1974	
–	Bill Sweeting	1974–1975	Acting director
5	Noel Flanagan	1975–1982	
6	James Flemming	1982–1987	
7	Keith Pearson	1987–1990	
8	Brendon Kelson	1990–1994	
9	Steve Gower	1996–2012	Took full-time leave in November 2011
–	Nola Anderson	2011–2012	Acting director
10	Brendan Nelson	2012–2019	
11	Matt Anderson	2020–present	

=== Chair of the Australian War Memorial Council ===
The following individuals have served as chairman of the Australian War Memorial Council:

- Kerry Stokes (12 November 2015–2022)
- Brendan Nelson (22 April 2022–30 November 2022)
- Kim Beazley (2 December 2022–present)

== Grounds ==
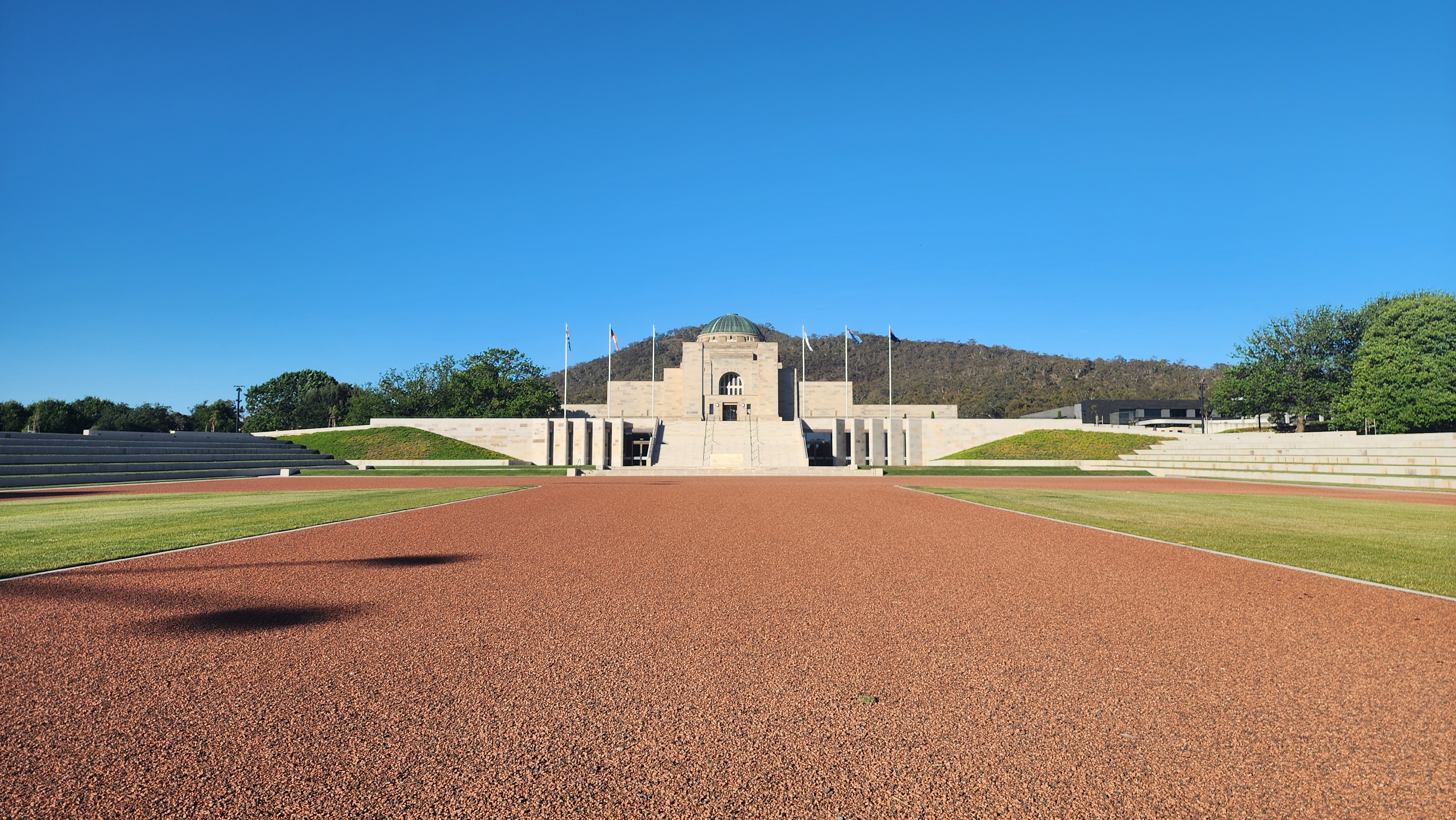
AWM's Parade Ground and Memorial Building from Anzac Parade, Canberra, with Mount Ainslie in the background

The Australian War Memorial is located in Campbell, a suburb of Canberra in the Australian Capital Territory. It is situated on the symbolic terminus of the land axis of Walter Burley Griffin's plan for Canberra, at the base of Mount Ainslie. The property is approximately 14 hectares (35 acres) and is bounded by Limestone Avenue to the southwest, Fairbairn Avenue to the southeast, and Treloar Crescent to the north. It is positioned at the northern terminus of Anzac Parade, which aligns with the land axis of central Canberra's design. This axis runs from the peak of Mount Ainslie in the northeast to Capital Hill, in the southwest, a distance of 5.2 kilometres (3.2 mi). The AWM's positioning along this axis was deliberate to reflect its national importance and provide it with a clear line of sight to Parliament House and vice versa.

The entire AWM is listed on Australia's Commonwealth Heritage List, while the AWM and the adjacent Anzac Parade are also listed on the National Heritage List. Monuments and memorials situated at Anzac Parade are maintained separately by the NCA and do not form part of the Australian War Memorial. To the north of the park is Remembrance Nature Park, the Canberra terminus of Remembrance Driveway, a system of arboreal parks, landmarks and road-side stops between Sydney and Canberra commemorating the 24 World War II and Vietnam War Victoria Cross recipients.

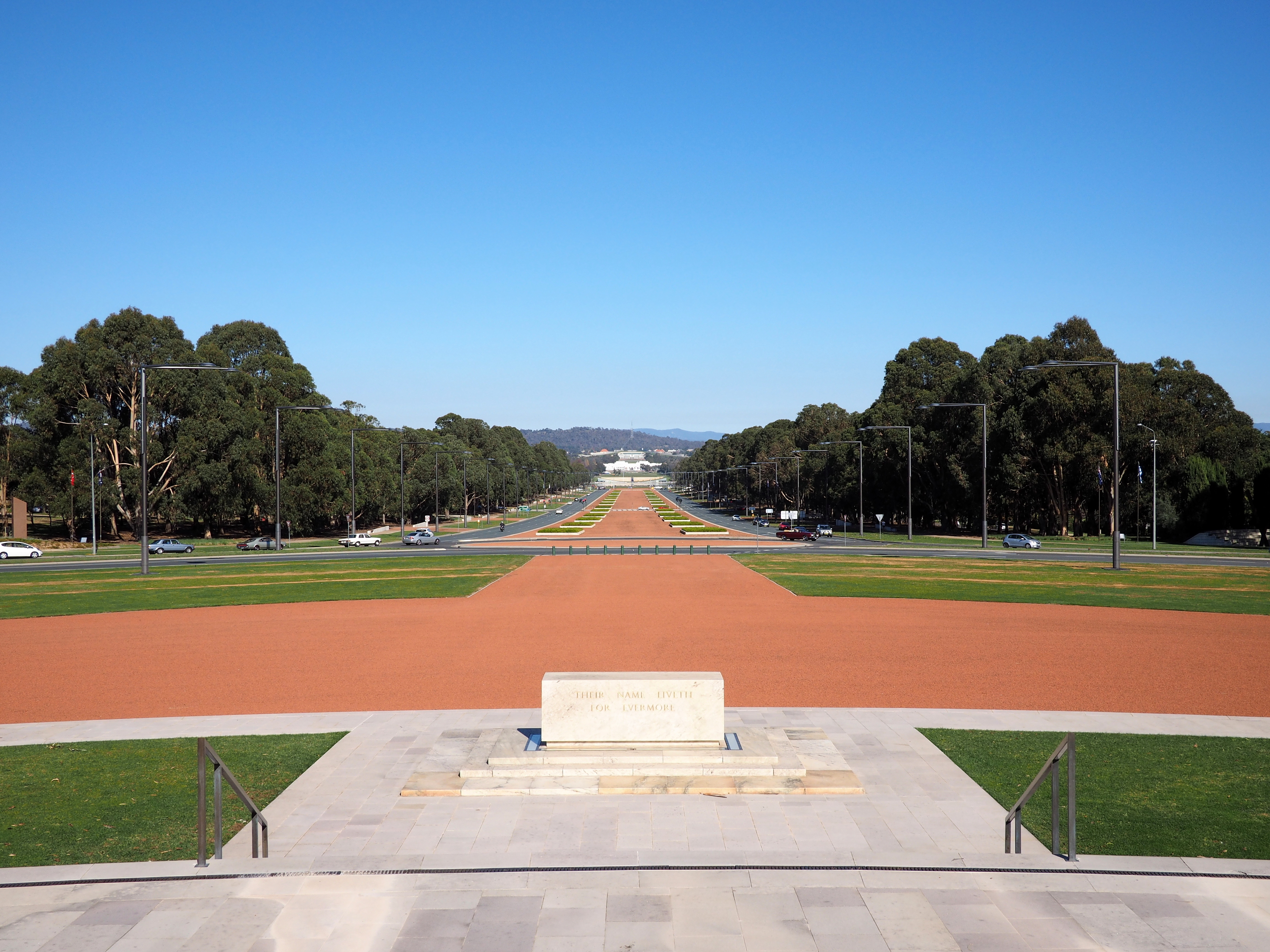
Stone of Remembrance, looking towards the AWM's Parade Ground; Anzac Parade and Parliament House are visible in the background

The southern face of the AWM grounds, the Parade Ground, includes the Stone of Remembrance, a six-and-a-half tonnes remembrance stone that serves as a focal point for major and national ceremonies at the AWM. The stone was relocated to the Parade Ground in 1962. The Parade Ground was redeveloped in 2004 to improve access for ceremonial events, with sandstone terraces and a forecourt surrounding the Stone of Remembrance. In 2021, the Stone of Remembrance was temporarily relocated to the AWM's western courtyard to accommodate construction for the museum's expansion.

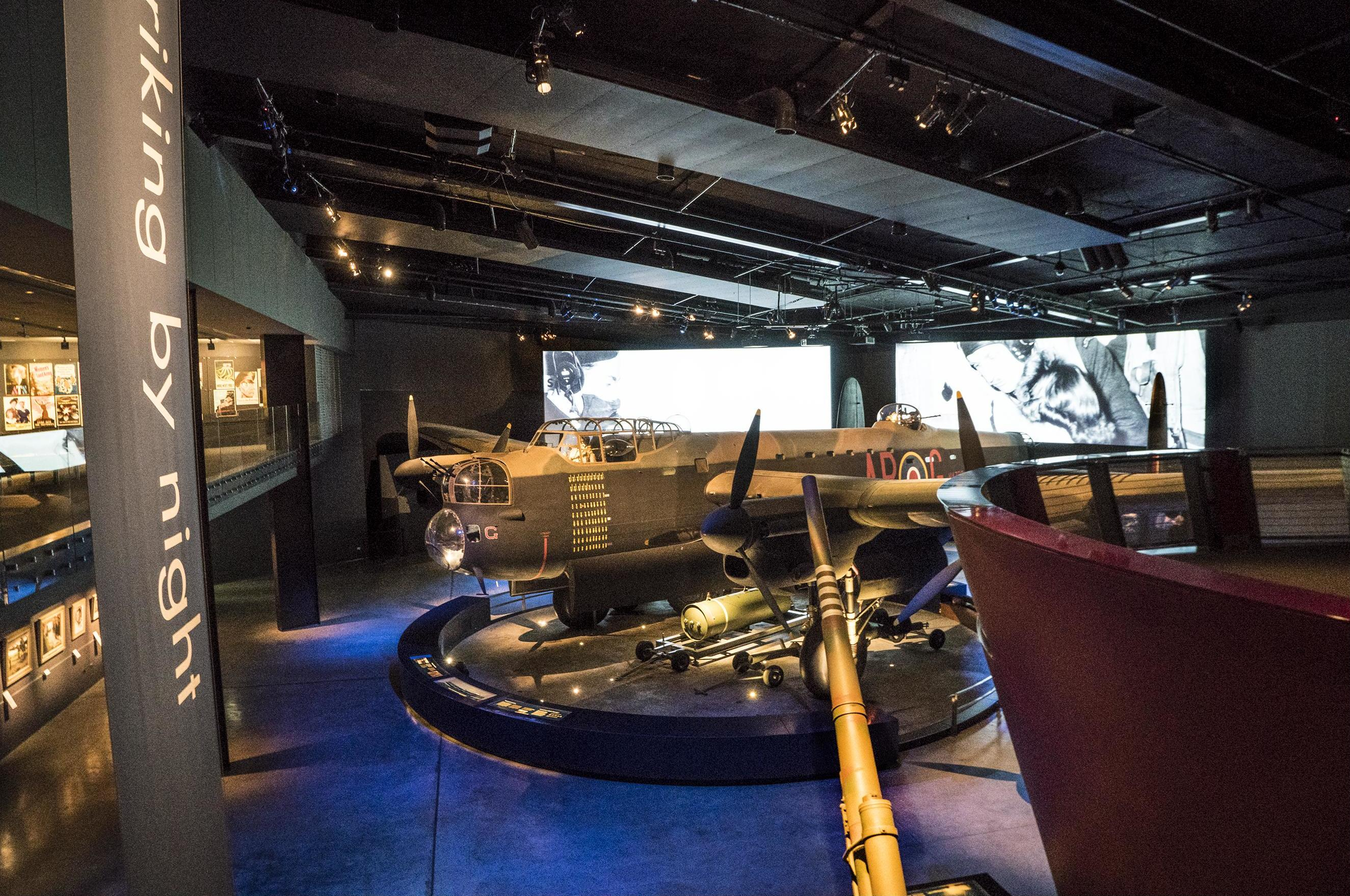
G for George on display inside ANZAC Hall

The property comprises the Memorial Building, ANZAC Hall, the CEW Bean Building, the Administration Building, and a cafe. The Memorial Building houses the AWM's commemorative and exhibition spaces and was opened to the public in 1941. The Administration Building houses the AWM's administrative offices and was completed in 1988. During the 2000s, the AWM opened two new buildings to expand its exhibition and museum operations. ANZAC Hall was opened in 2001 as an 3,098 square metres (33,350 sq ft) exhibition space for large objects, while the CEW Bean Building was opened in 2006 to house some administrative staff and items from the AWM's collection. Poppy's Café was built during the early 2010s, replacing an older café building built in 1960. An underground parking lot is also situated under the cafe.

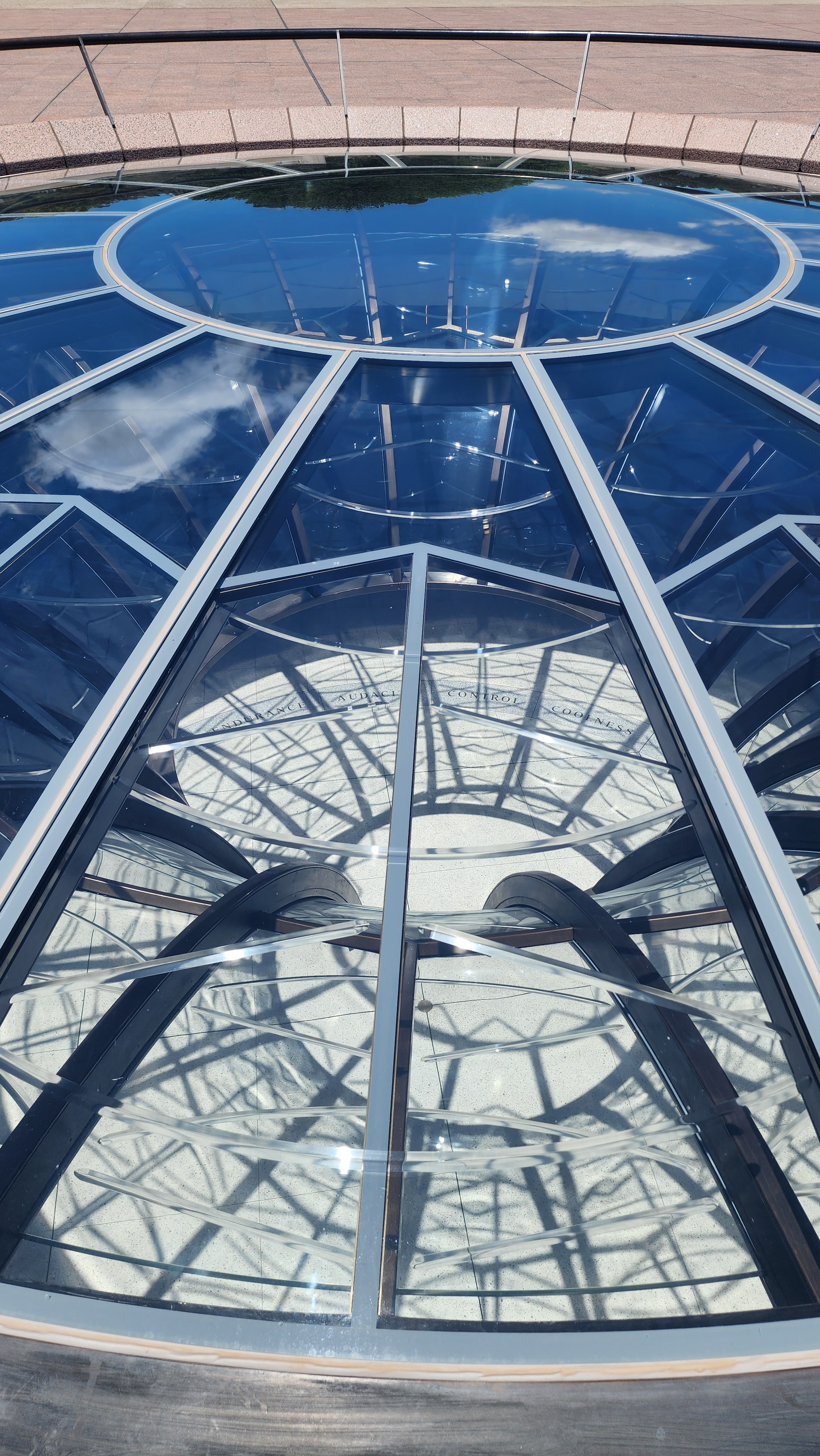
Oculous glass from above; the glass feature forms part of the southern entrance opened in 2025.

The design for the grounds and the Memorial Building were finalised by Emil Sodersten and John Crust during the 1930s. Designs for the AWM's newer buildings, like the Administration Building, ANZAC Hall, and the CEW Bean Building were created by Denton Corker Marshall. The latter two building was built in excavated areas or areas of lower elevation so that it sits below the bulk of the Memorial Building. ANZAC Hall is located north of Memorial Hall and was designed to resemble a battleship, with its battered walls clad with metal panels and curved turret roof design intended to appear like a battleship. However, this building is currently being demolished, to be replaced with new building with a larger exhibition space.

=== Memorial Building ===
The AWM's Memorial Building contains the site's main commemorative areas, as well as most of its museum galleries. The AWM's commemorative area includes the courtyard and the Hall of Memory. In addition to these spaces, the Memorial Building also contains the AWM's research centre and the museum shop. Although the Memorial Building was one of the earliest buildings designed for the AWM, its design was not finalised until 1936. The building was officially opened on 11 November 1941, it was not completed until several decades later. Two extension wings, which utilised the same building design and materials, were built into the Memorial Building from 1968 to 1971.

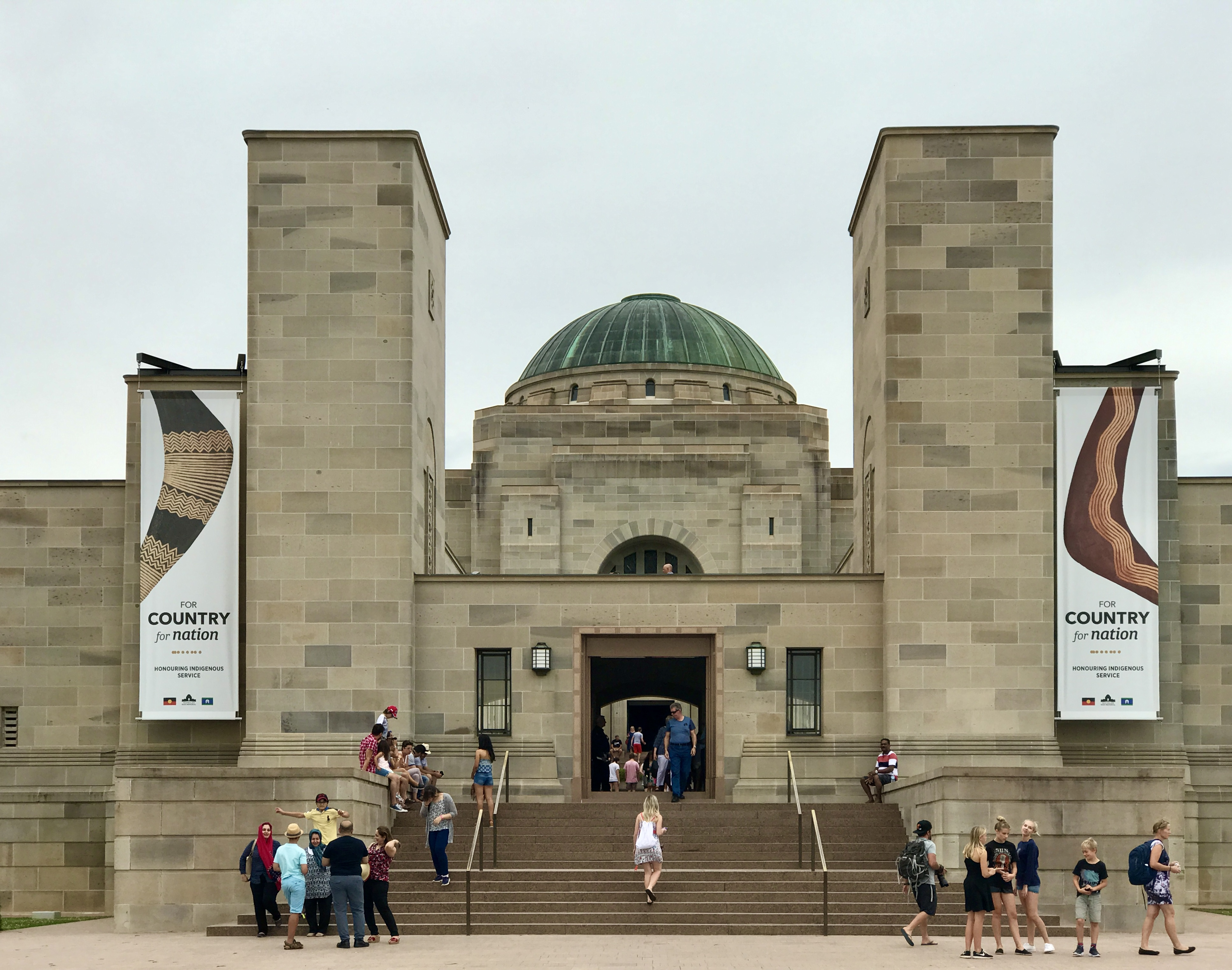
Entrance to the Memorial Building, flanked by two pylons at its front

The building was designed in an Art Deco style, with Byzantine and Egyptian motifs in its interpenetrating masses and pylons at its front. The design is reflective of architectural designs that were popular during the period, with the Art Deco style being a popular design in Canberra during the interwar period. Egyptian architectural motifs common in late-19th century monuments, memorials, and mausoleums, had also merged with the Art Deco style of the period, regarded as a Moderne style. Although the Art Deco styling of the Memorial Building can primarily be attributed to Sodersten, Crust also had a strong influence on the design of the property, such as the addition of the Hall of Memory.

In 1937, the AWM's board commissioned Napier Waller to create large-scale murals and mosaics for the building, and Leslie Bowles to produce designs for a large-shaped sculpture. The AWM rejected several design proposals by Bowles' before his death, with Ray Ewers commissioned to continue working on Bowles' designs. Ewers's final design, Australian Serviceman was accepted in 1955, the same year Waller's mosaics were installed in the Memorial Building's Hall of Memory. Waller's murals are the largest installed in Australia.

==== Courtyard ====
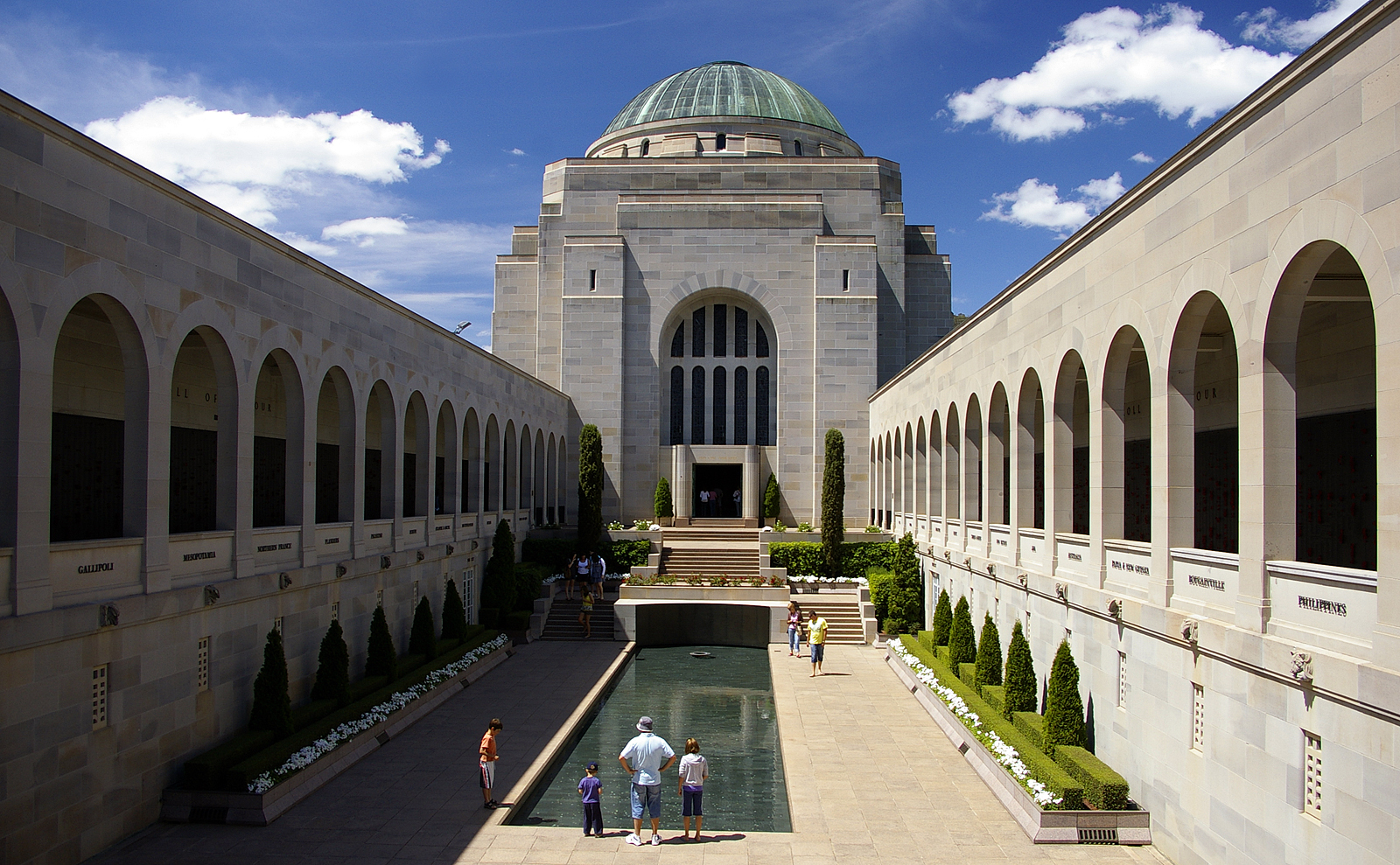
Courtyard of Memorial Building looking towards the Hall of Memory

The entrance to the courtyard is located immediately after the Memorial Building's entrance and is flanked by lion statues from the original Menin Gate, donated to the Australian War Memorial by the Mayor of Ypres in 1936. The courtyard contains a reflecting pool and steps up its northern end leading to the Hall of Memory. The courtyard is lined by arched cloisters, with the Roll of Honour positioned behind them. The Roll of Honour panels were installed in 1961 to commemorate the dead of World War I. Subsequent panels to commemorate the dead from other conflicts were installed after the 1960s. The Roll of Honour is situated on the east, west and southern walls of the courtyard and contains the names of over 102,000 Australians killed in war, from the Mahdist War and the War in Afghanistan. No rank or distinction is recorded with the names, on the basis that all died equally.

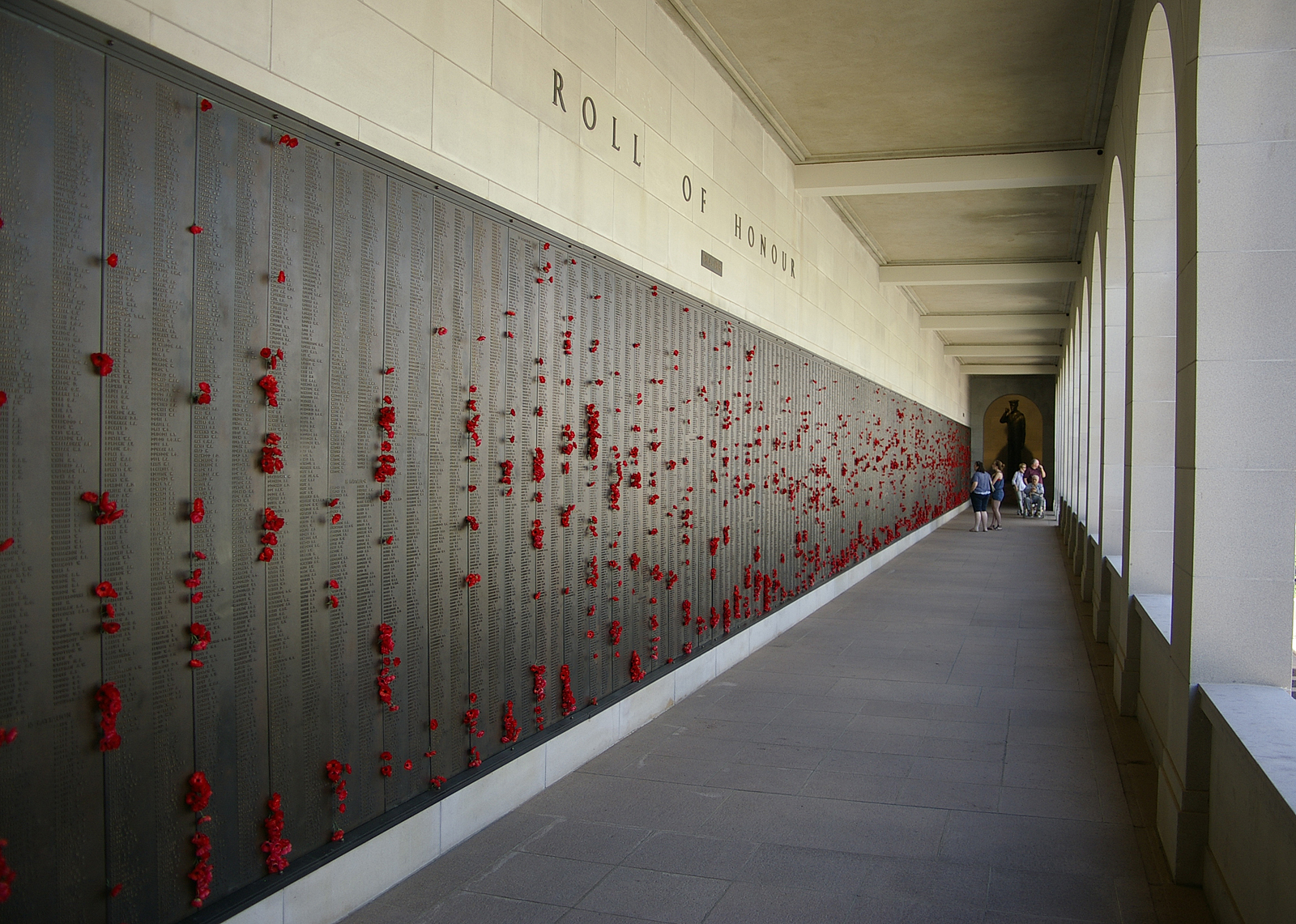
Roll of Honour panels along the walls of the courtyard

The courtyard has 26 carved stone figures, representing Australian fauna and Indigenous people. The original plaster models were designed by Bowles and sculpted by W. Swan in 1940. However, as the carvings were made of Wondabyne sandstone, they suffered extensive deterioration until they were replaced in the 2010s. Originally all were gargoyles, but the two figures depicting an Indigenous man and woman had their functionality as gargoyles removed following consultations with Indigenous elders in 2017.

Plants were introduced into the courtyard in 1977, to address a perceived need to soften the "austere" appearance of the area. A granite cascade by Robert Woodward was added to the northern end of the pool in 1980, which was later replaced by an eternal flame in 1988.

==== Hall of Memory ====
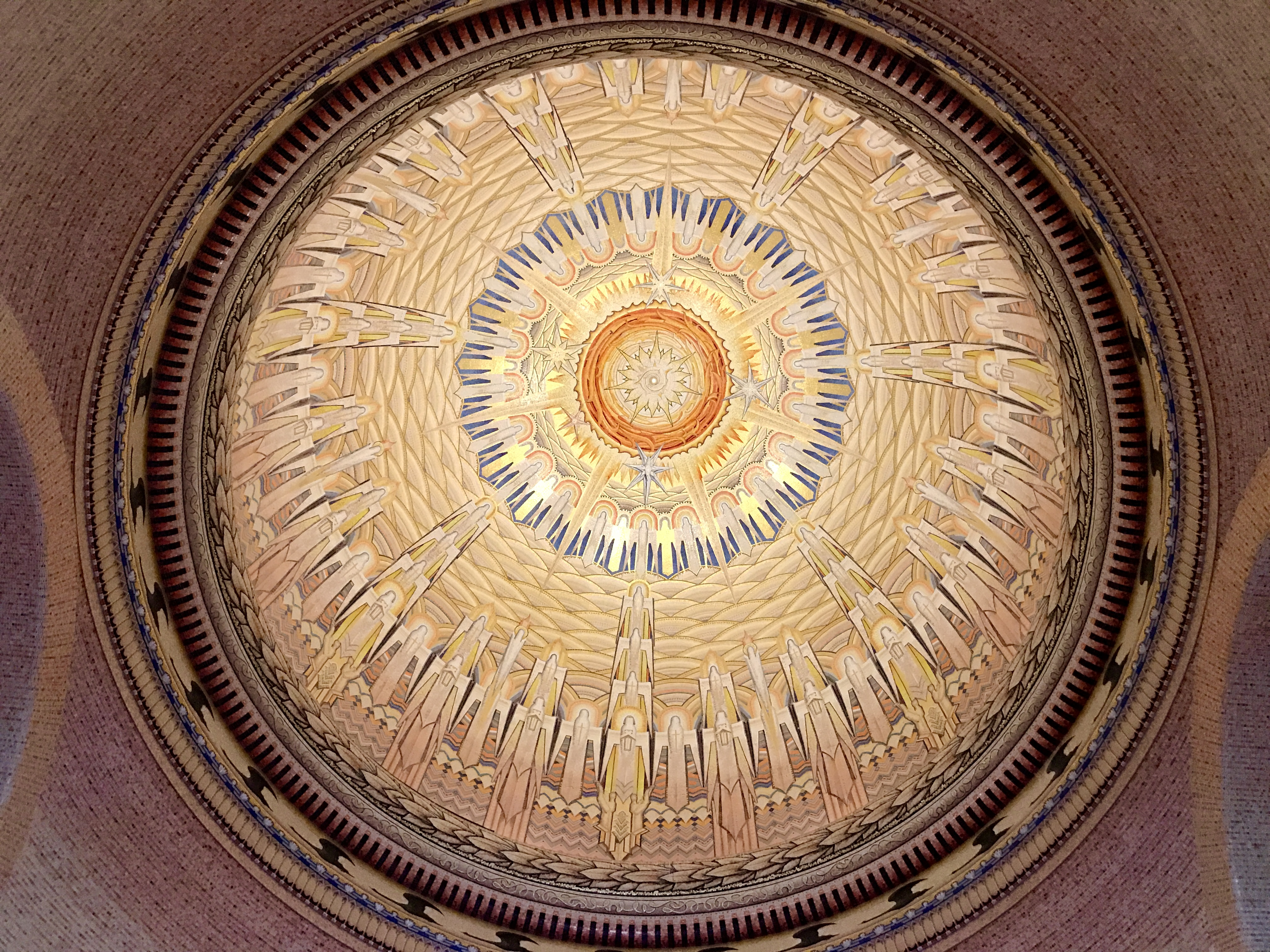
Interior of the Hall of Memory dome

The Memorial Building's Hall of Memory is located north of the courtyard, in the domed portion of the structure. The dome itself is representative of the ascent of the dead. The Hall of Memory contains the Tomb of the Unknown Australian Soldier. The Hall also contained Ewer's completed statue until its relocation to the sculpture garden in the late 1990s. Four 11 metres (36 ft) pillars designed by Janet Laurence are placed behind the Tomb in front of a stained glass window, where Ewer's statue once stood. The pillars represent the elements of air, earth, fire, and water. The stained glass windows and mosaics were designed by Waller, representing Australia's armed services. Over six million glass tiles were imported from Italy to complete the mosaic compositions of an airman, sailor, servicewoman, and soldier.

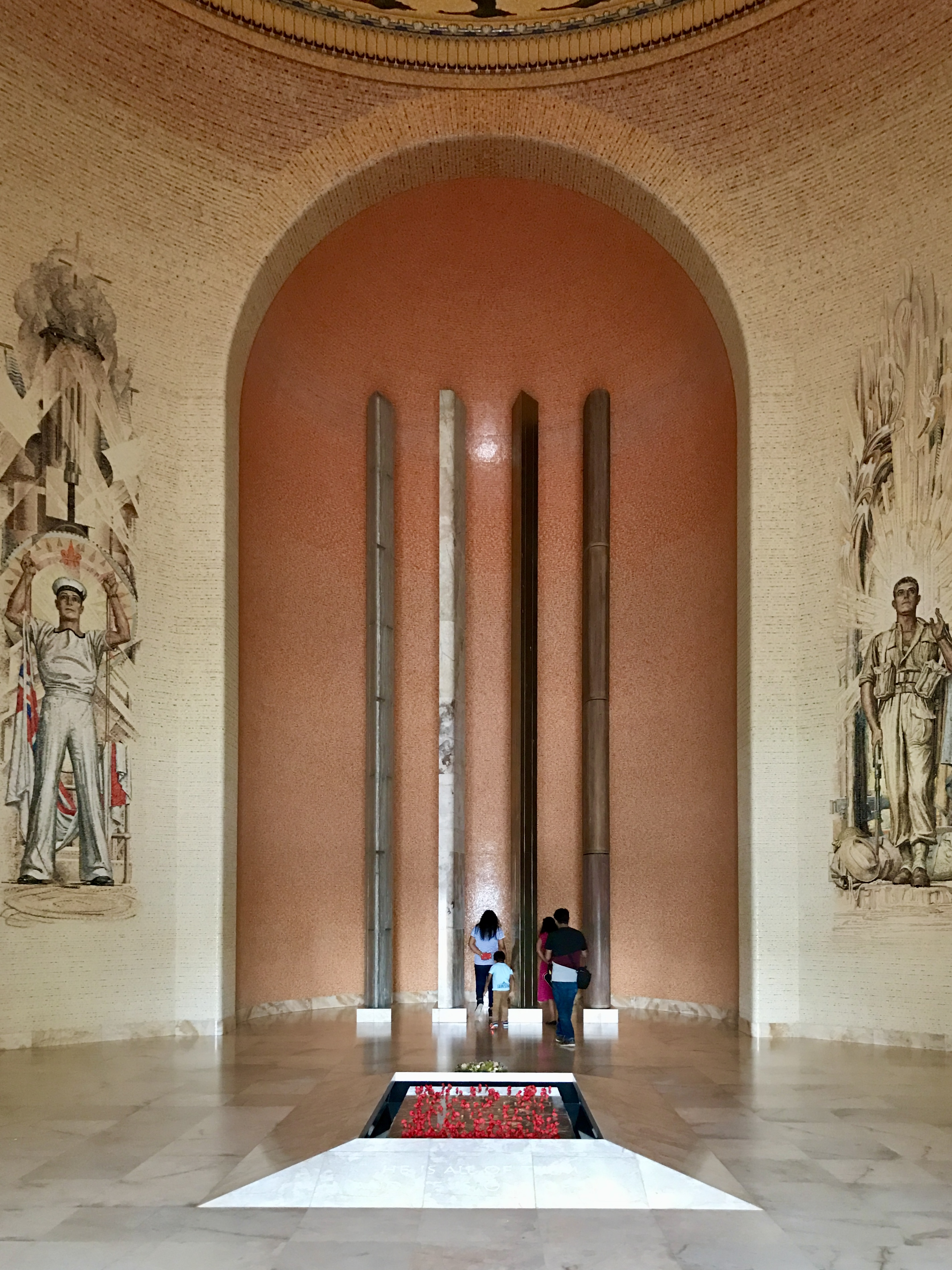
Tomb of the Unknown Australian Soldier in the foreground, with two of the four mosaics by Napier Waller and the four pillars by Janet Laurence in the Hall of Memory

The function of the Hall of Memory has shifted significantly from the original conception of the building. Previously it was intended to contain the Roll of Honour, but for cost reasons this was located in the courtyard in the final design. This left the purpose of the Hall uncertain, with Commonwealth Director of Works JS Murdoch recommending in the late 1920s a statute "symbolising the effect of war on civilisation". Treloar suggested a stone of remembrance and a cross of sacrifice similar to those of the Imperial War graves where visitors could lay wreaths. However, the Depression ended further expansion. While some members of the RSL recommended a local tomb of the unknown soldier following the internment of the Unknown Warrior in Westminster Abbey, this was rejected by those who considered the Unknown Warrior as representing all the war dead in the broader British Empire. One member of the RSL stated "we claim kindred with his sacred clay. He is our hero as much as he is the hero of any other part of the empire. His tomb is a symbol of British unity." This position was formally taken by the RSL in 1922, stating "the sentiment of the Empire was expressed in the burial in London".

On the opening of the Memorial in 1941, the Hall was planned to contain a "female figure, raised beyond a sarcophagus, symbolising Australia proudly and courageously giving her all in the cause of freedom and honour". This did not eventuate, and instead a monumental column designed by Leslie Bowles, was mocked up in plaster. It depicted four figures representing the Four Freedoms invoked by Franklin D. Roosevelt. However, the relevant minister severely attacked the proposal as a "monstrosity" and the plans for the artwork were destroyed. Subsequently, a work of monumental realism Australian Serviceman was installed, no longer a monument to mourning, but instead symbolising "'Young Australia' in an attitude of Remembrance, Hope for the Future, Achievement".

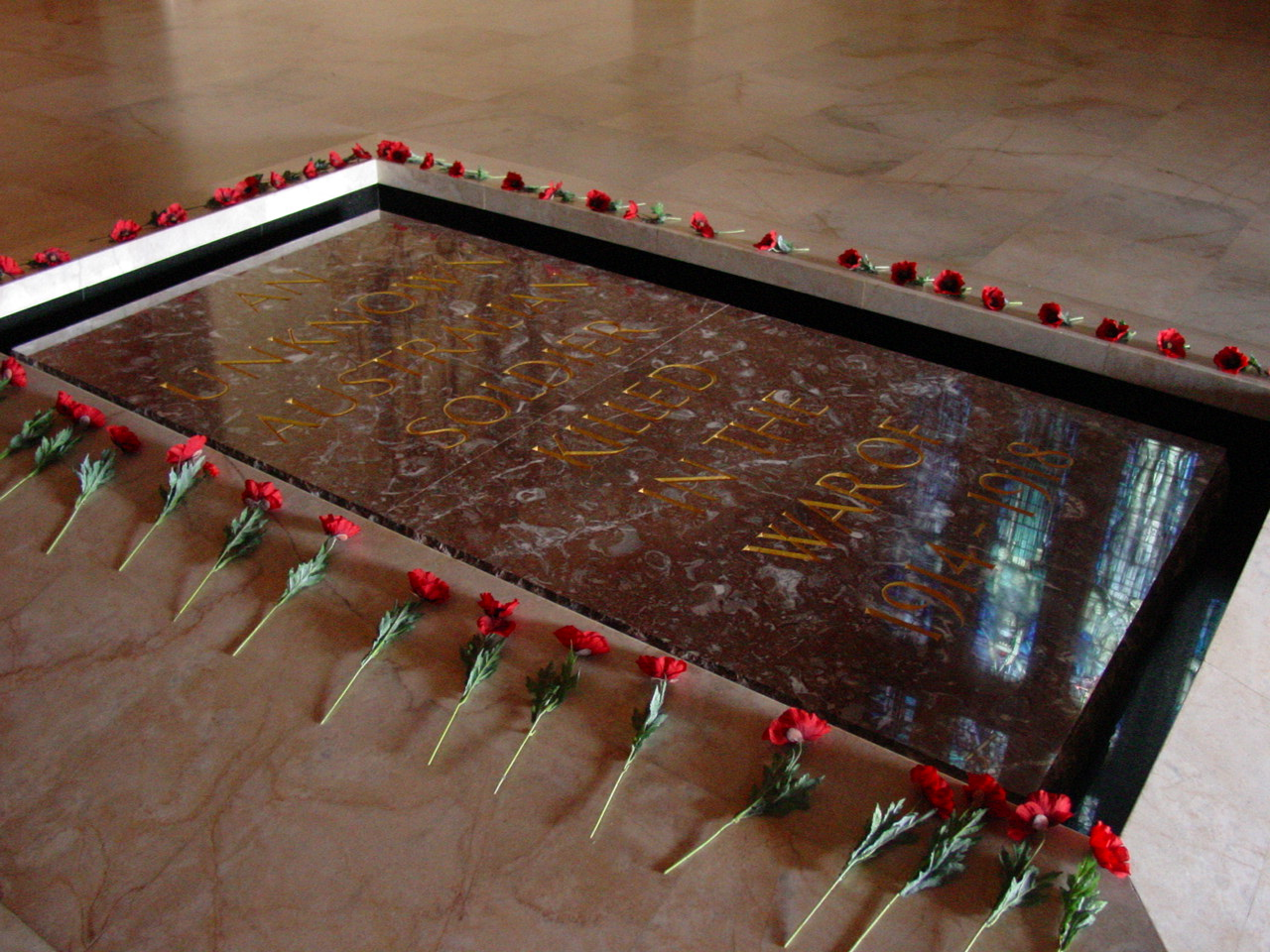
Tomb of the Unknown Australian Soldier

The end of the British Empire and the rise in Australian nationalism lessened the connections Australians had with the Unknown Warrior in London. The RSL reversed its position in 1970, but the board of the Memorial was opposed stating that a tomb "too late, and verging on the macabre". As such, the RSL reversed its position in 1971. However, calls for an internment continued and in 1991 Ashley Ekins proposed a tomb be included. Australian Serviceman was moved to a new sculpture garden in 1993. On Remembrance Day that year, prime minister Paul Keating participated in the ceremony of the internment with a lauded speech in which he declared "He is all of them. And he is one of us." Later similar tombs were created in the other former British dominions of Canada (2000) and New Zealand (2004). Historians James Curran and Stuart Ward suggests that part of the impetus for a Tomb of the Unknown Soldier after so many years was the incongruousness of Australian Serviceman, "arguable the last monument to muscular imperial manhood ever erected in Australia" to Australians who now longer identified with the imperial ideal and instead looked for symbols more in keeping with Australia's new independent status.

In 1999 the head of the tomb was inscribed with the words "Known unto God", similar to those on other Commonwealth graves. A controversy erupted in 2013 when it was stated that this inscription was to be replaced with another quote from the Keating speech: "We do not know this Australian's name, we never will". However, due to criticism this plan was dropped, with instead the previously mentioned Keating quote replaced a previous inscription that stated "He symbolises all those Australians who've died in war".

==== Museum areas ====
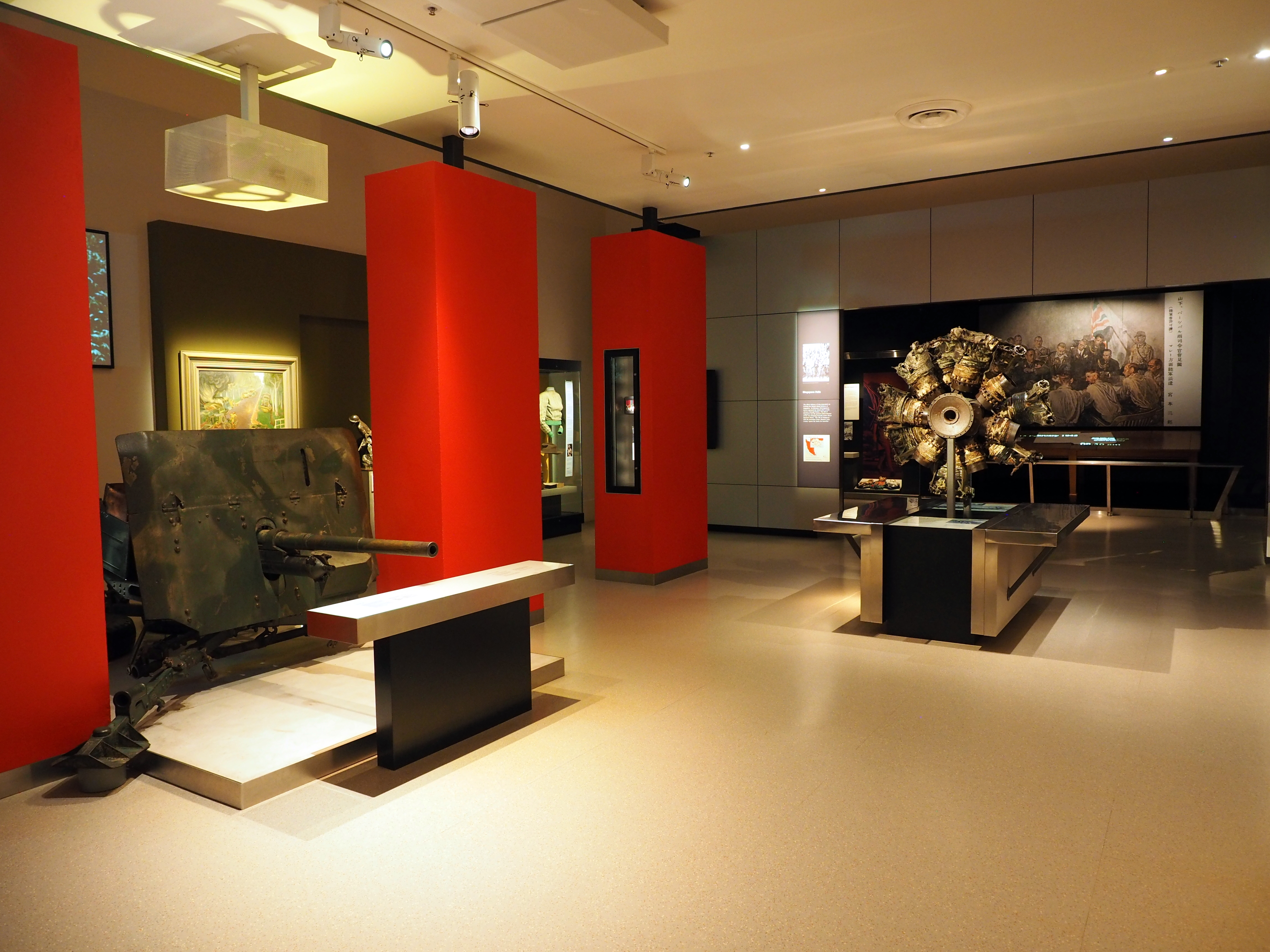
Exhibits in the Second World War Gallery relating to the Malayan campaign and the fall of Singapore

The Memorial Building's museum and exhibits are located on its lower levels and surround the building's commemorative sections. Several galleries in the Memorial Building are organised by conflict, like the First World War gallery and the Second World War gallery. The AWM also operates galleries that are not specific to a single conflict, like the Colonial Conflict gallery, Conflicts 1945 to Today gallery, the Aircraft Hall, and the Hall of Valour. Although many of these galleries incorporate dioramas, most of them are located in the First and Second World War galleries. Most of these dioramas are made of hessian, plaster, timber, and lead, and were designed to be transportable.

The First and Second World War galleries are made up of four interconnected galleries and are located in the oldest portions of the building. These interconnected galleries formerly had a skylight running its full length, although this was later covered up to protect items on display from exposure. The Second World War gallery was redeveloped in the late 1990s, while the First World War gallery was redeveloped in 2014. The Sinai and Palestine area in the First World War gallery is the only exhibition in the AWM that retained many of its original architectural and exhibition features.

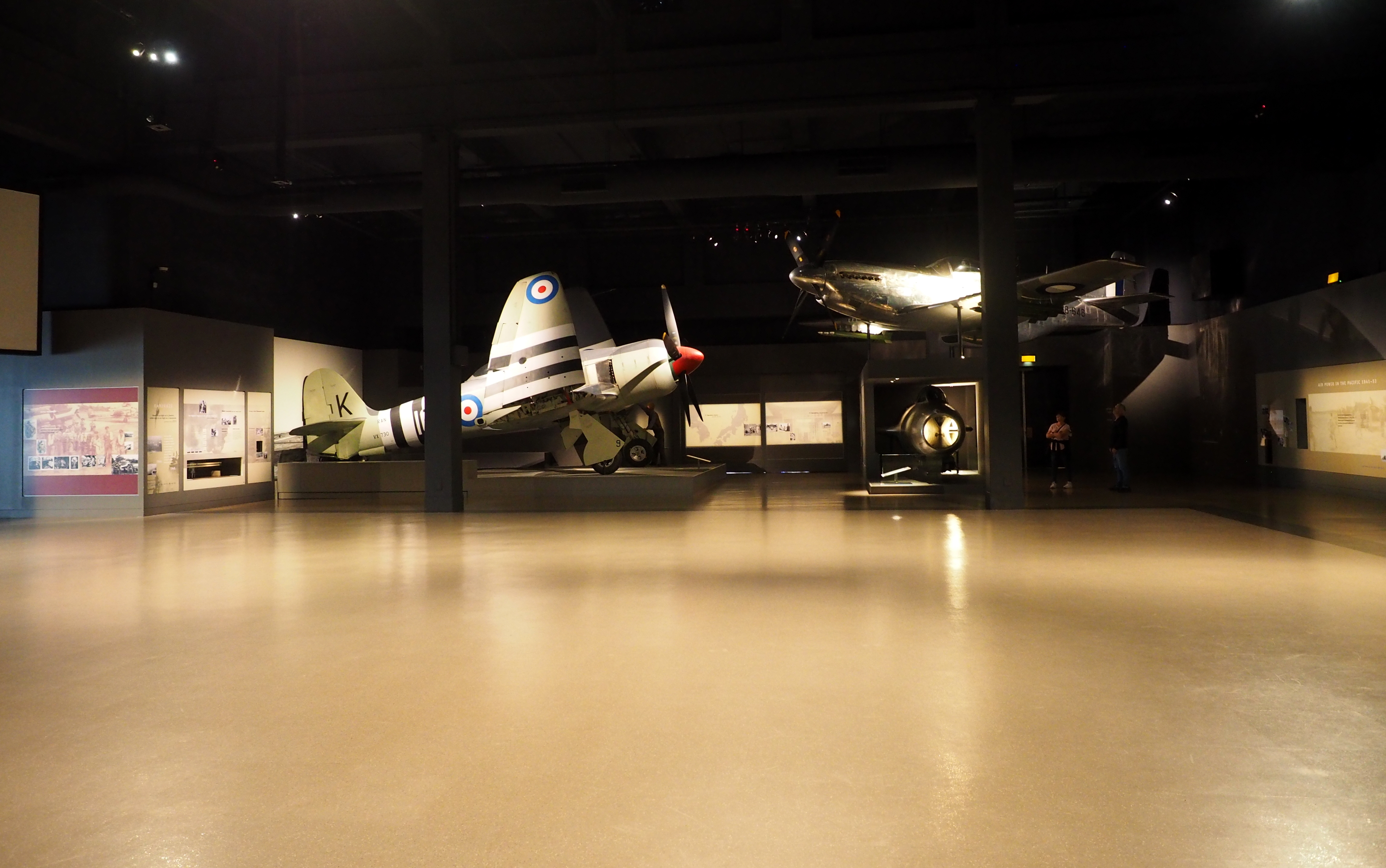
Aircraft on display at the Memorial Building's Aircraft Hall

The Aircraft Hall, the Special Exhibition Gallery, the Orientation Gallery, and the Conflicts 1945 to Today Gallery are the newest galleries installed in the AWM. The former three galleries were installed in the late 1990s, and the latter gallery was installed in 2007–08.

The Hall of Valour is another gallery that is located below the Hall of Memory and honours Australia's Victoria Cross and George Cross recipients. The AWM's collection contains a display of 76 of the 101 Victoria Crosses awarded to Australian soldiers and is the largest publicly held collection of the medal in the world. (Note: The Australian War Memorial houses the largest publicly-owned collection of Victoria Crosses. The largest overall collection of the medal is located in the Lord Ashcroft Gallery at the Imperial War Museum London. However, that collection is privately owned by The Lord Ashcroft.) This includes all nine Victoria Crosses awarded to Australians at Gallipoli: Alexander Burton, William Dunstan, John Hamilton, Albert Jacka, Leonard Keysor, Alfred Shout, William Symons, Hugo Throssell and Frederick Tubb. The medal issued to Shout was provided to the AWM by Kerry Stokes, who purchased the medal for a world-record price of A$1,000,000 and asked that it be displayed in the Hall of Valour. The remains of a mosaic from a Byzantine church uncovered by Australian soldiers during the Second Battle of Gaza are also installed in the Hall of Valour.

=== Sculpture garden ===
The western portion of the AWM grounds was remodelled in 1999 for use as a sculpture garden. The first sculpture placed in the garden was Ewers' Australian Serviceman statue, relocated from the Memorial Building's Hall of Memory. As of 2022, a total of 25 memorials or sculptures have been installed within the grounds of the AWM, and over 150 plaques which commemorate individual unit associations can be found in the gardens.

In addition to the sculpture garden, several sculptures are also located on the eastern portion of the AWM grounds.

Memorials and sculptures

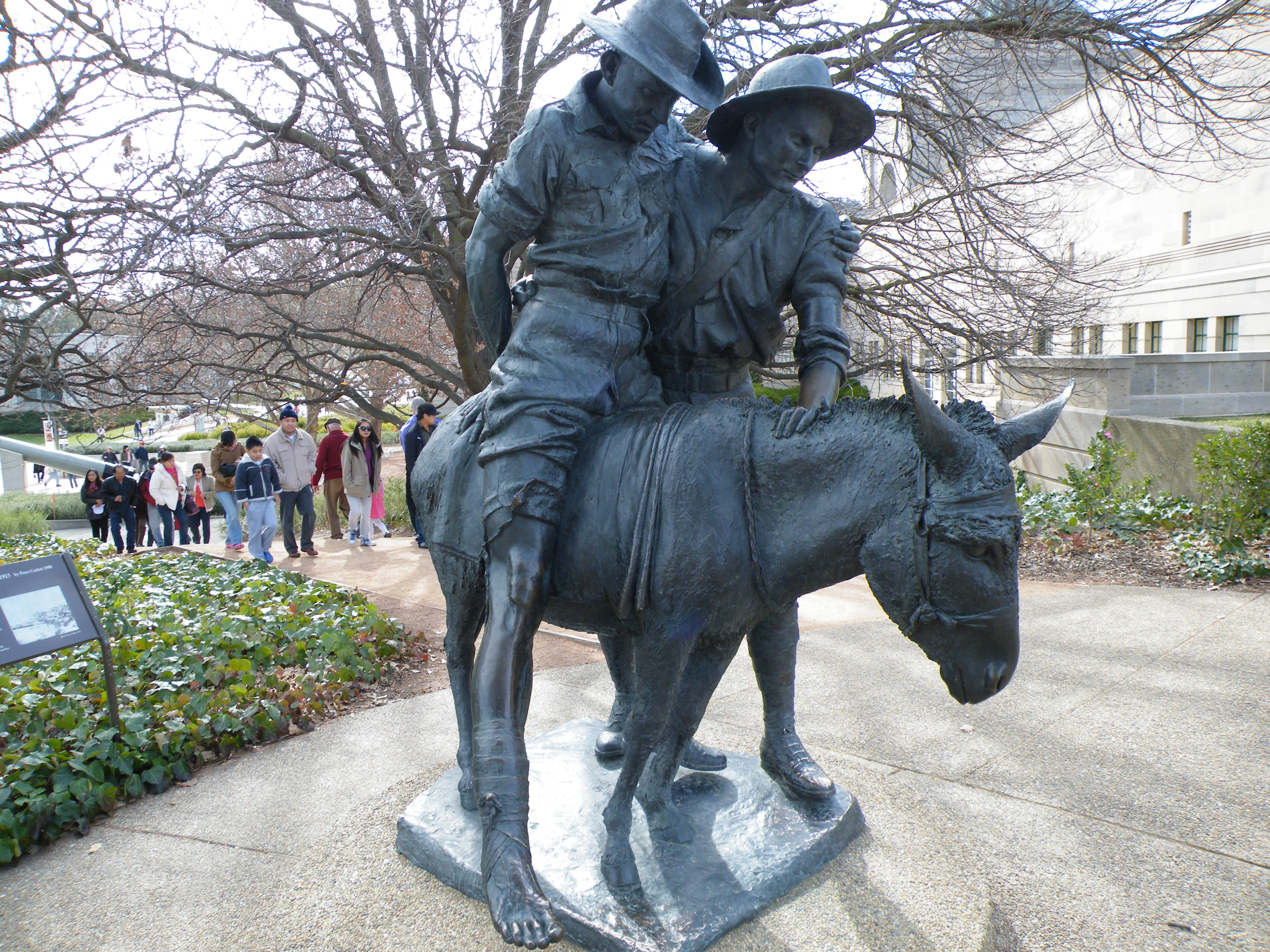
Simpson and his Donkey

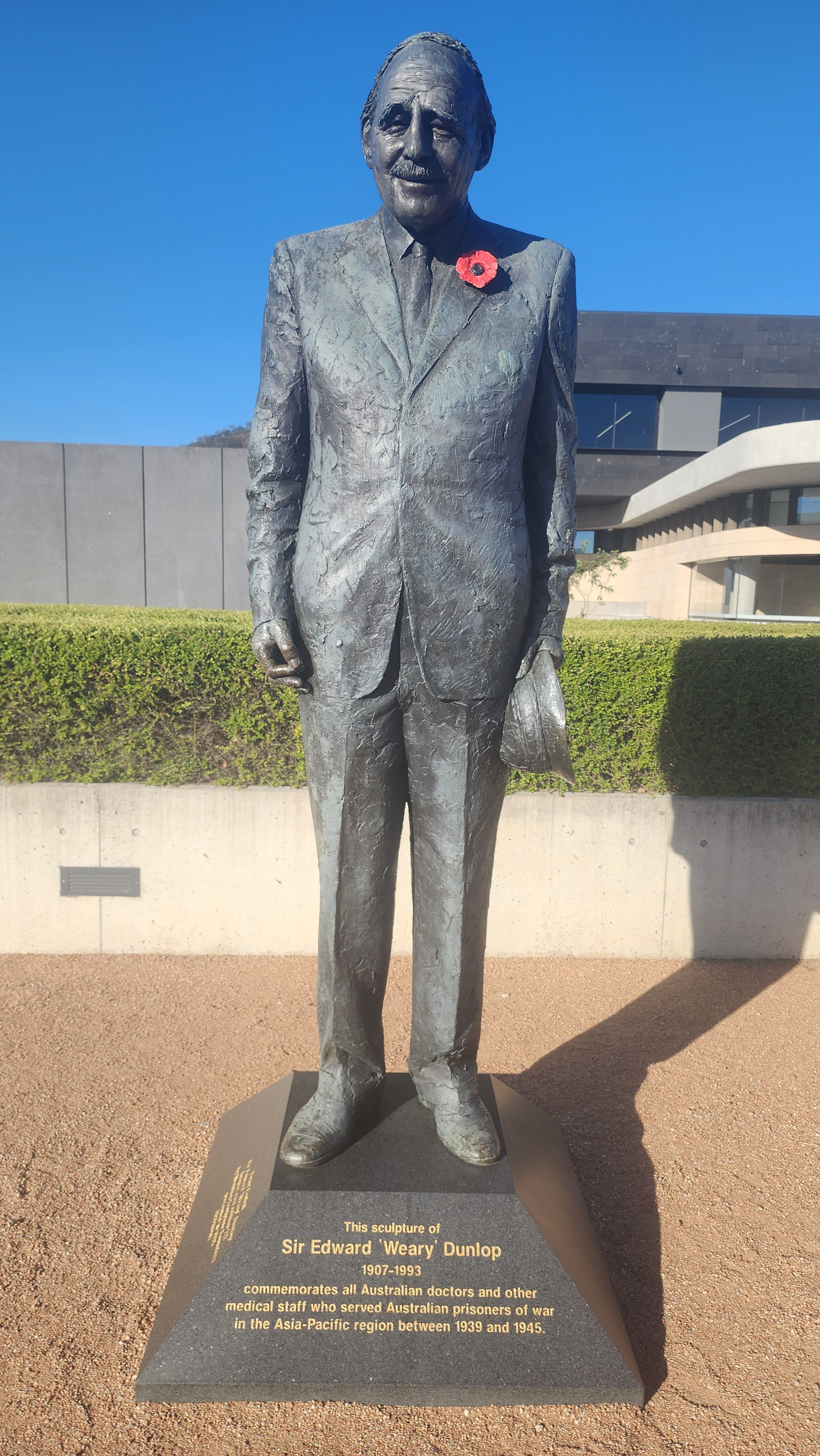
Edward 'Weary' Dunlop Statue

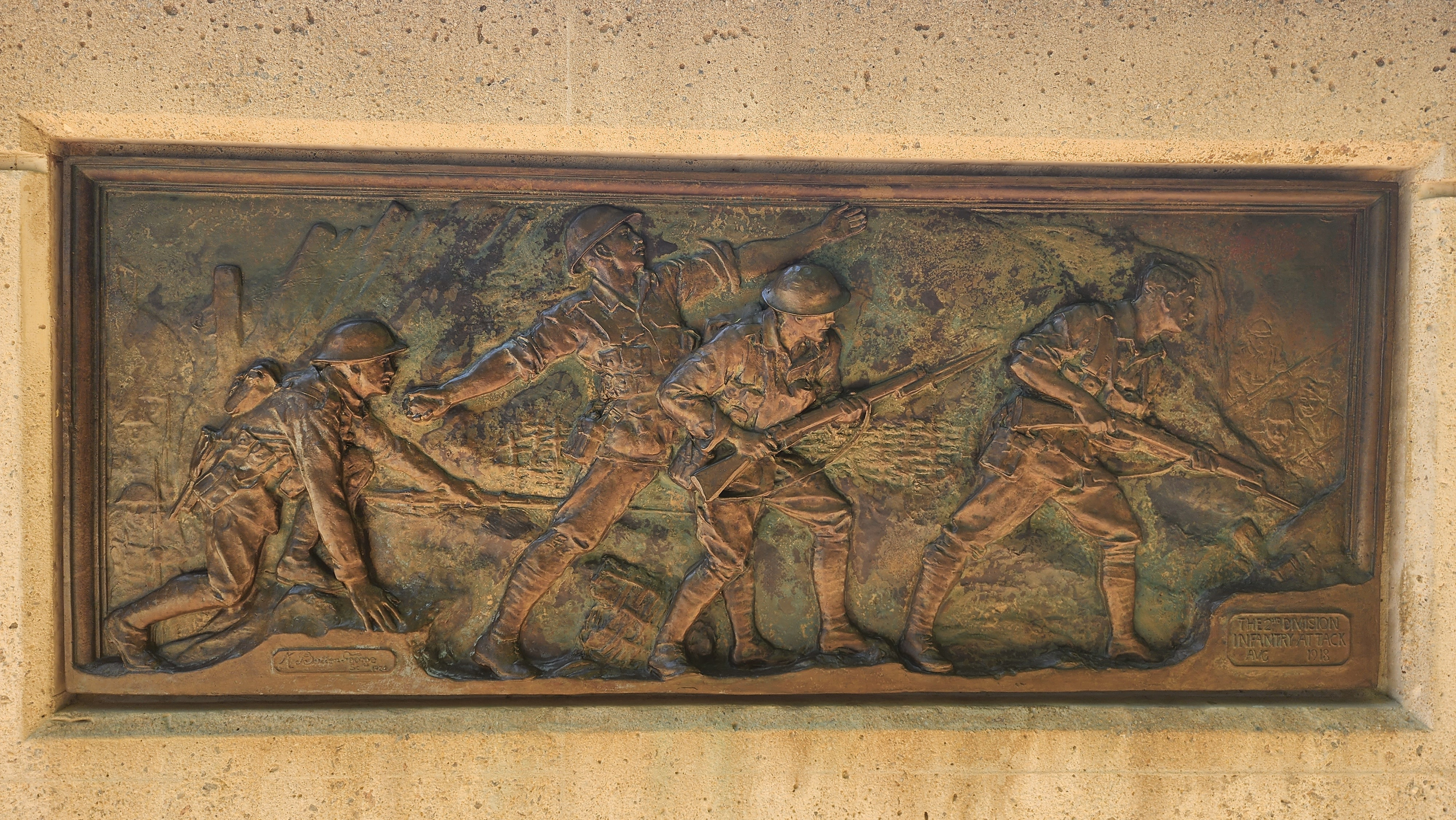
2nd Division infantry attack by May Butler-George, Meridian Sculpture Founders

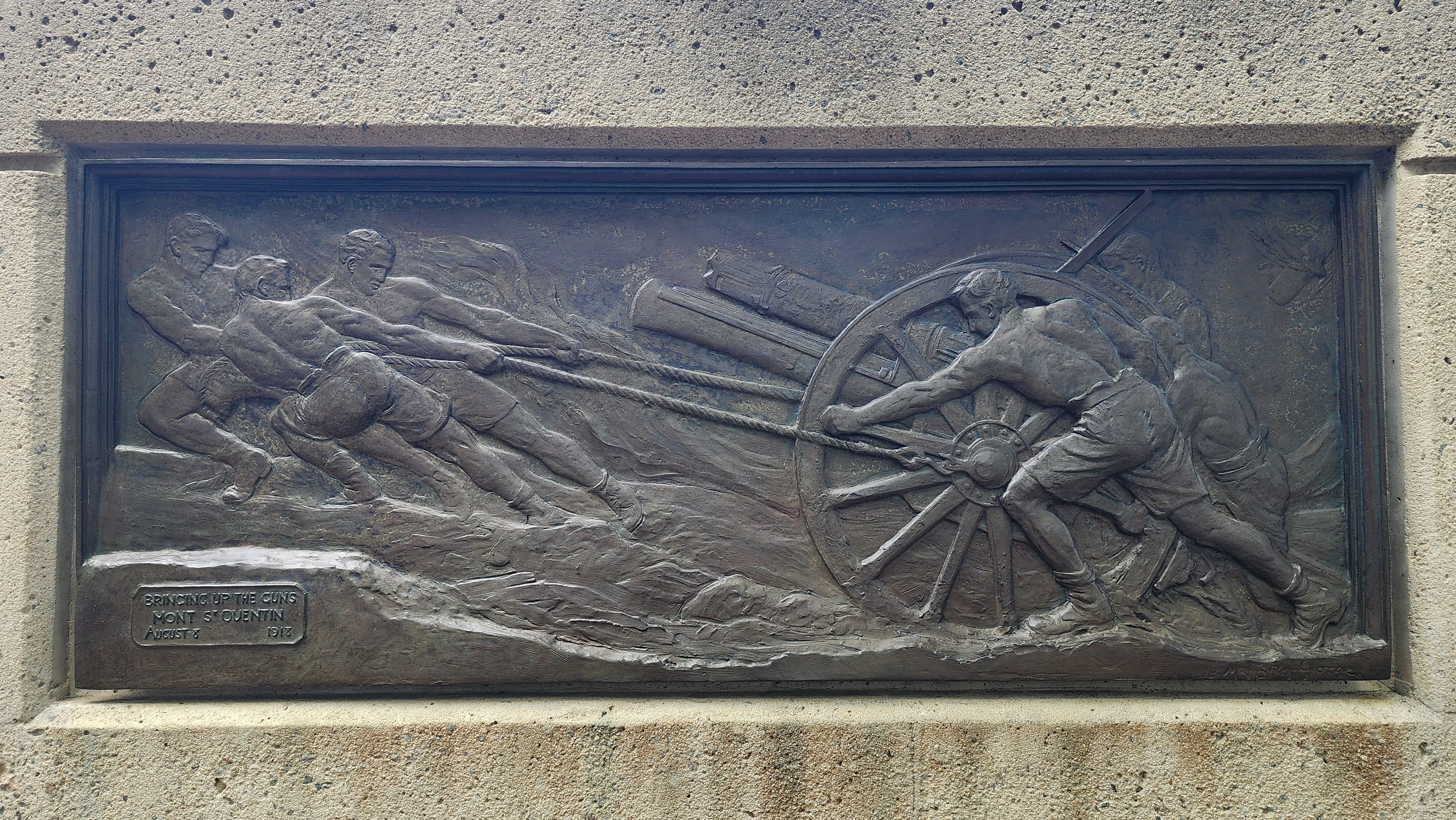
Bringing up the guns by May Butler-George, Meridian Sculpture Founders

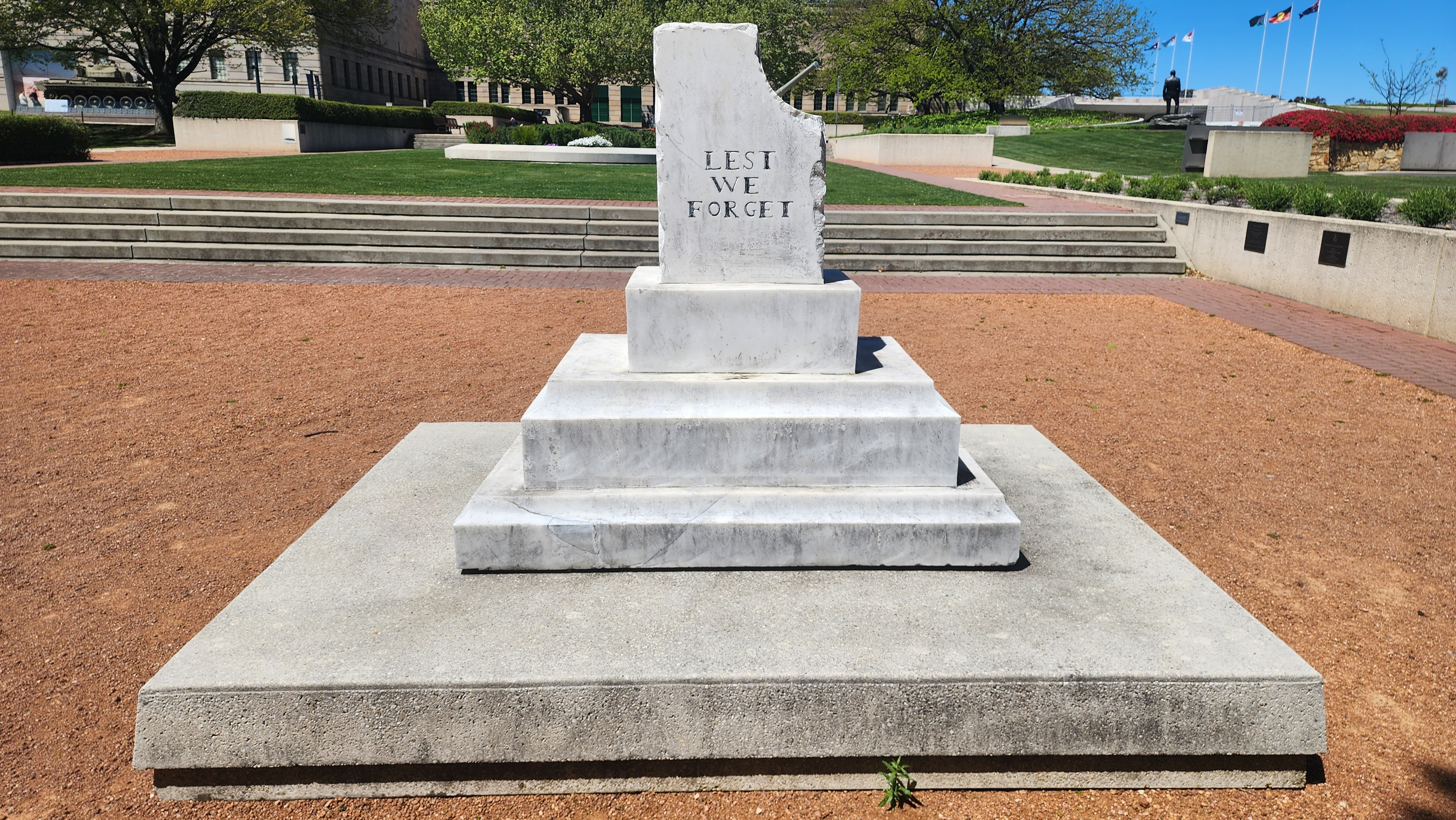
Afghanistan Camp Russell Memorial

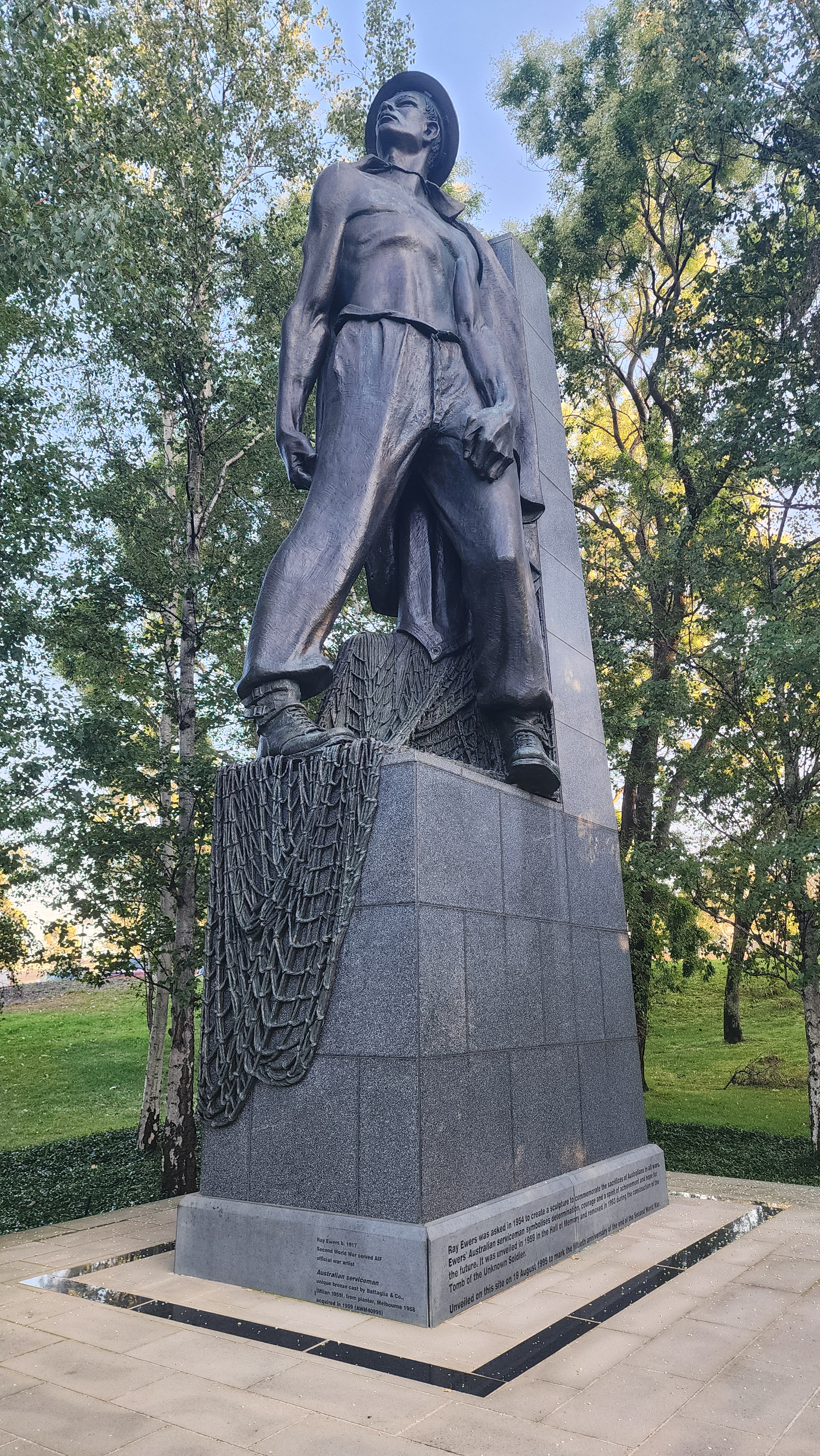
Australian Serviceman by Ray Ewers, Battaglia & Co

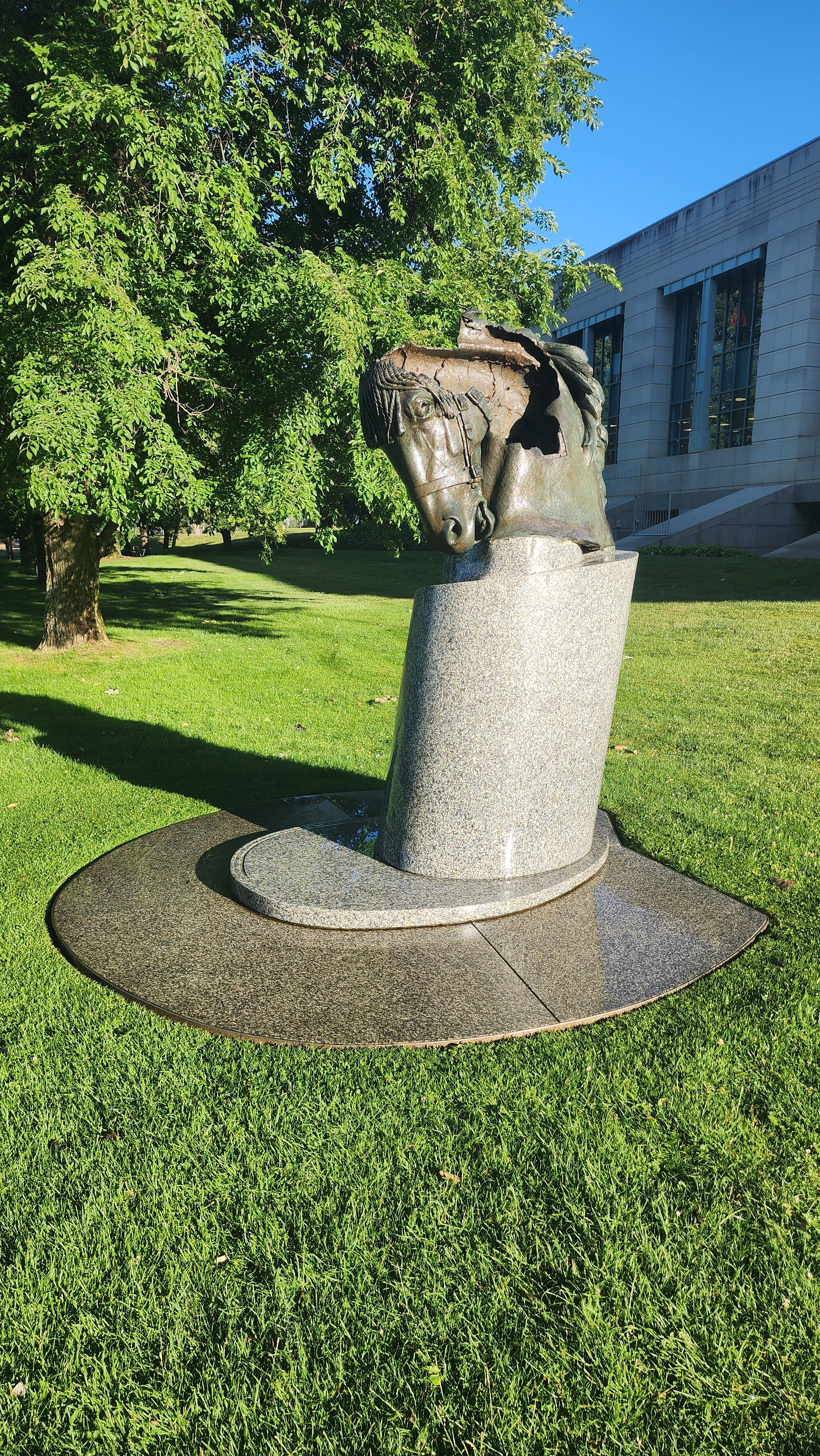
Animals in War Memorial by Charles Web Gilbert, Steven Holland, Bertram Mackennal, Paul Montford

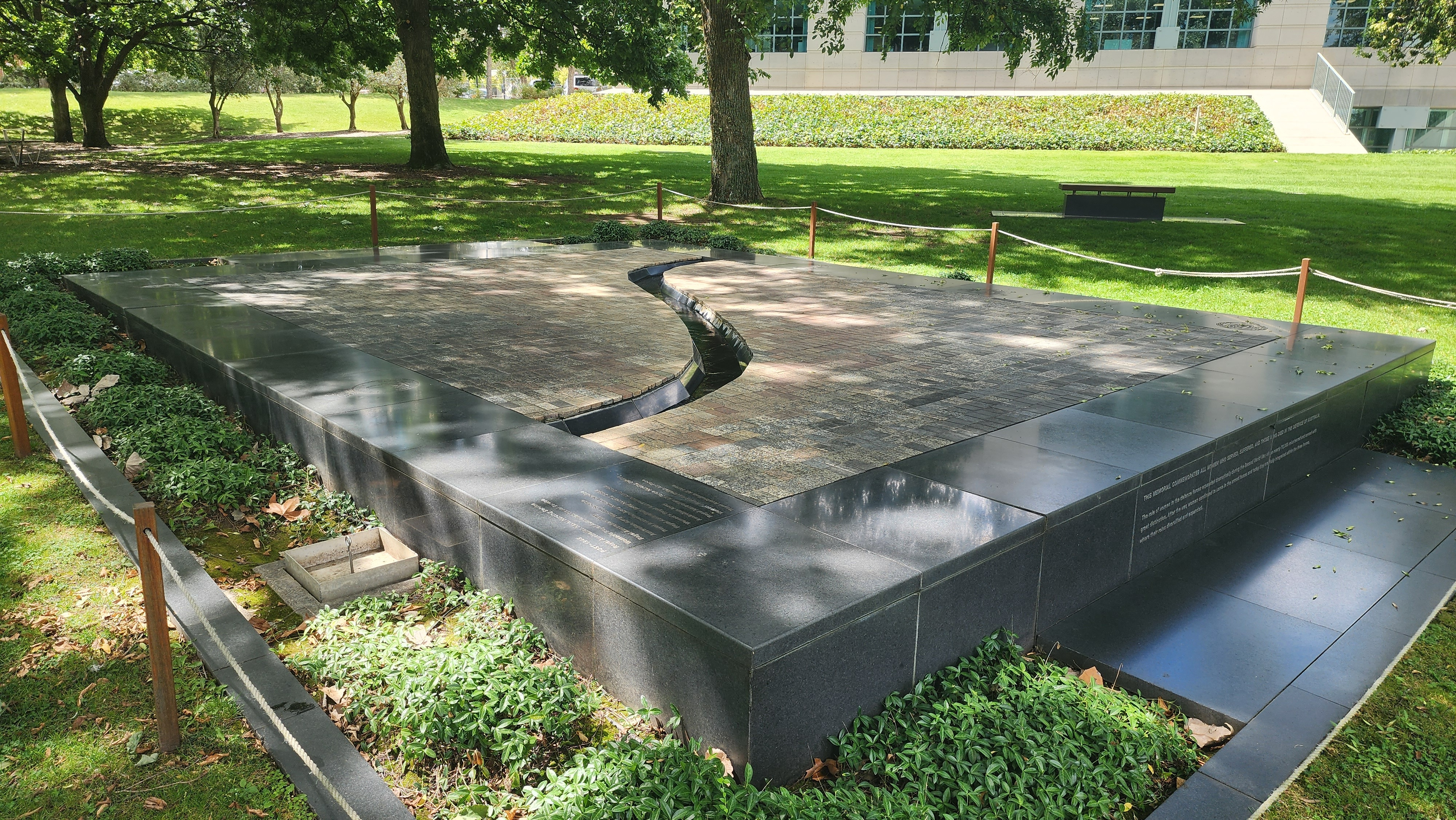
Australian Servicewomen's Memorial by Anne Ferguson

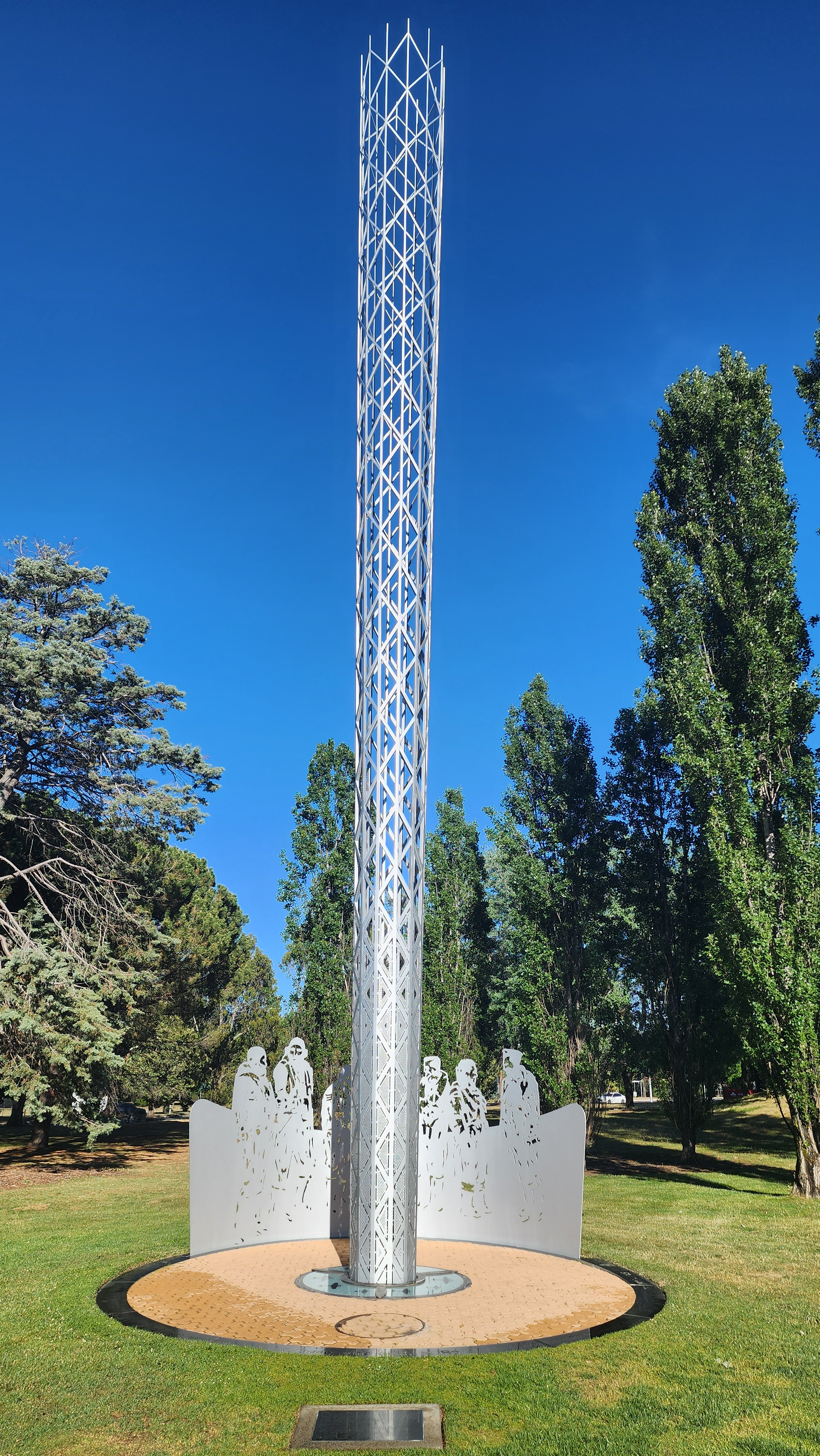
Bomber Command Memorial by Neil Dawson

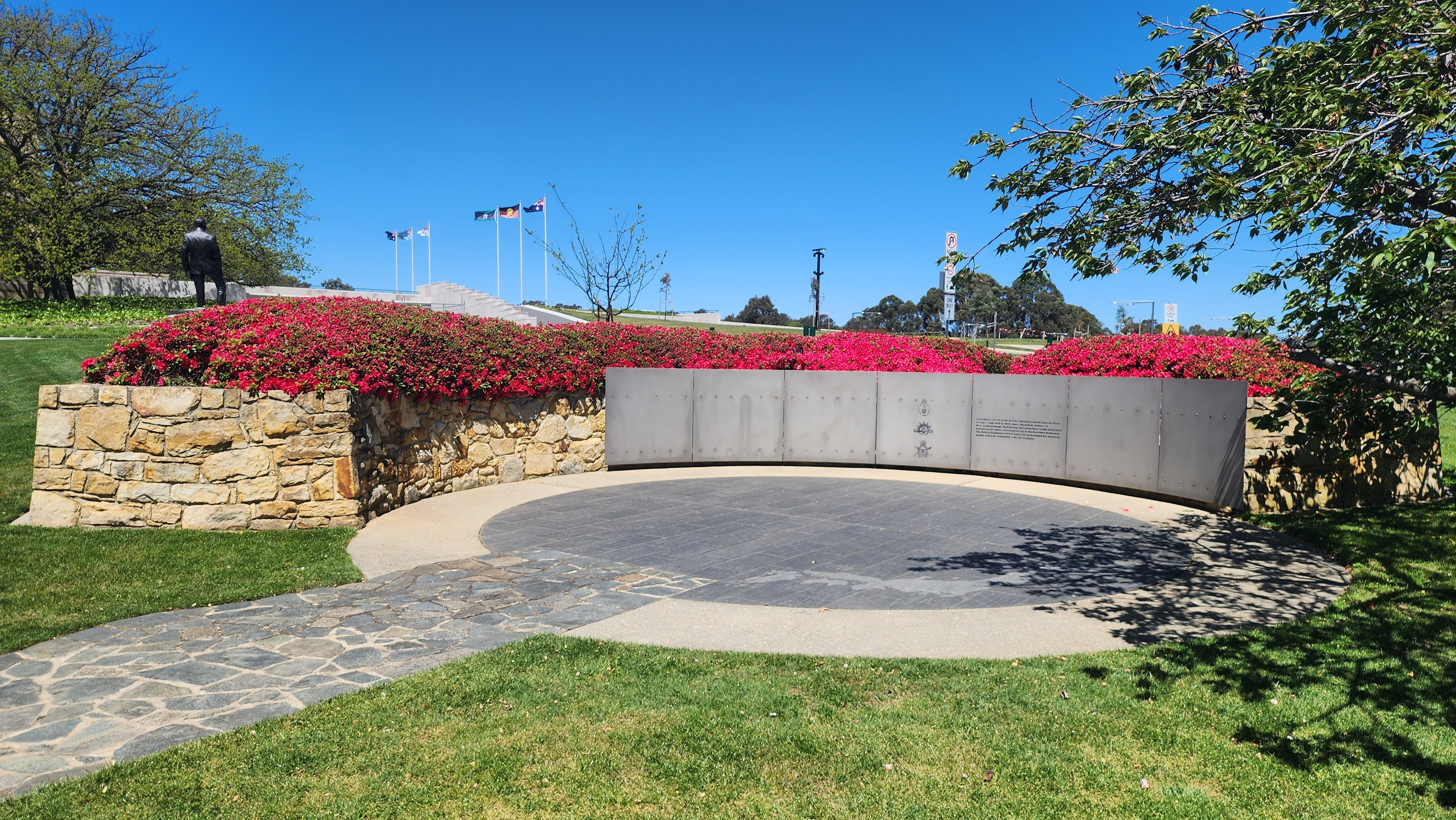
British Commonwealth Occupation Force Memorial

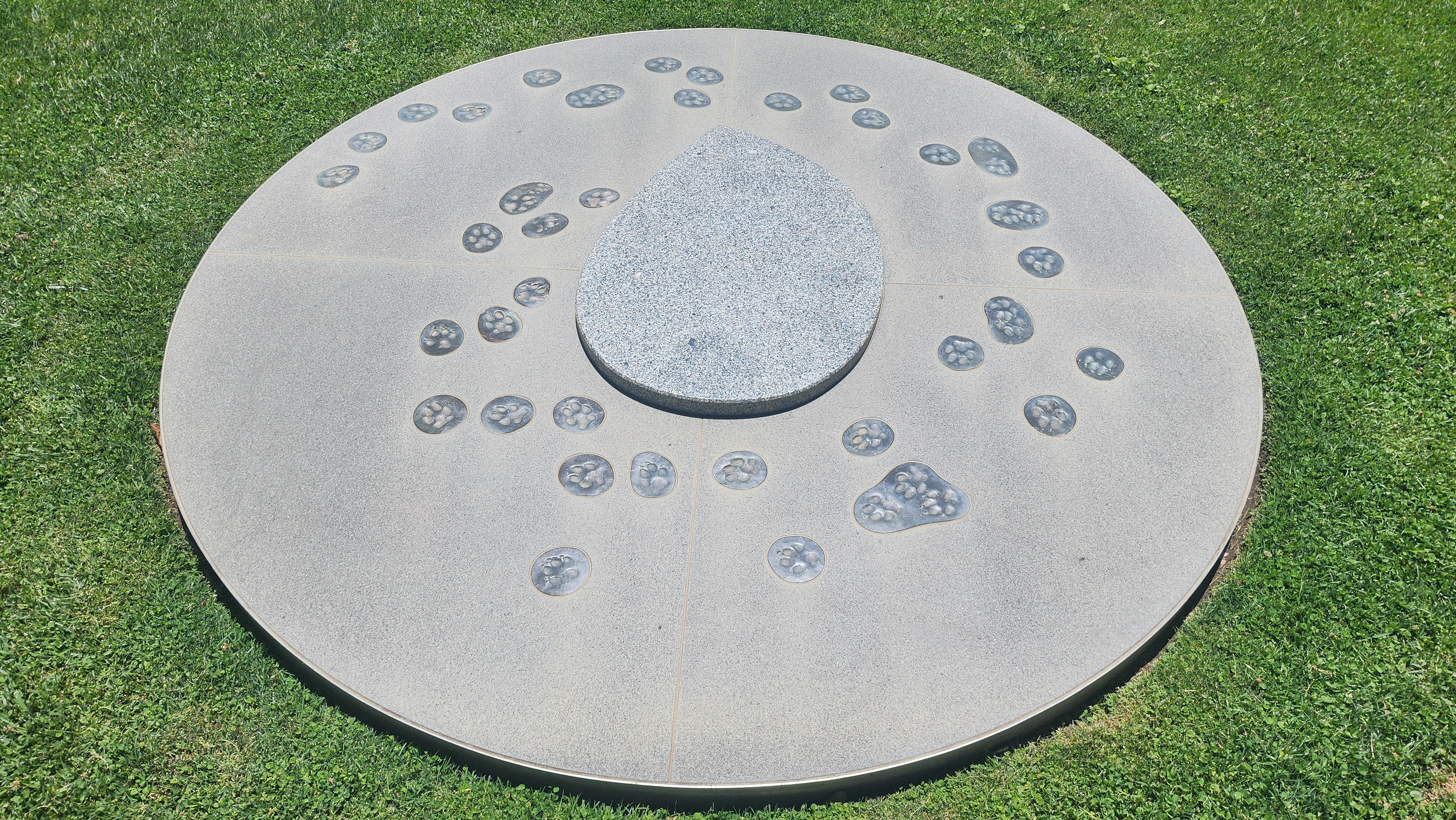
Circling Into Sleep by Steven Holland

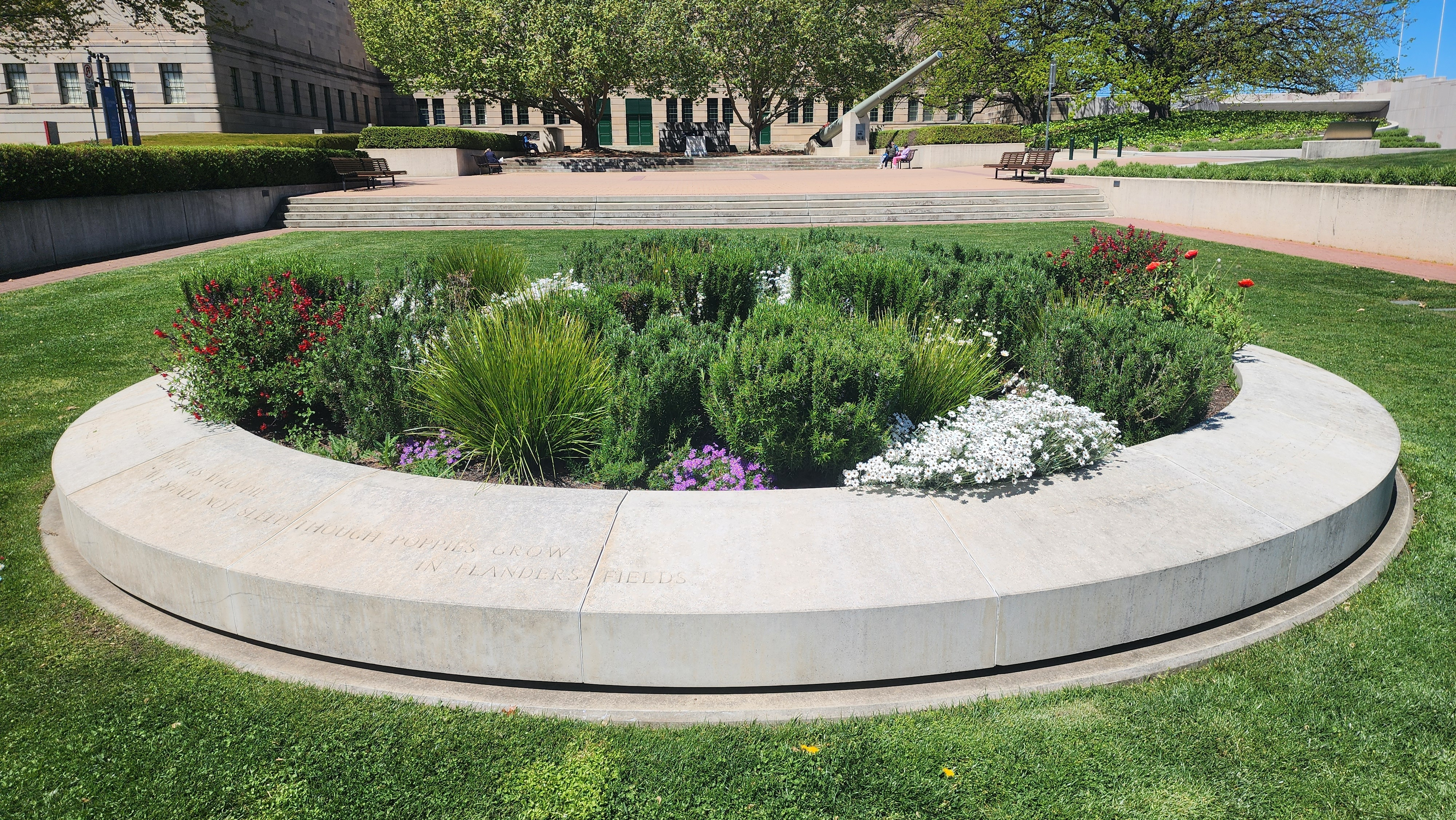
Flanders Field Memorial Garden

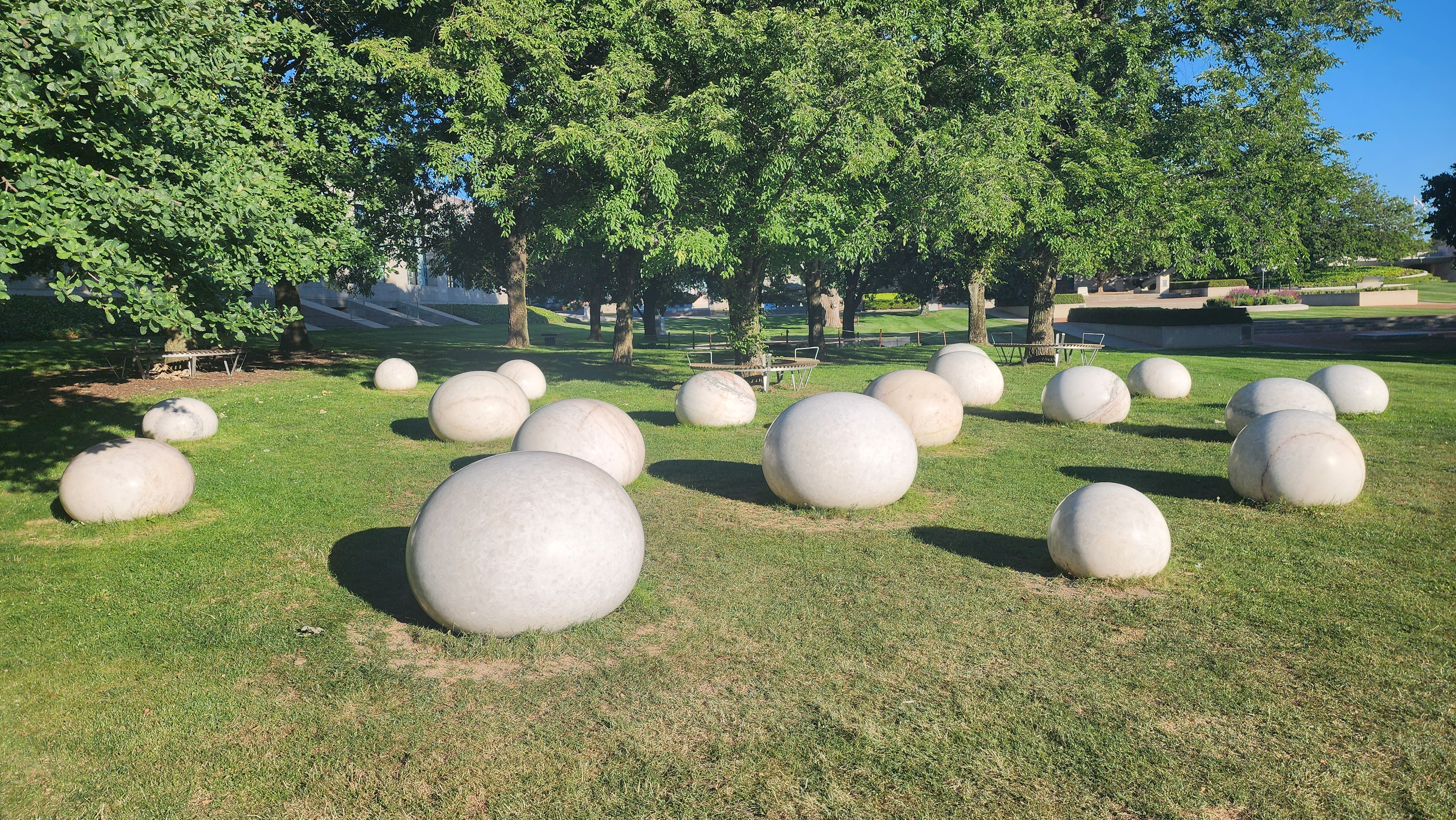
For Every Drop Shed in Anguish by Alex Seton

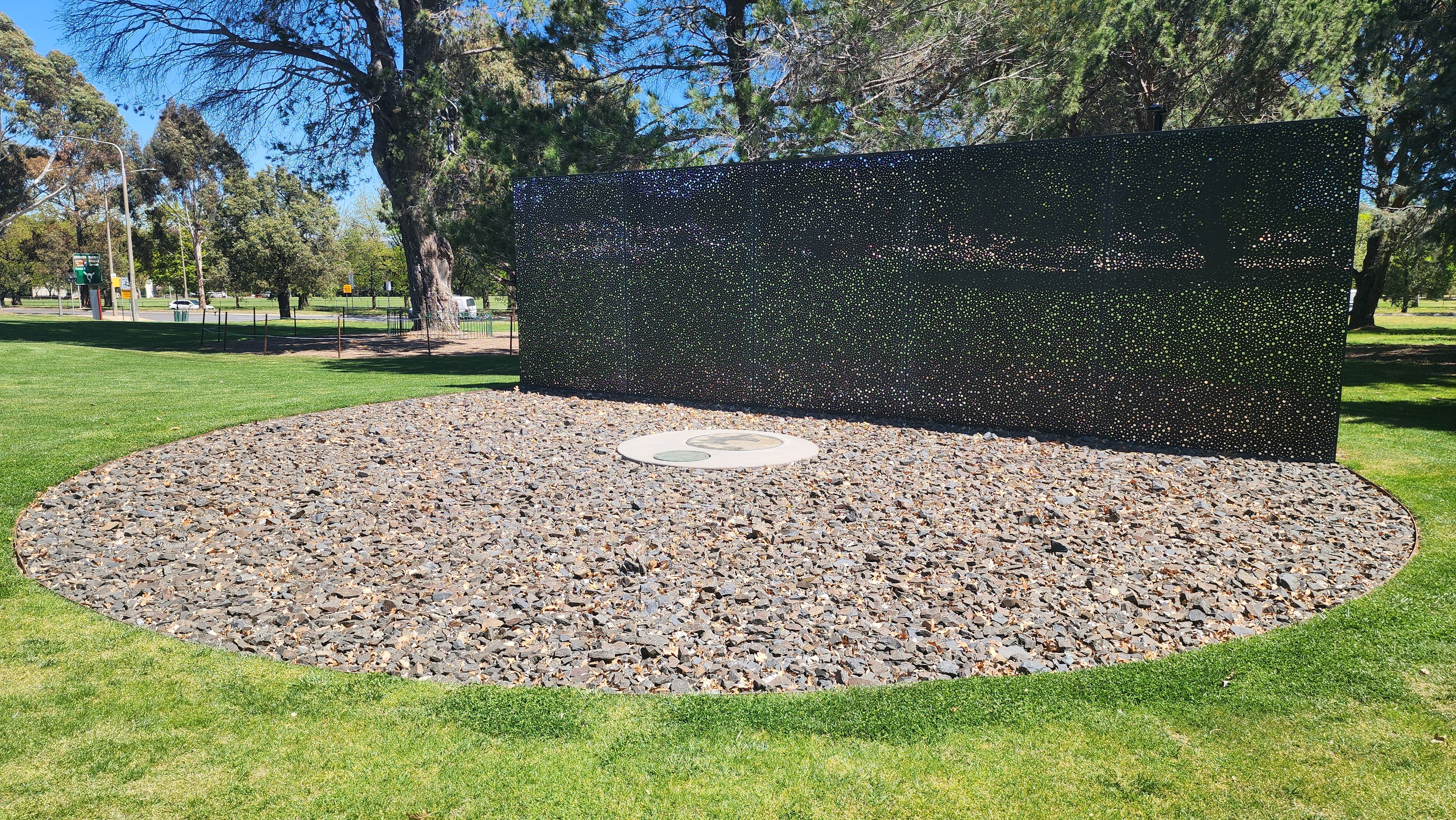
For our Country by Daniel Boyd

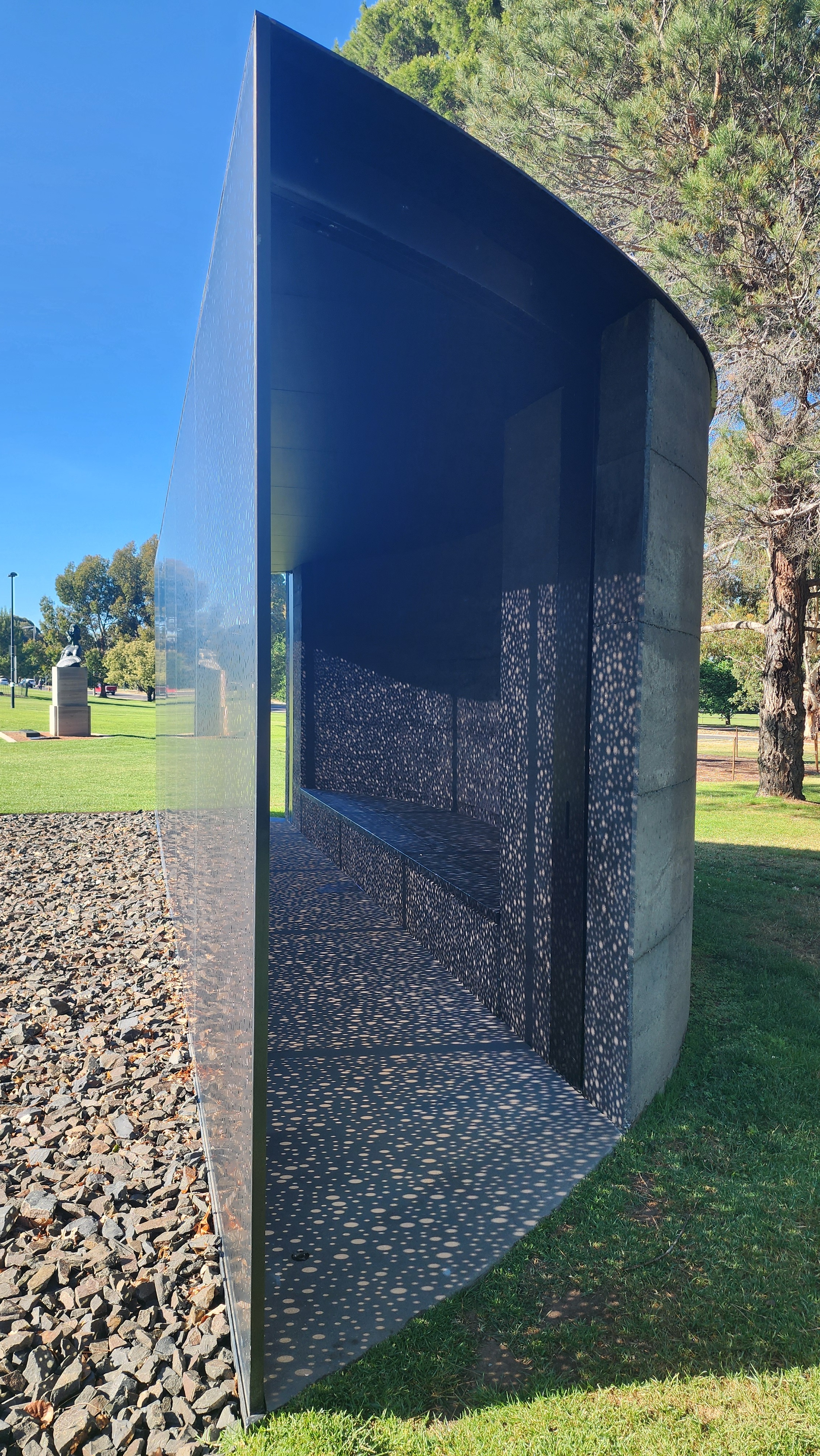
For our Country Contemplative space by Daniel Boyd

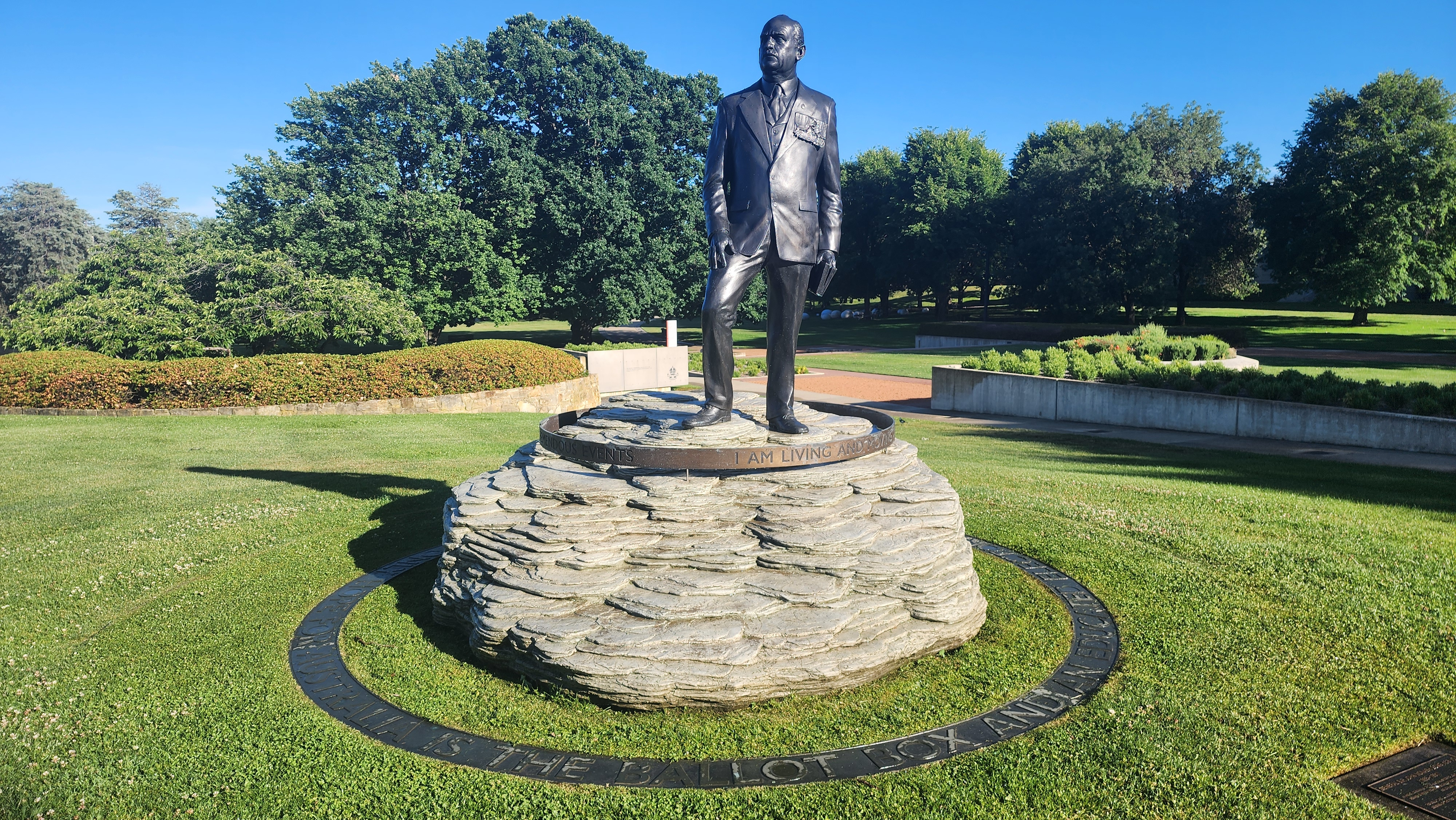
General Sir John Monash statue by Sarah Holland-Batt and Charles Robb

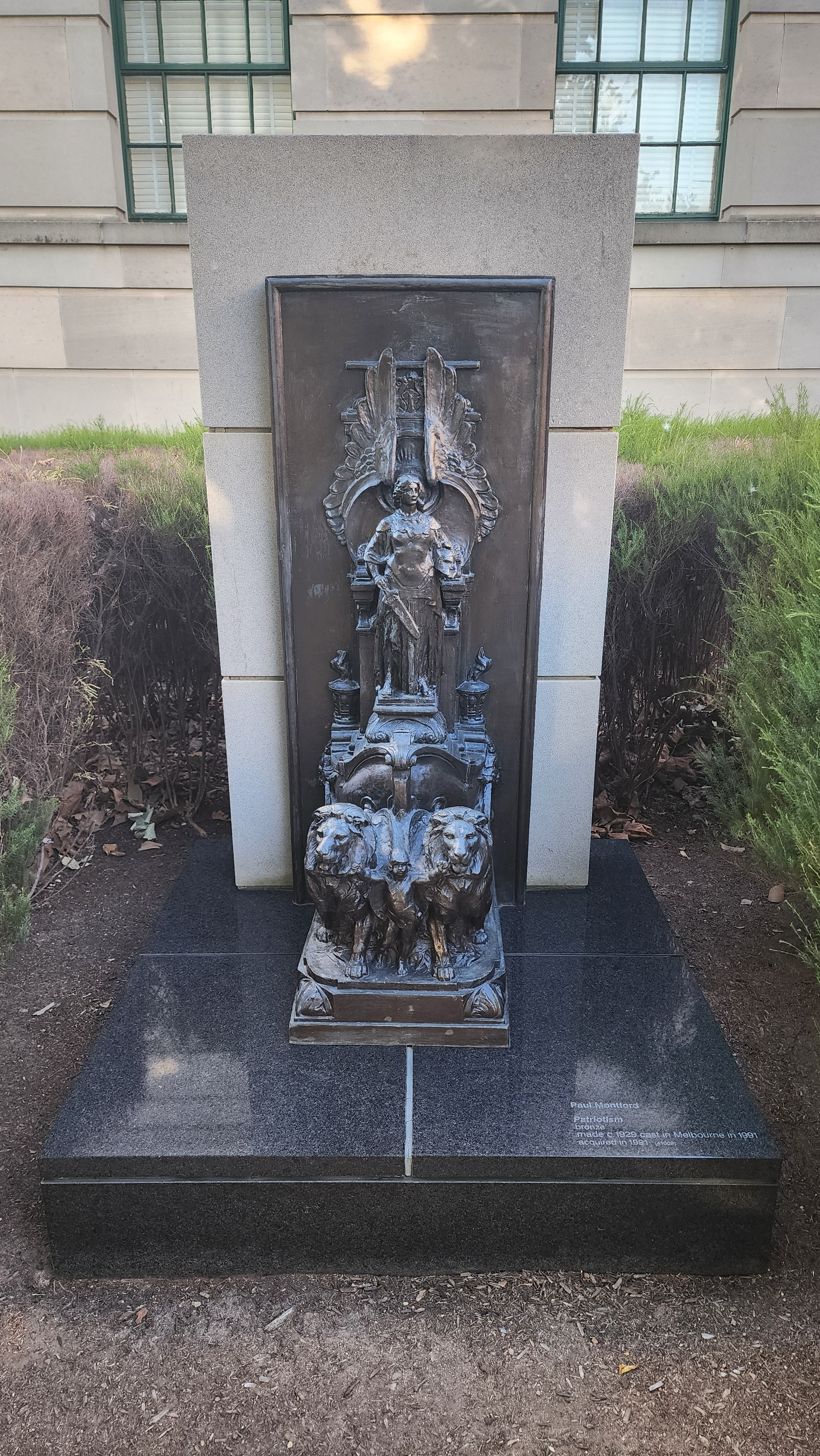
Patriotism by Paul Montford

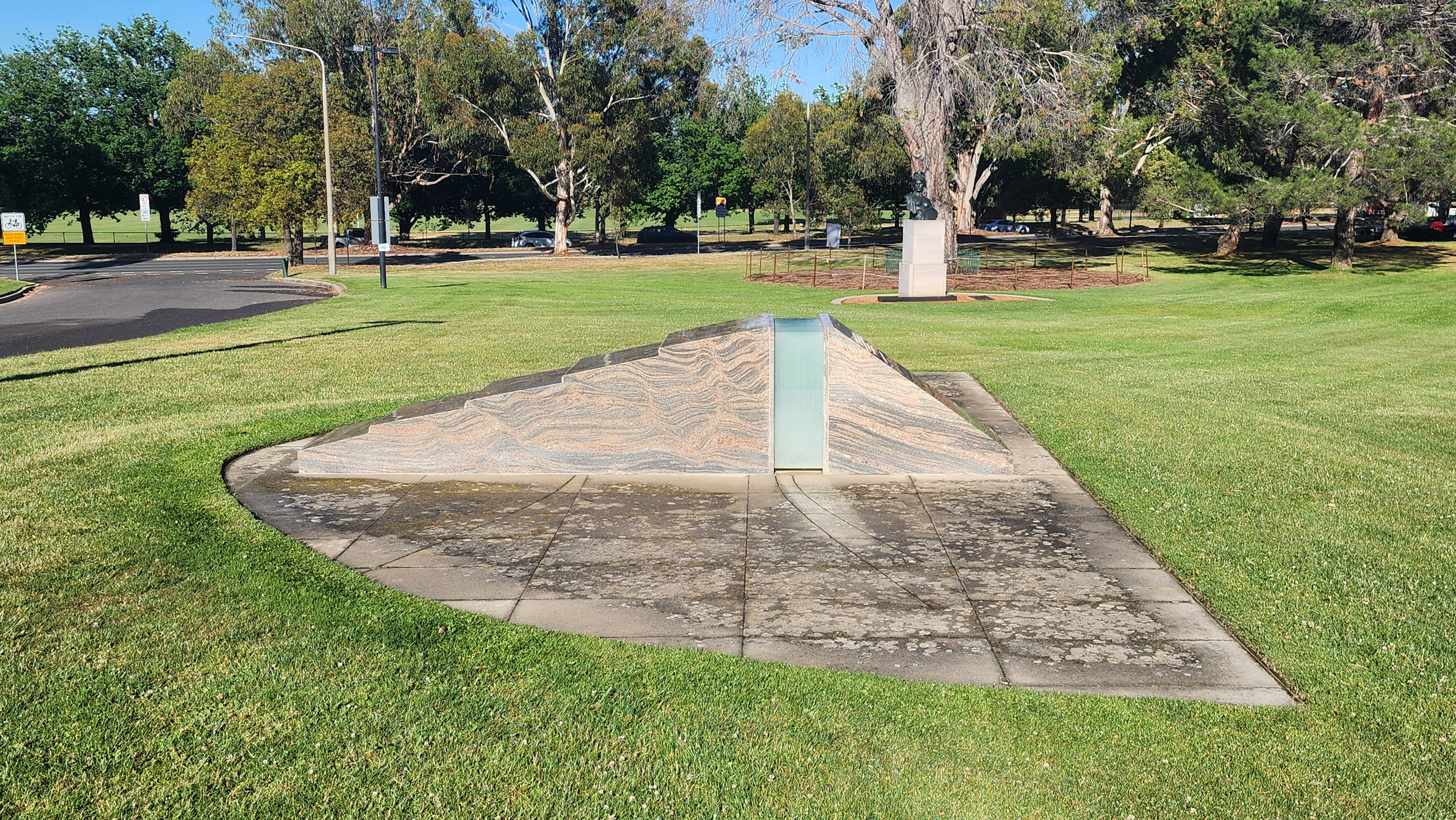
Sandakan Memorial by Anne Ferguson

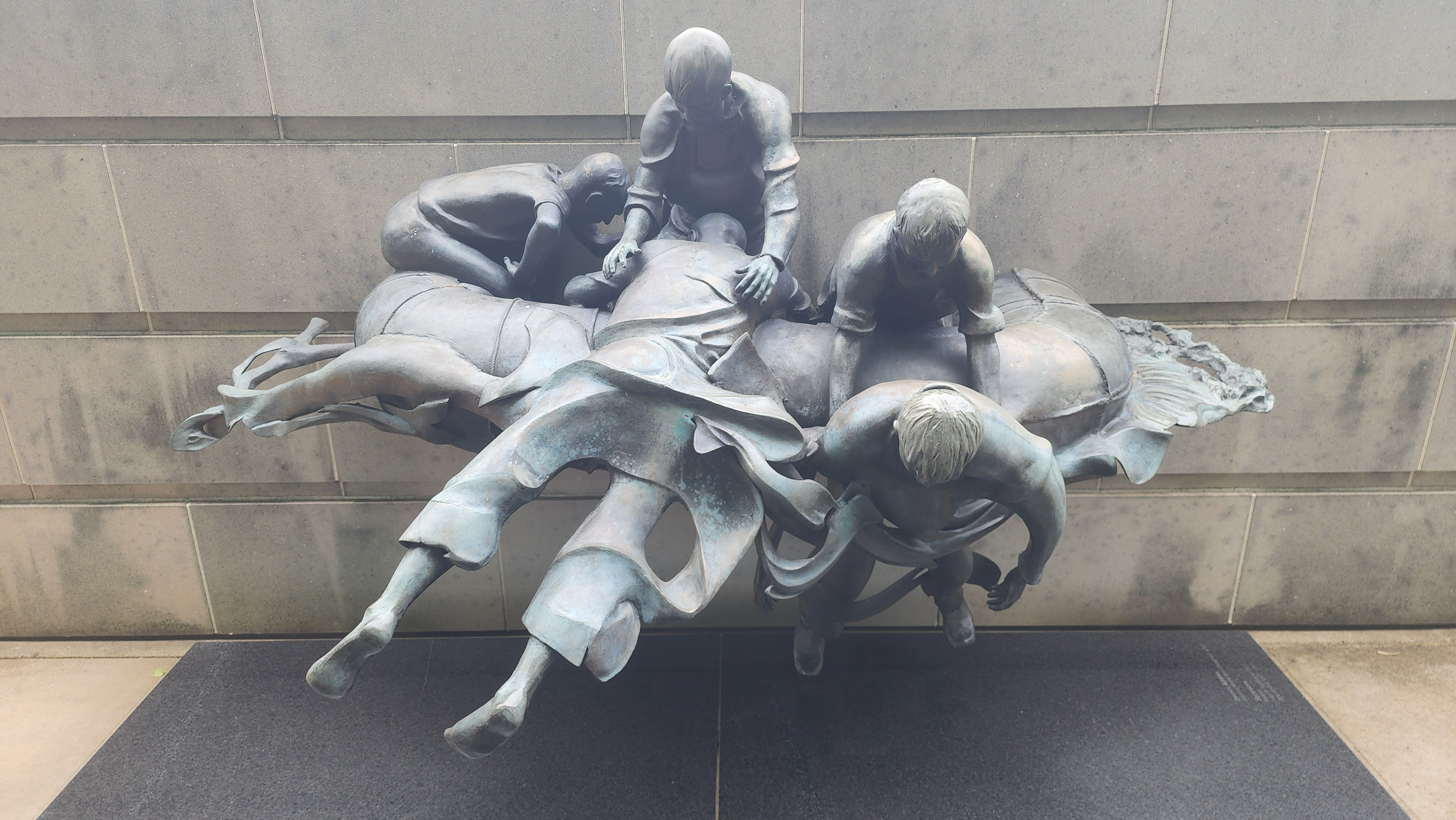
Survivors by Dennis Adams

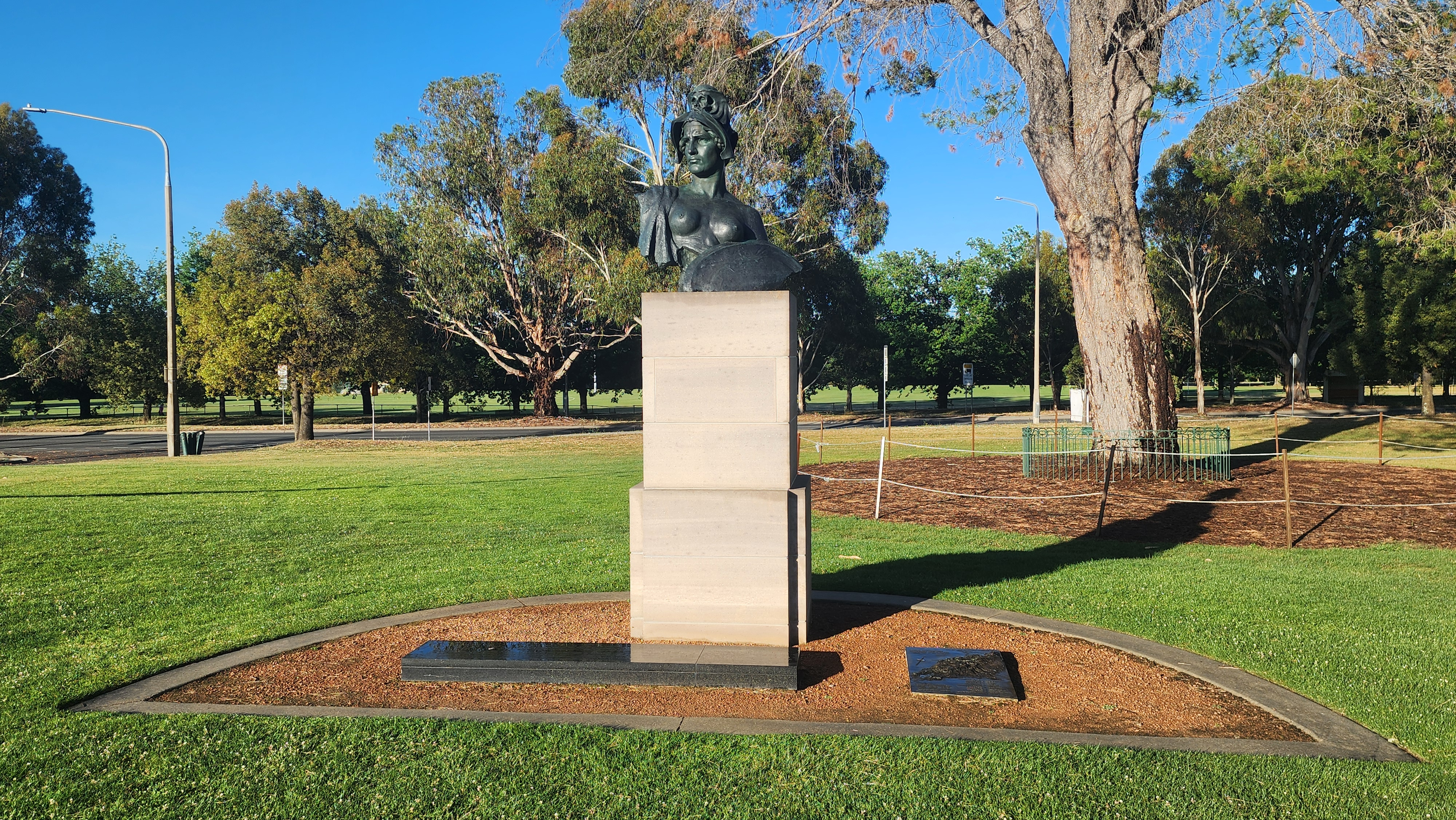
War by Bertram Mackennal

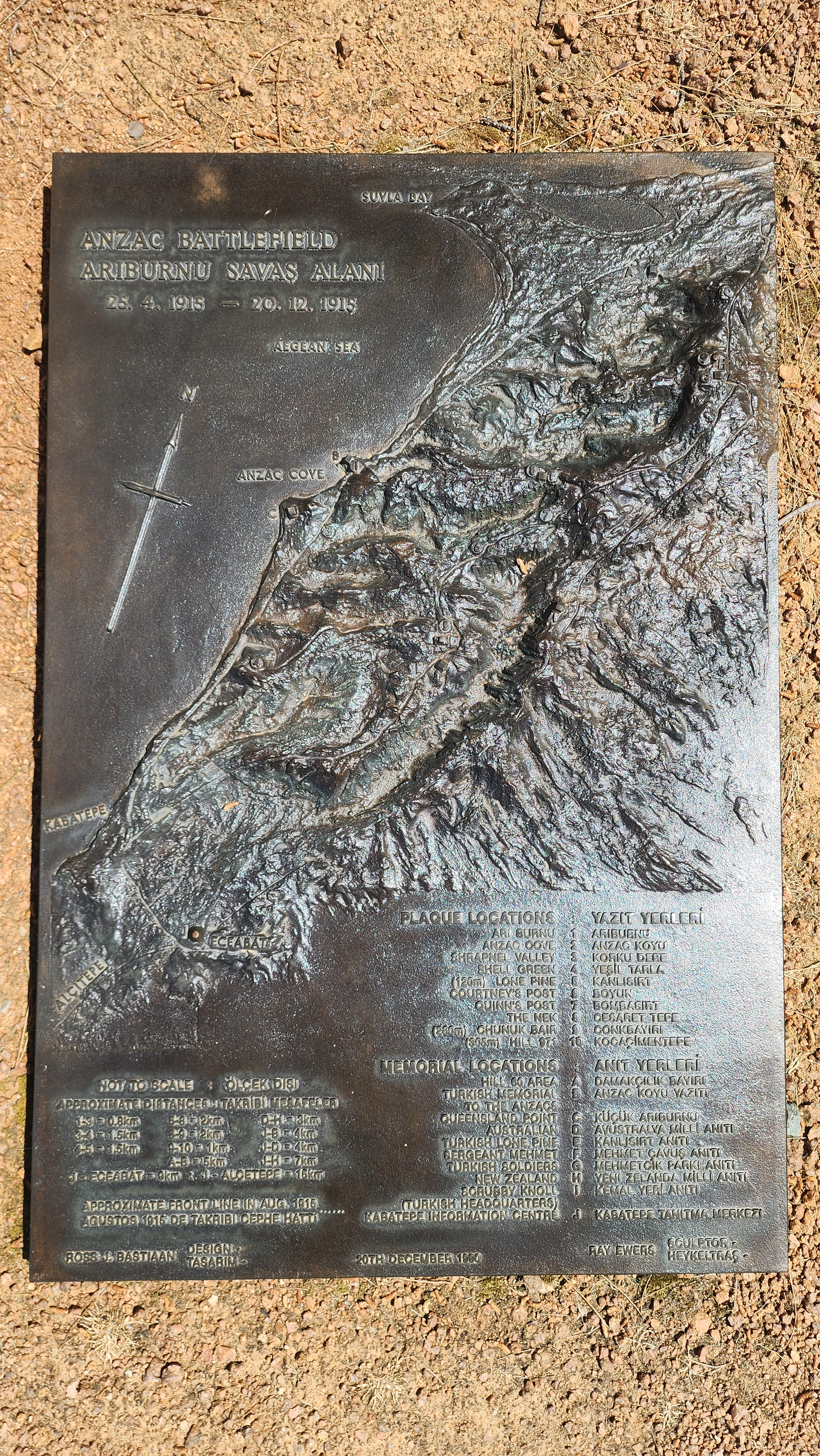
ANZAC Battlefield commemorative plaque

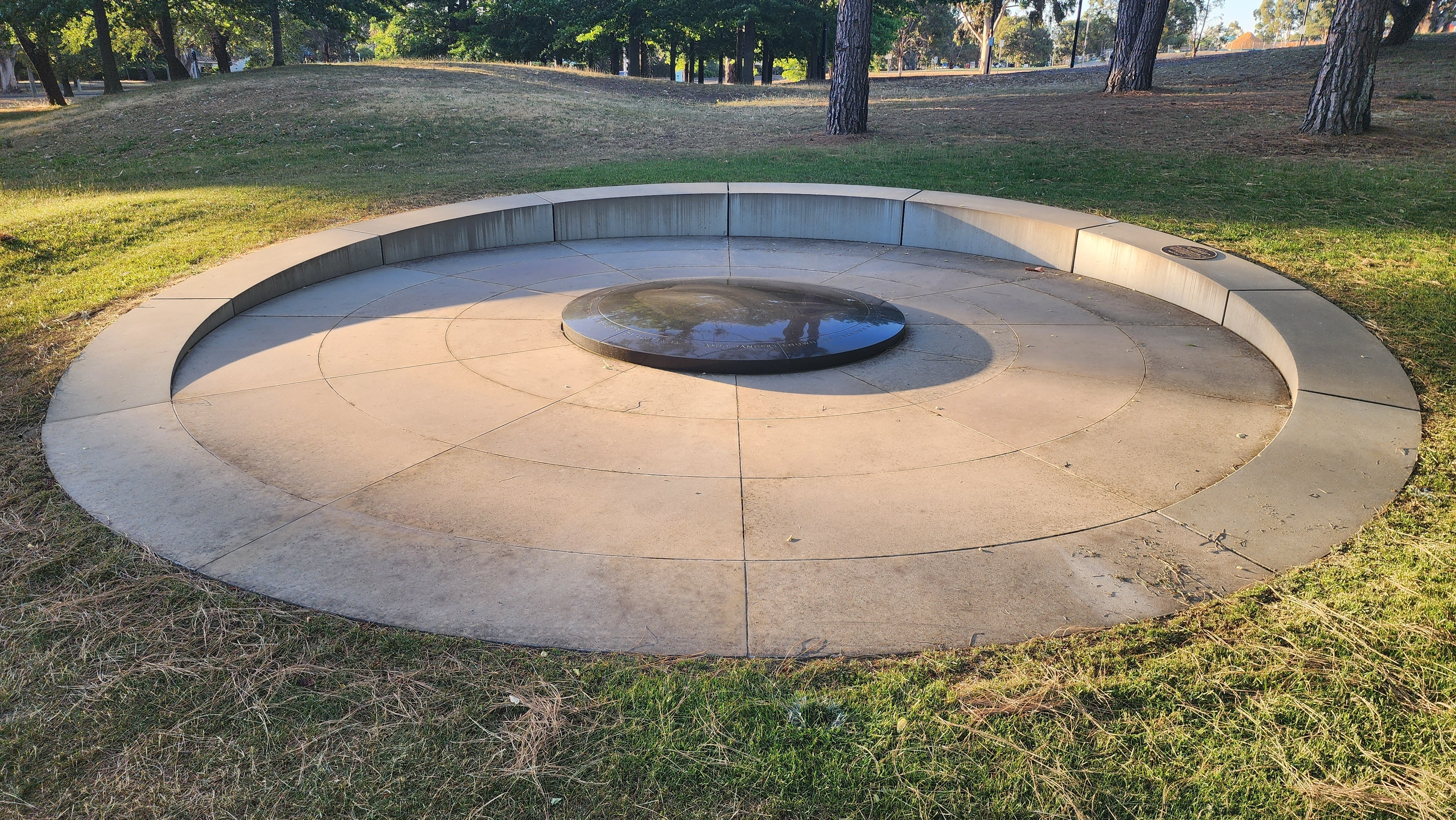
War Correspondents Memorial by Johnson Pilton Walker

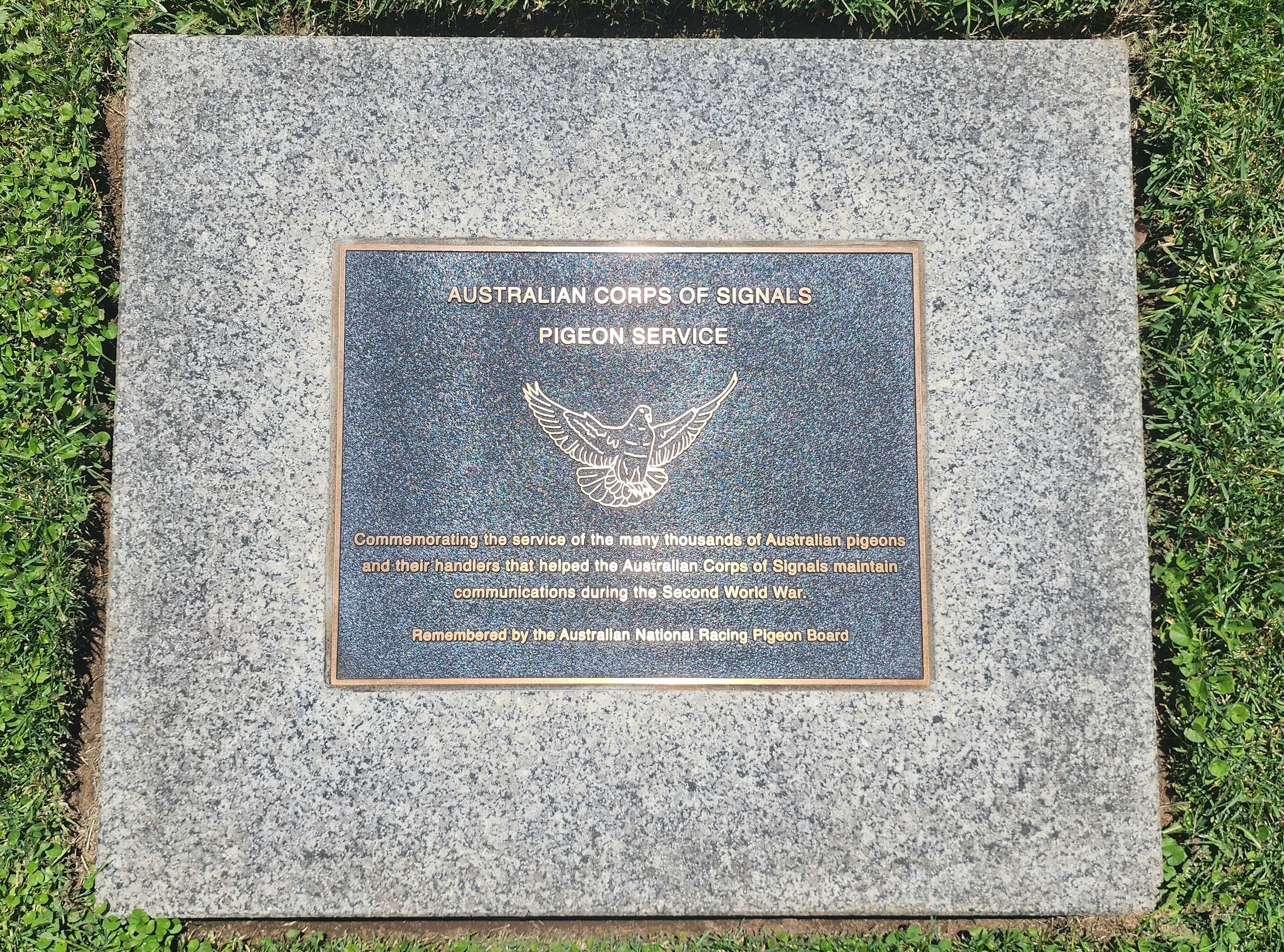
Australian Corps of Signals Pigeon Service plaque

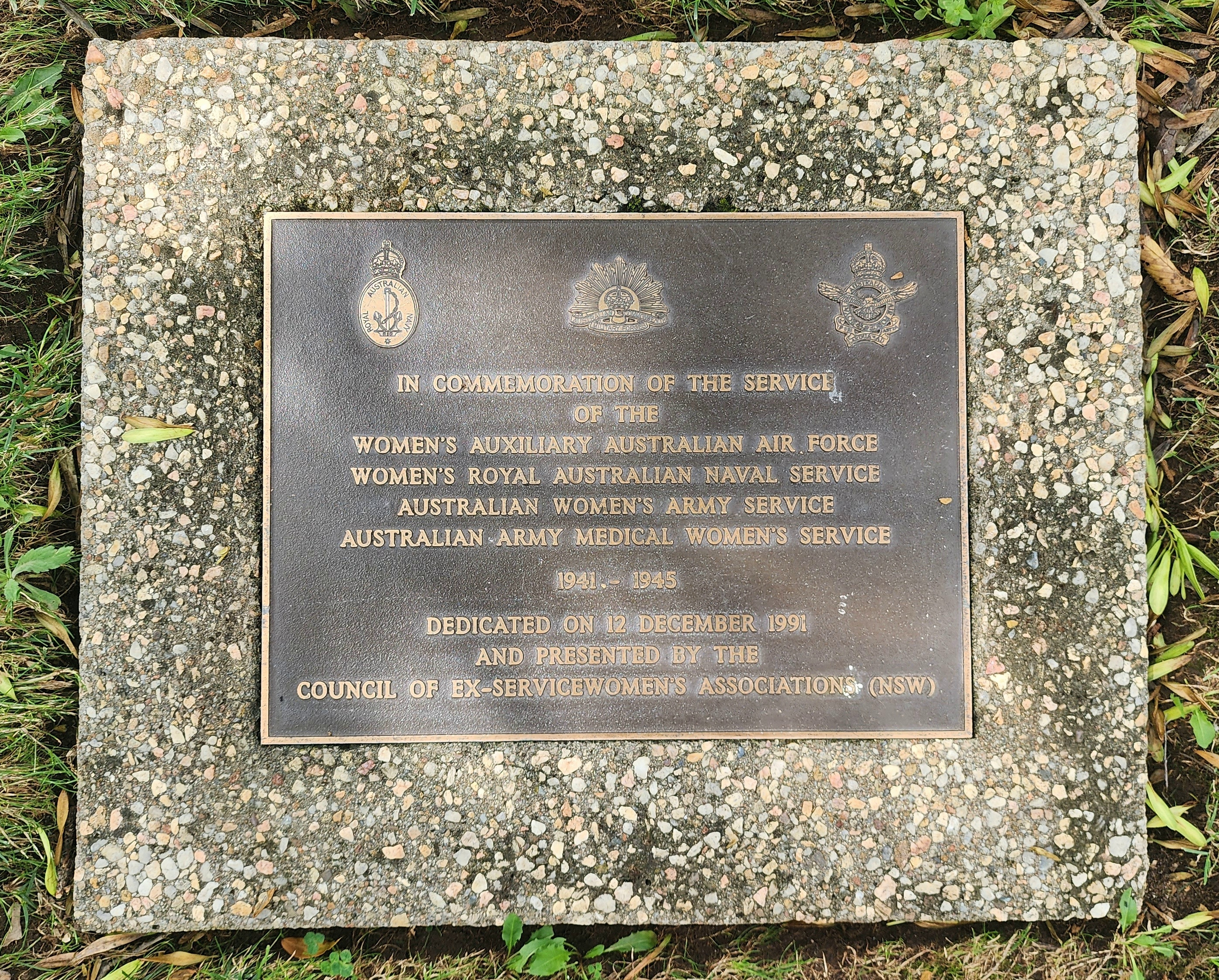
World War 2 Australian Women's Commemoration plaque

Vivian Bullwinkel by Charles Robb

Elevation of the senses by Ewen Coates (Front)

Elevation of the senses by Ewen Coates (Rear)

== Commemorative services ==
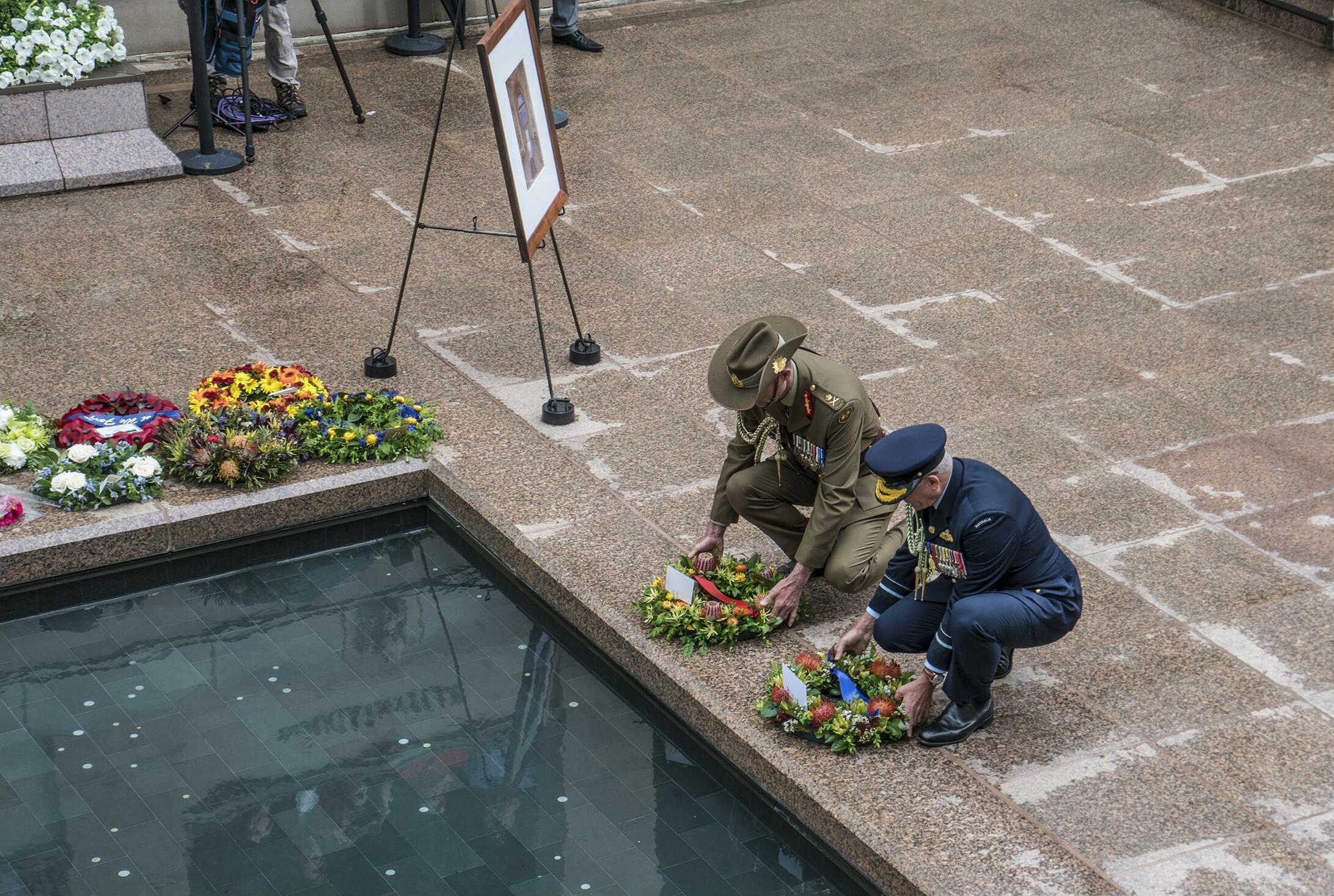
Members of the Australian Defence Force lay down a wreath next to the reflecting pool during the Last Post ceremony.

The Australian War Memorial organises a nightly commemorative service known as the Last Post service, as well as two national services for Anzac Day and Remembrance Day each year.

=== Last Post ceremony ===
The Last Post ceremony was a tradition that began in 2013 and occurs each day 16:45 AEDT. The ceremony begins with the singing of the Australian National Anthem, followed by a piper descending from the Hall of Memory. Visitors are then invited to lay wreaths and floral tributes beside the reflecting pool. A story about an individual on the memorial's Roll of Honour is then read aloud by a volunteer from the Australian Defence Force. The ceremony then concludes with the sounding of the Last Post. The ceremony typically lasts under 30 minutes.

== Off-site storage facility ==
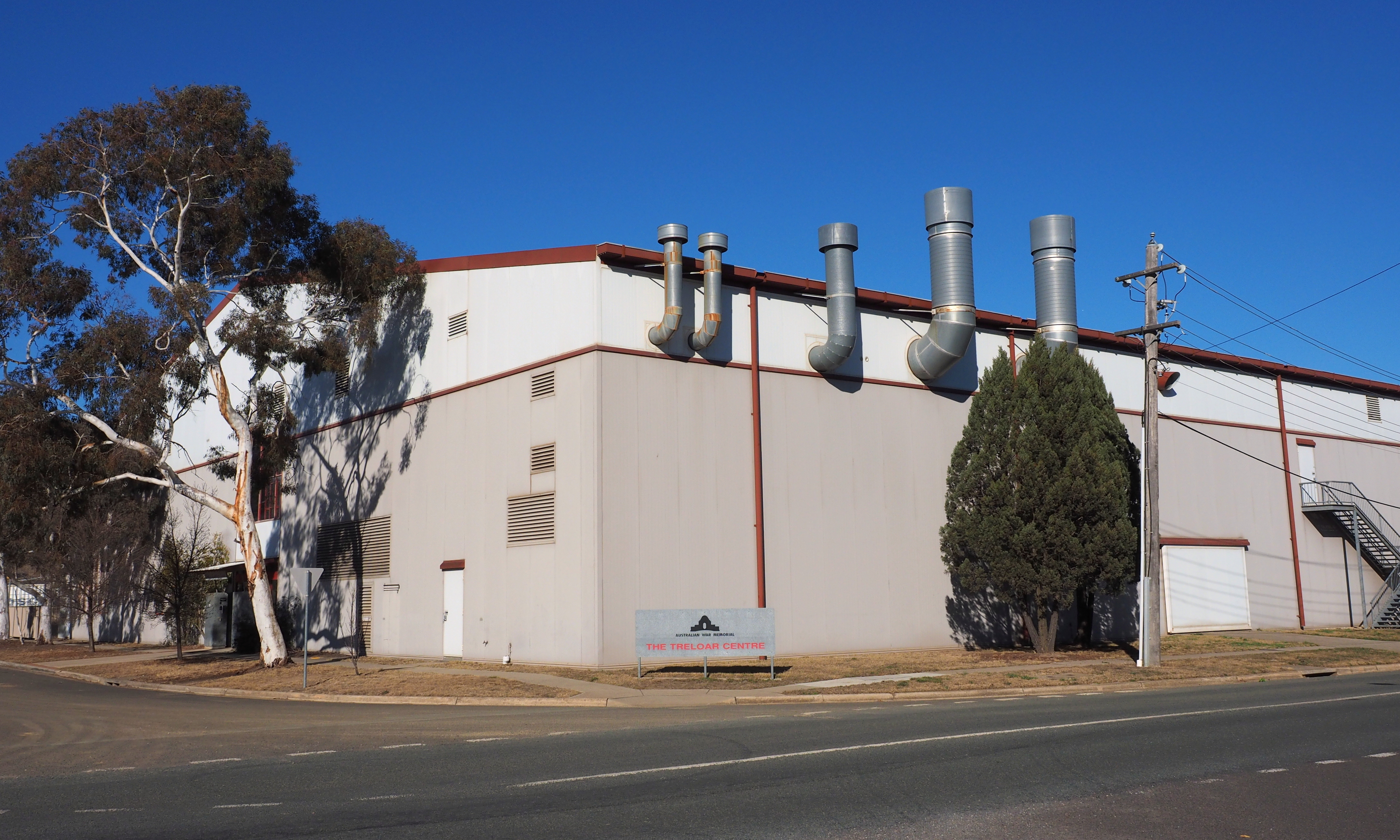
Treloar Resource Centre, the AWM's off-site conservation and storage facility

Only five percent of the AWM's collection is displayed at any time, with the remainder being stored at the Treloar Resource Centre in the industrial suburb of Mitchell. The facility also includes workshops that are used for restoration tasks. The facility is occasionally opened to the public for "Big Things in Store" open days.

== Publications ==
The memorial played a key role in sponsoring the official histories that were produced for World War I, World War II, Korea and Vietnam. In addition, the memorial currently produces a quarterly magazine called Wartime. Featuring images from the memorial's collection and articles written by established historians, according to the AWM, the magazine is "devoted to the Australian experience of war; military history; and the effects of war on society". The magazine's first issue was published in November 1997.

The memorial also previously published a journal titled The Journal of the Australian War Memorial (ISSN 1327-0141). In October 2003, after publishing 39 issues, the journal went into hiatus, although a fortieth and final issue was published in January 2007.

== See also ==
- List of Australian military memorials
- List of Korean War memorials
- List of military museums
- Lists of war monuments and memorials
- Man in the mud, a diorama at the AWM
- World War I memorials

== Notes and references ==
=== Sources ===
- McKernan, Michael (1991). Here Is Their Spirit: A History of the Australian War Memorial 1917–1990. University of Queensland Press. ISBN 0-7022-2413-8.
- "Australian War Memorial: Heritage Management Plan (AWM:MHMP)" (PDF). Australian War Memorial. March 2022.
