= Mentone, Victoria =

Mentone
- Suburb
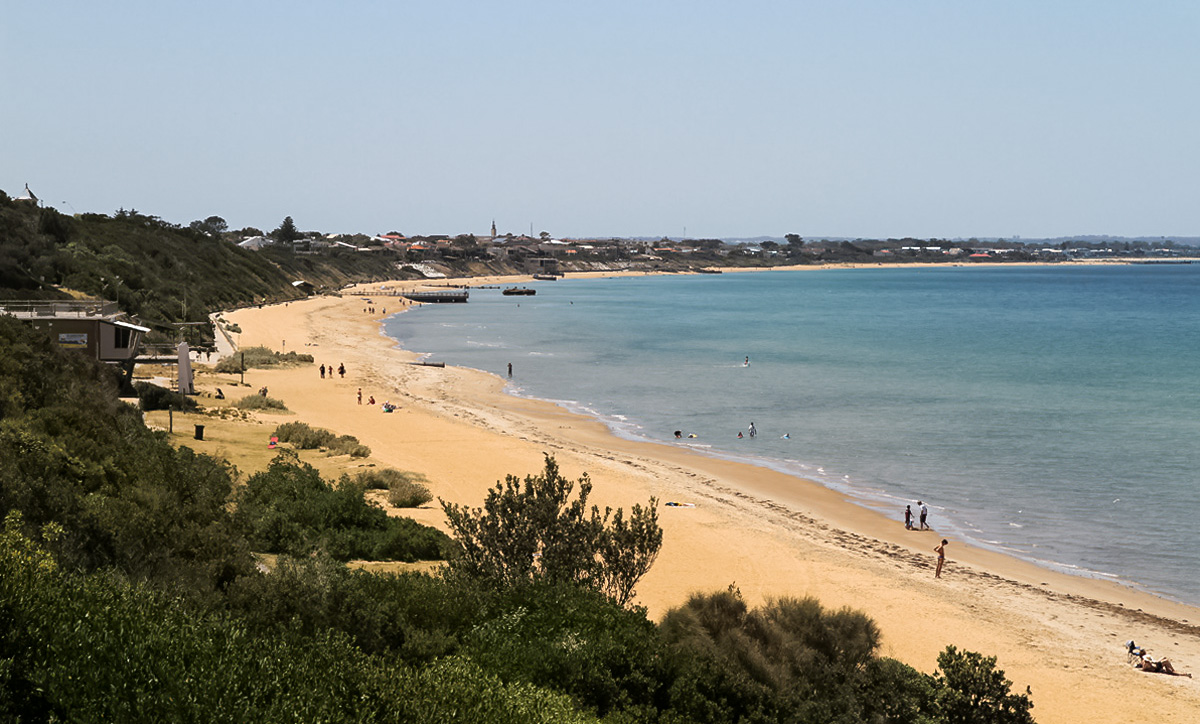
- Mentone Beach

- Interactive map of Mentone
- Coordinates: 37°59′06″S 145°04′08″E
- Country: Australia
- State: Victoria
- City: Melbourne
- LGA: City of Kingston
- Location: 21 km (13 mi) from Melbourne

Government
  - State electorates: Mordialloc; Sandringham; Clarinda
  - Federal division: Isaacs

Area
  - Total: 4.7 km^{2} (1.8 sq mi)
- Elevation: 21 m (69 ft)

Population
  - Total: 13,197 (2021 census)
  - Density: 2,808/km^{2} (7,270/sq mi)
- Postcode: 3194
Suburbs around Mentone
Cheltenham	Cheltenham	Moorabbin Airport
Beaumaris	Mentone	Parkdale
Port Phillip	Port Phillip	Parkdale

Mentone is a suburb in Melbourne, Victoria, Australia, 21 km south-east of Melbourne's Central Business District, located within the City of Kingston local government area. Mentone recorded a population of 13,197 at the 2021 census.

It is known locally for Mentone Beach, which extends alongside Beaumaris Bay from the cliffs in Beaumaris and ends at Warrigal Road where it meets Parkdale.

Mentone is associated with the Heidelberg School of Australian artists.

== History ==
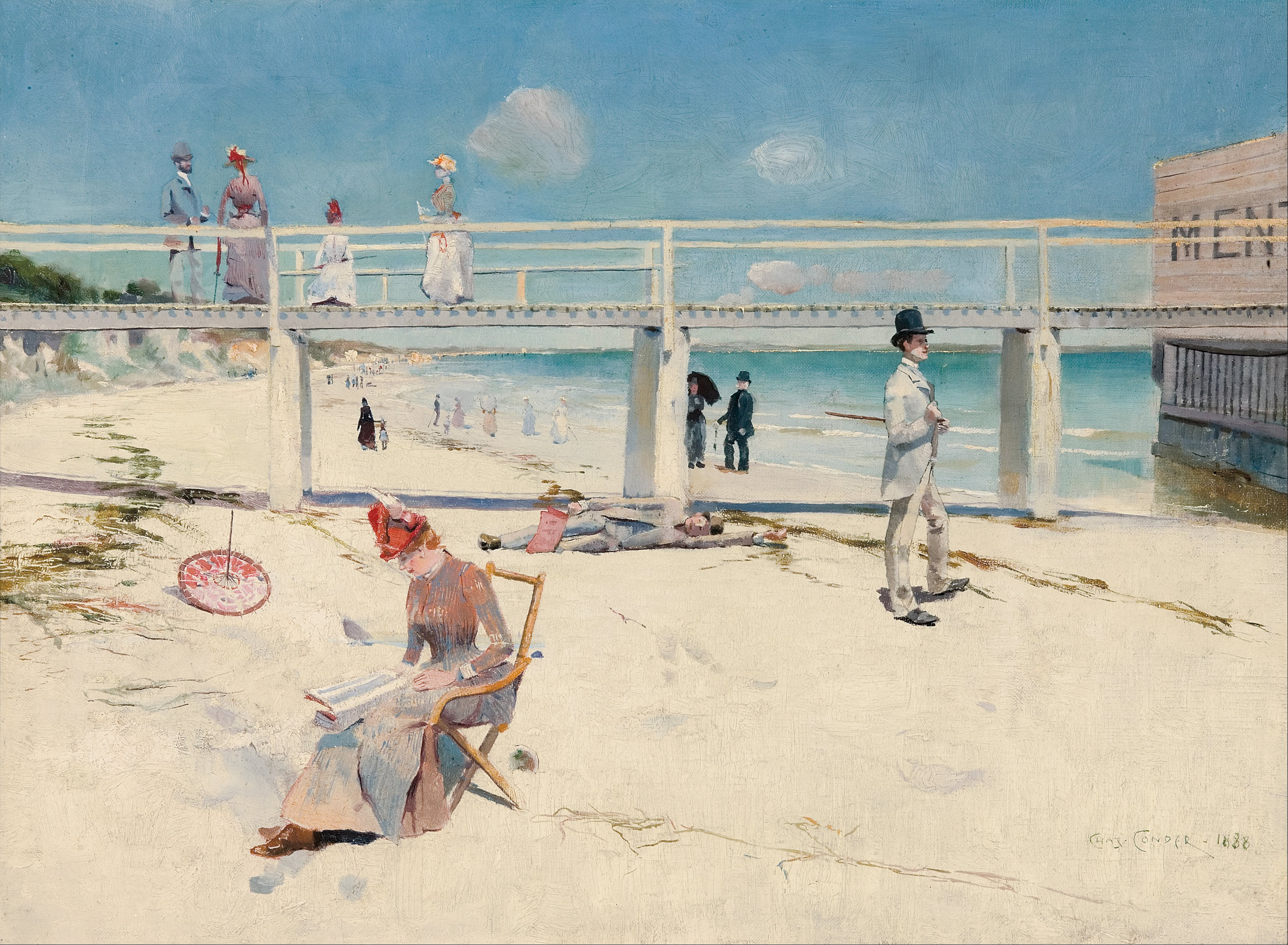
A holiday at Mentone, 1888, oil on canvas by Charles Conder.

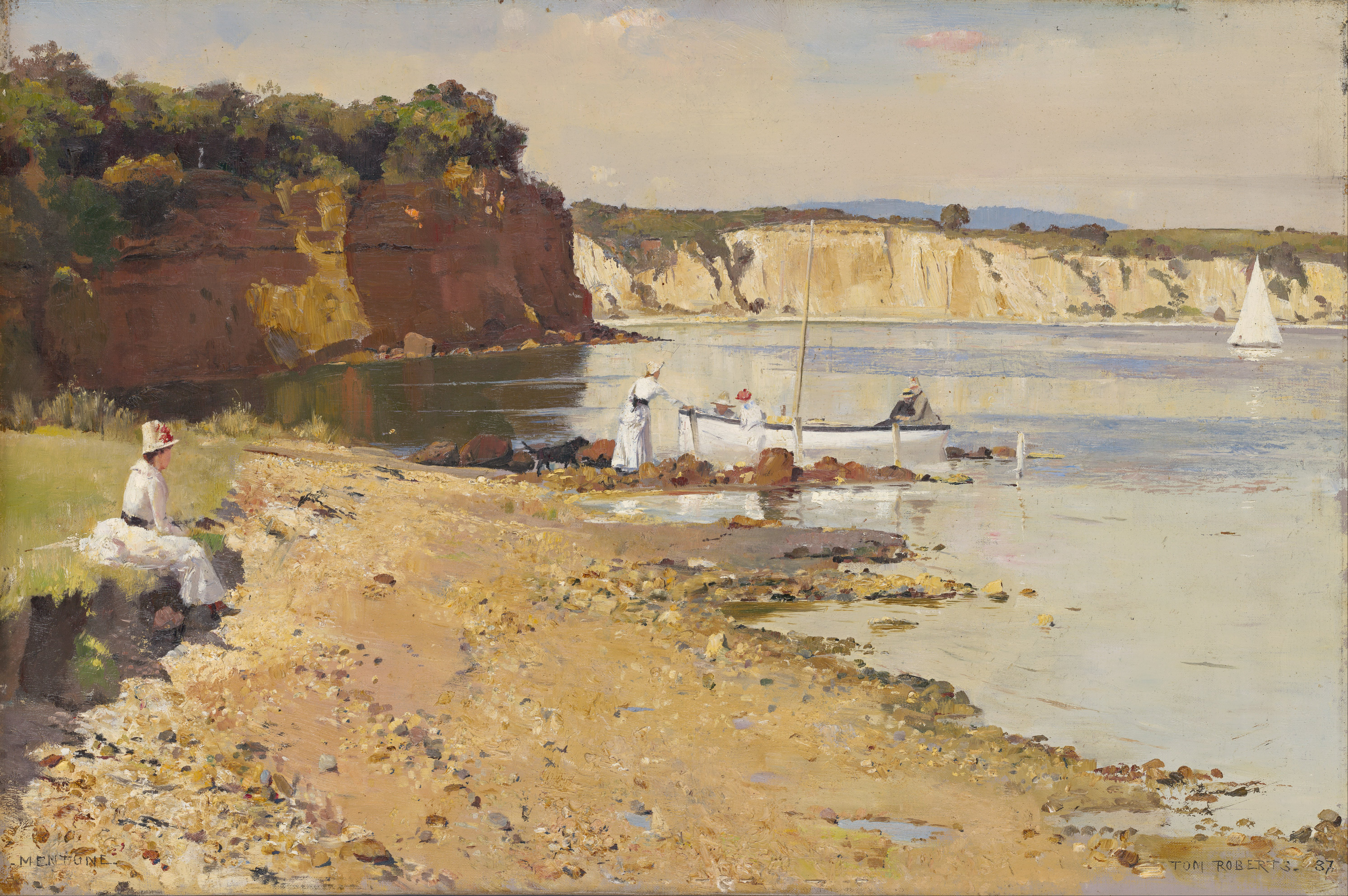
Tom Roberts, Slumbering Sea, Mentone (1887) National Gallery of Victoria

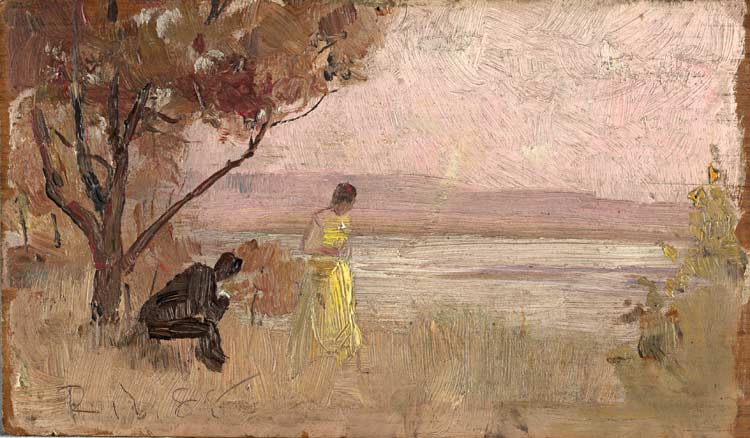
Tom Roberts, Mentone, (1889), National Gallery of Victoria.

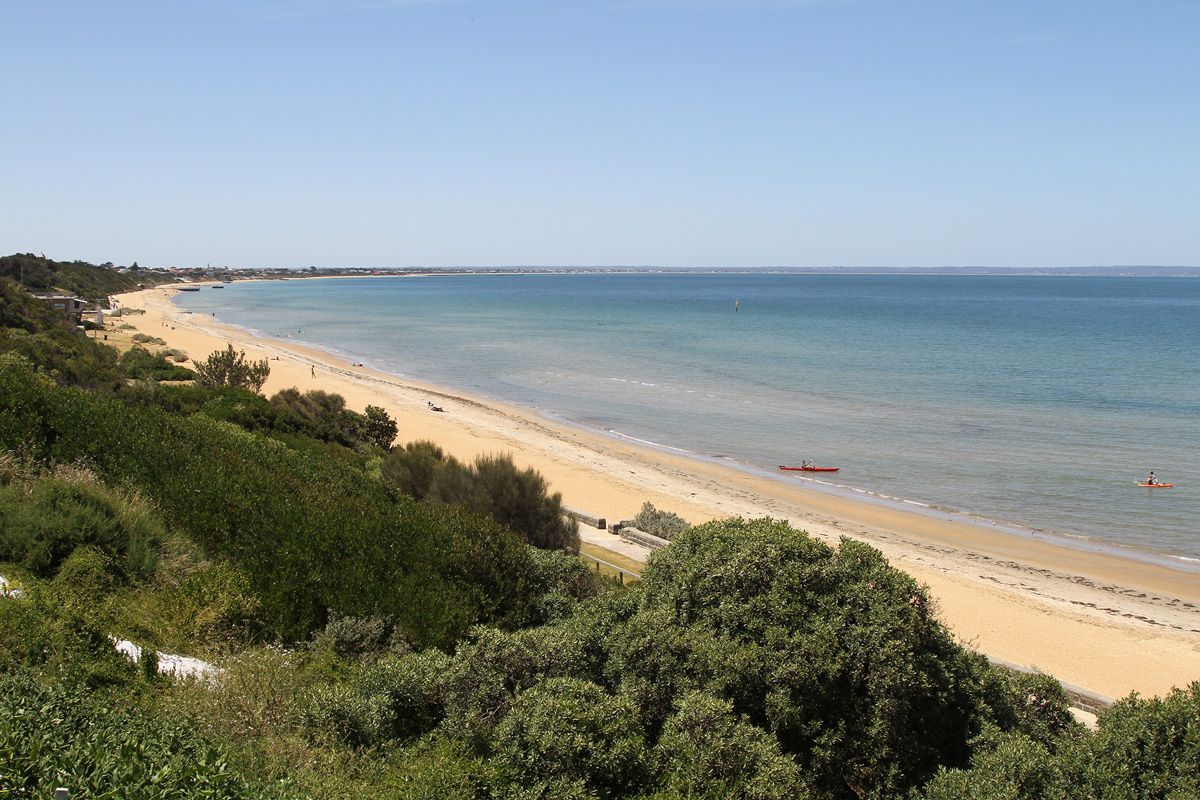
Looking south-east over Mentone Beach and Beaumaris Bay

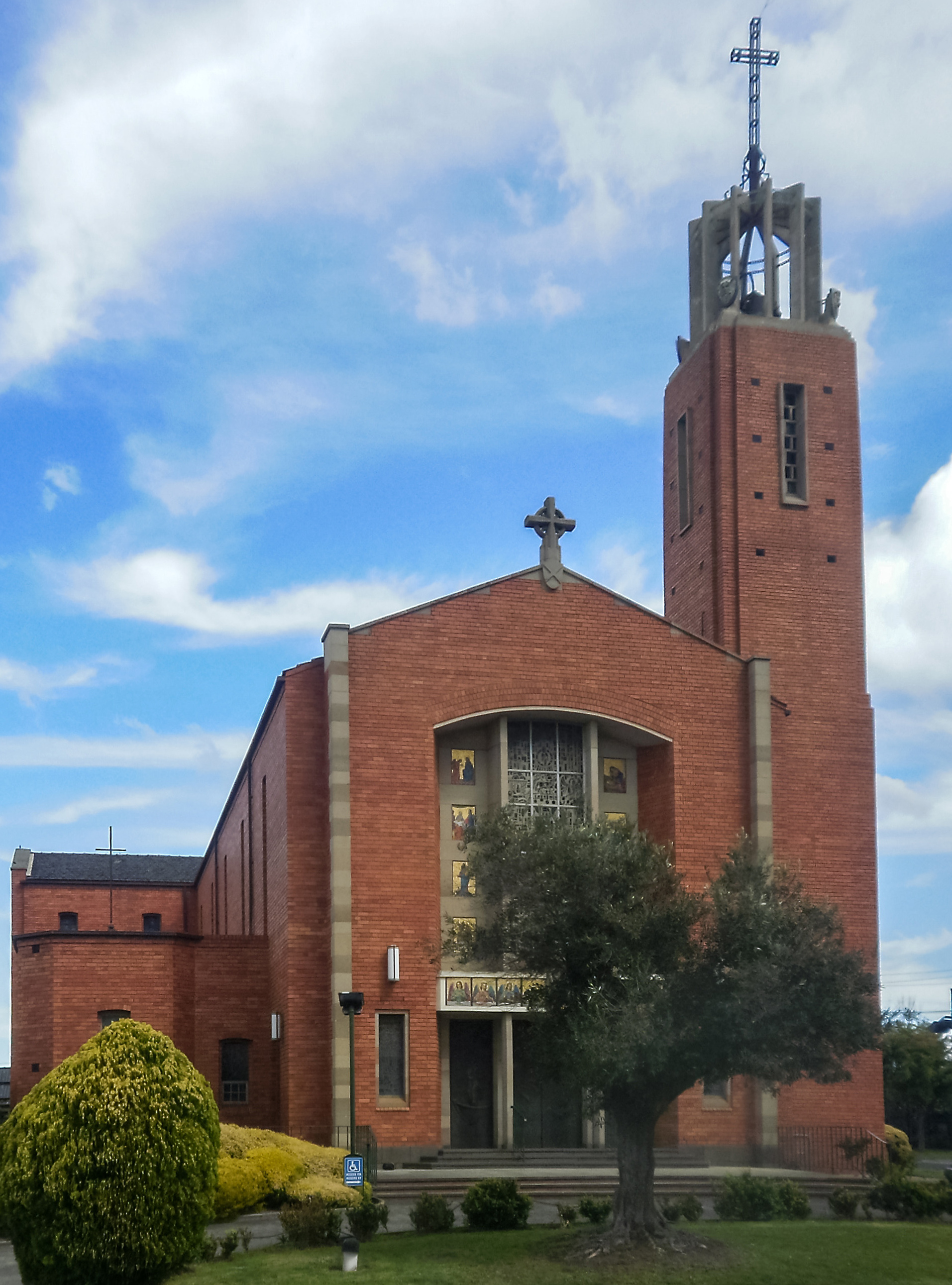
St Patricks Catholic Church Mentone

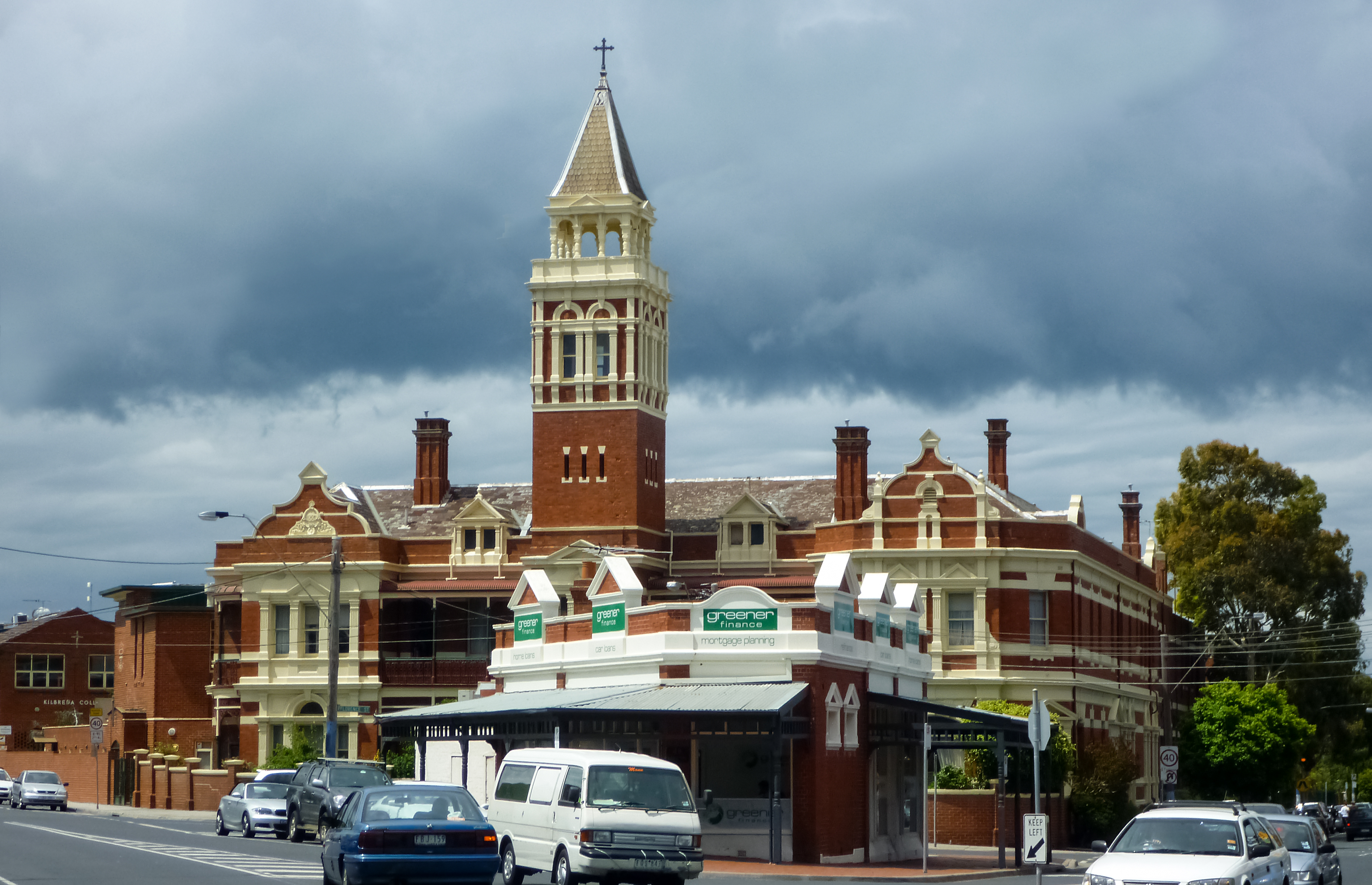
Panorama of Mentone

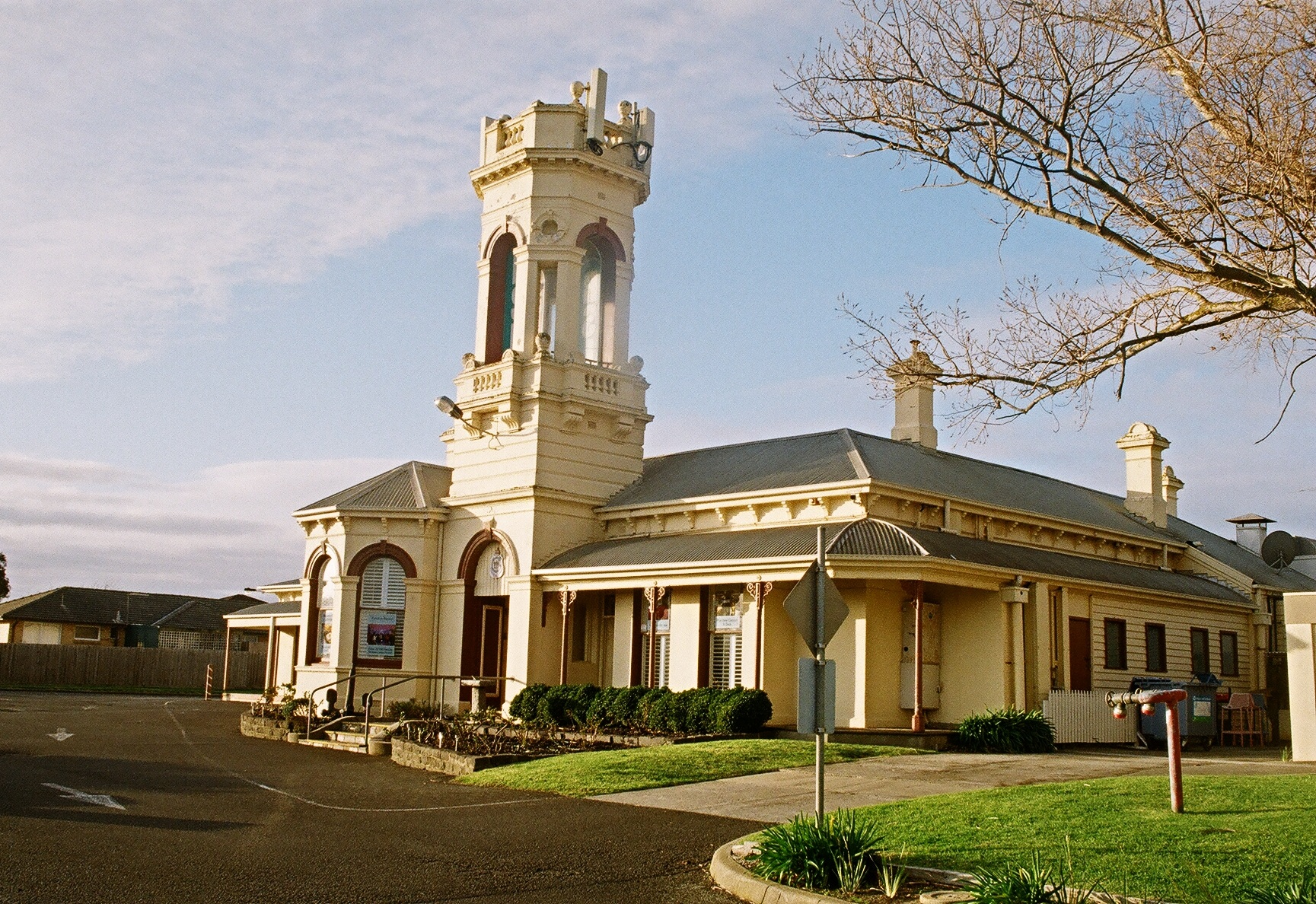
The Mentone branch of the RSL

Mentone was founded as a resort town named after the Italian spelling of the formerly-Italian French town Menton. In order to keep with the Italian resort theme many streets in Mentone were named after Italian cities for example, Cremona Street, Florence Street, Venice Street and Milan Street and Naples street

The development of Mentone began in the late 1800s, the Post Office opening on 16 May 1884.

Tom Roberts and Frederick McCubbin were painting on the beach at Mentone one day in the summer of 1886-87 when they noticed a young man painting nearby. This was Arthur Streeton who they asked to join them. They, and others, later became known as the Heidelberg school of artists.

The original Mentone fire station was located on the corner of Brindisi Street and Mentone Parade, Mentone in 1906 and after the new fire station was built it was relocated to Nepean Hwy, Mentone in 1957.

== Shopping ==
Mentone is home to a lively shopping area along Como Parade West, Balcombe Road, Mentone Parade and surrounding streets and laneways. This shopping strip offers a wide range of restaurants, cafes, bakeries, clothing stores, supermarkets, travel agents, fancy dress, craft, home, book stores and more. A second commercial area has grown along Nepean Highway; this may expand as the former Nylex factory site between Nepean Highway and Warrigal road is redeveloped into a bulky goods retail precinct.

Neighbouring suburb, Cheltenham, includes one of the biggest shopping centres in Australia – Westfield Southland. This shopping mall incorporates a two-level bridge that spans the six lanes of Nepean Highway. It is the main shopping centre for people of Mentone and surrounds. A new train station opened in 2017 on the west side of Southland near Bay Street.

In late 2010, Thrift Park shopping centre between Lower Dandenong Road and Nepean Highway just east of Warrigal Road went through with a $35-million redevelopment. The redevelopment included demolishing the original centre that was "ageing" and building a larger Woolworths supermarket plus additional stores. The centre officially opened in December 2010.

== Politics ==
In terms of state and federal government Mentone is situated in the Electoral district of Mordialloc and Sandringham for state parliament and the Electoral district of Isaacs in the federal system. In the 2018 Victorian state election and the 2019 Australian federal election, every booth in Mentone reported a majority of votes for the Labor Party.

2022 federal election, "Mentone" polling booth, Division of Isaacs, primary votes.
Liberal Robbie Beaton	28.43%
Labor - Mark Dreyfus	38.31%
Greens - Alex Breskin	19.91%
Others	10.87%
Informal	2.53%

== Transport ==
Mentone is located on the Nepean Highway. Mentone is serviced by a variety of Public Transport Victoria buses, which are the 903 bus from Mordialloc, 811 and 812 from Brighton and Dandenong, The 708 to Hampton and Carrum and the 825 and Metro Trains Melbourne services, focused on the Mentone railway station, a station on the Frankston train line. The station opened on 19 December 1881 as Balcombe Road.

A new railway station was built at Mentone in 2020 as part of the Victorian government's removal of the level crossing previously on Balcombe Road.

== Entertainment and leisure ==
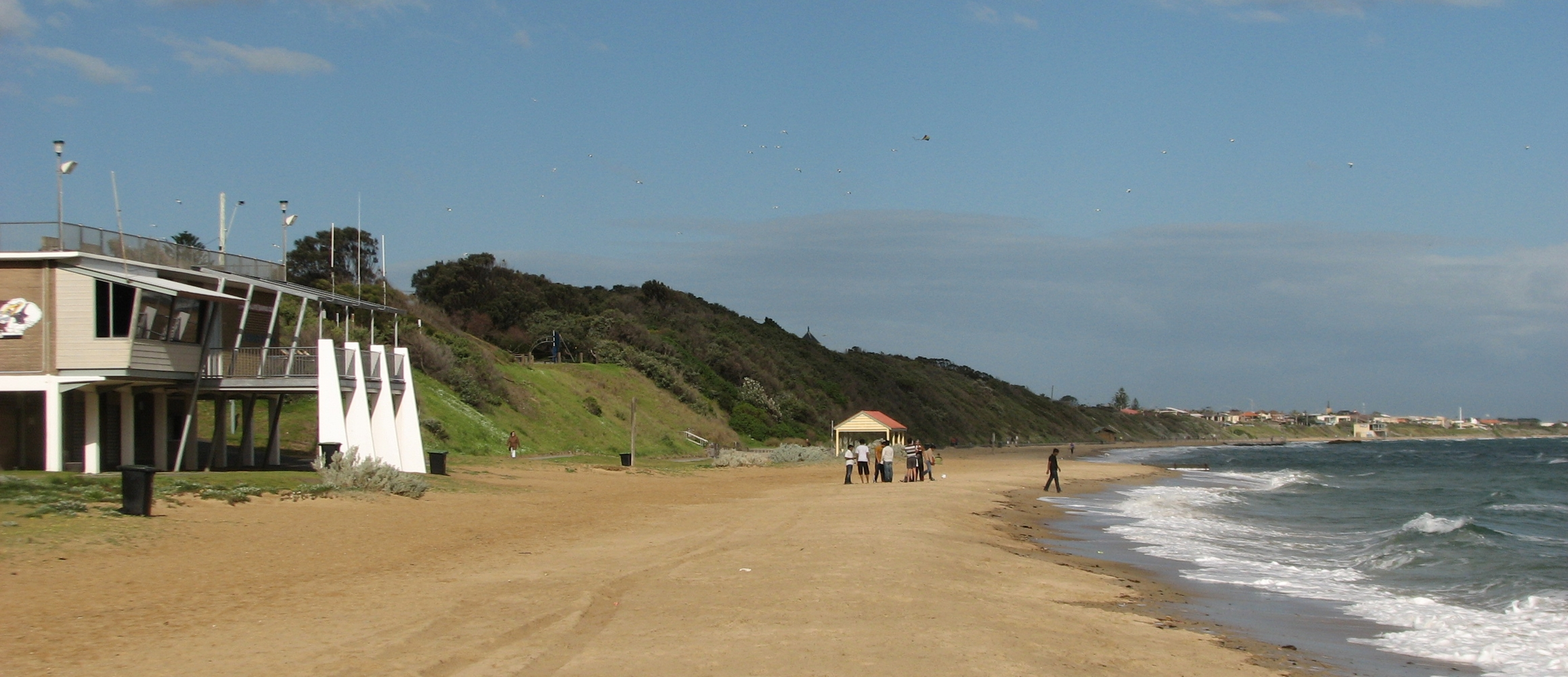
Old Mentone Lifesaving Club on Mentone Beach

The Mentone Beach and Mentone Lifesaving Club provide leisure space and activities, as do the parkland and oval near the council offices. Mentone is also home to numerous sporting clubs including cricket, football, tennis, swimming, field hockey, and lawn bowling.

Mentone Bowling Club was established in the early 1900s. The club is next to the train station in the centre of the suburb. Mentone were promoted to the Premier Division in 2010.

In late 2013 it was announced the iconic Mentone Tenpin Bowl on the corner of the Nepean Hwy and Warrigal Rd would close by the end of that year after fifty years of operation in order to make way for a new multi-storey residential apartment and retail complex.

The Mentone Hotel was a historical hotel building overlooking Port Phillip Bay. It has been renovated into a number of apartments. The Mentone RSL is housed in a building dating to 1884–1886.

One of Australia's last Blockbuster Video stores was in Mentone but has since closed down.

== Schools ==
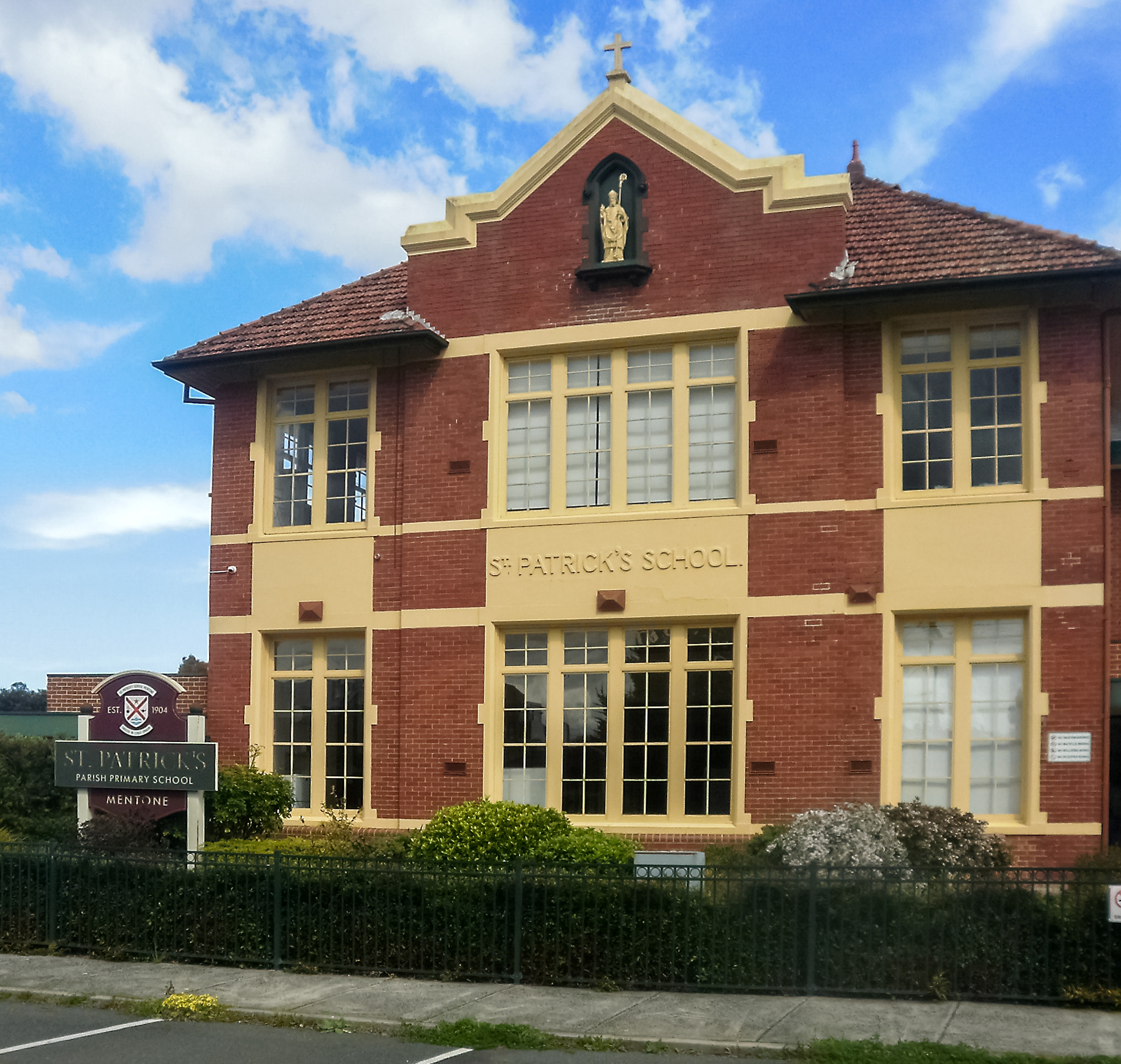
St Patricks Primary school next to Church of the same name

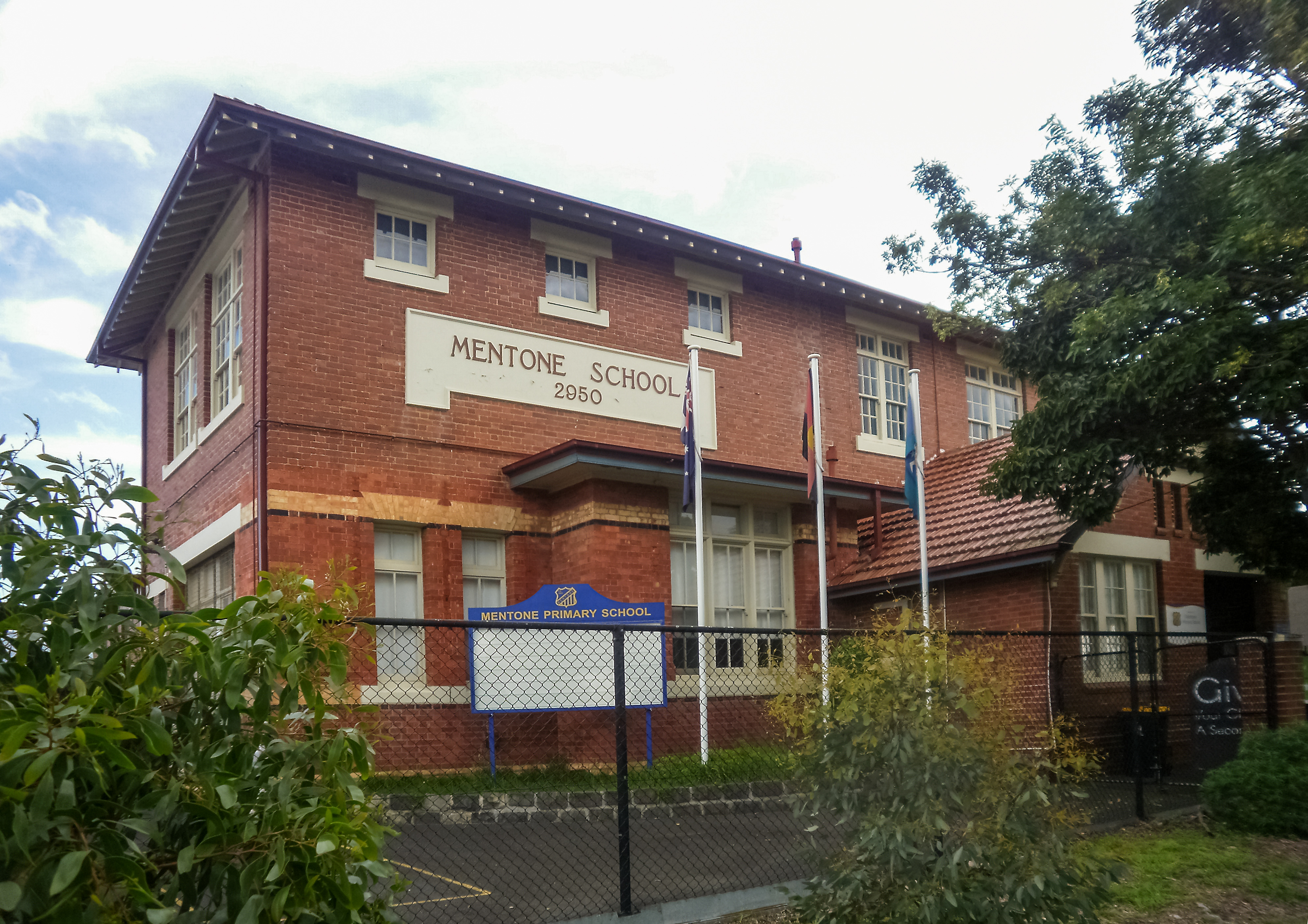
Mentone Primary school

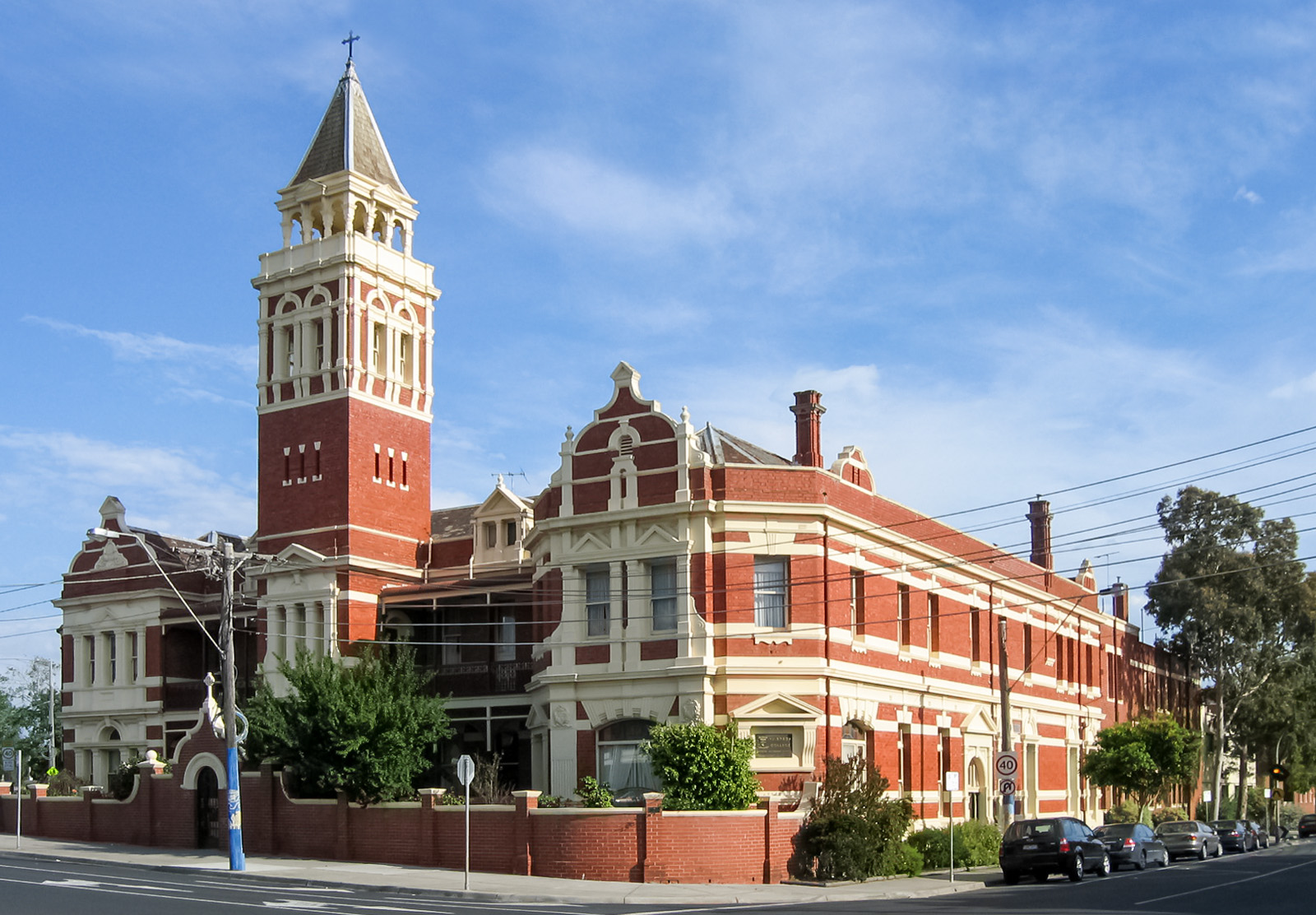
Kilbreda College
- Kilbreda College - A Catholic Secondary School for girls, founded in 1904. The school is owned and administered by the Brigidine Sisters.
- St Bede's College - A Catholic Secondary School for boys, founded in 1938. It is owned and administered by the De La Salle Brothers.
- Mentone Grammar School - An Anglican school founded in 1923. Co-ed since 2006, Kindergarten to Secondary Education. The school competes in the AGSV (associated Grammar Schools of Victoria).
- Mentone Girls' Grammar School - An Anglican school for girls from ELC to year 12, founded in 1899.
- Mentone Girls' Secondary College
- St Patrick's Catholic Primary School
- Mentone Primary School
- Mentone Park Primary School - a school situated in Mentone East, Mentone Park PS is a smaller school with around 200 students (as of 2021). It prides itself on having small classes and offers specialist Auslan, visual arts, PE and performing arts programs. It received state government funded for a substantial upgrade in the 2019/20 Victorian budget.

== Notable people ==
- Tony Cohen - music record producer and sound engineer
- Bill Granger - cook and food writer
- Rex Hunt - television and radio personality
- James Lyall - Presbyterian minister
- Ian Meckiff – Test cricketer, best known for "chucking" incident
- Fred Morgan - recorder maker
- John Morrison - author, lived in Mentone in the 1950s, working as a jobbing gardener, before he became a professional writer
- Leo O'Brien - cricketer
- Eddie Perfect – actor, singer, comedian and composer
- Kenneth Shave - soldier, businessman, benefactor
- Dav Whatmore - cricket coach and former player
- Geoff Wilson - nuclear physicist and academic

== See also ==
- City of Moorabbin – Parts of Mentone were previously within this former local government area.
- City of Mordialloc – Parts of Mentone were previously within this former local government area.
