= Mentone Beach =

Beach in Victoria, Australia

- Beach
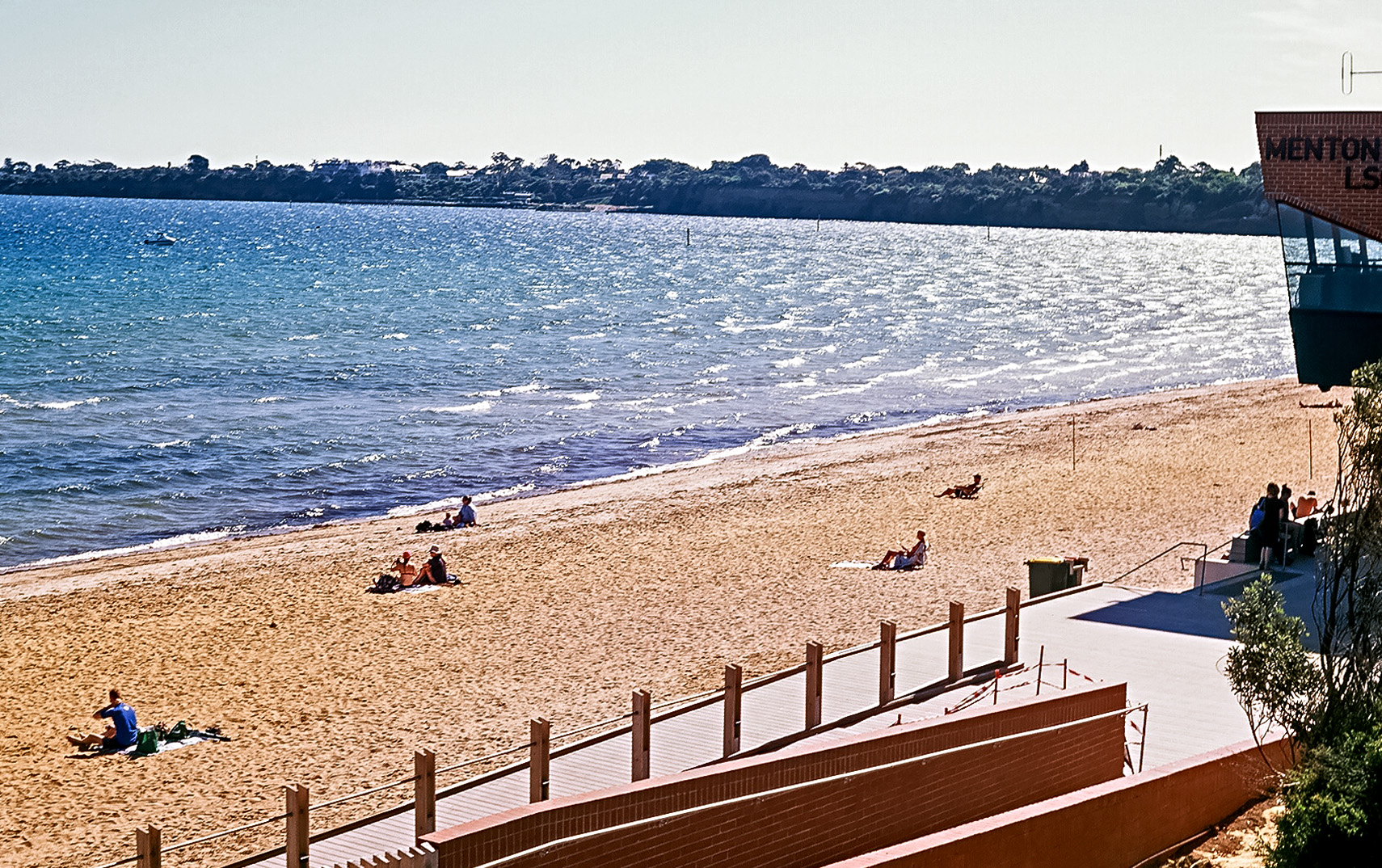
- Mentone Beach outside Life saving club
- Interactive map of Mentone Beach
- Coordinates: 37°59′06″S 145°04′08″E
- Location: Mentone, Victoria

Dimensions
  - Length: 1.6 km
- Patrolled by: Mentone Lifesaving Club
- Hazard rating: 3/10 (Moderately hazardous)
- Access: Beach Road, Mentone

Mentone Beach is a beach located in Mentone, on Port Phillip Bay, Victoria, Australia, 21 kilometres south from the Melbourne City Centre. Mentone beach is the northern section of a beach that extends alongside Beaumaris Bay from the cliffs at Rickett's Point in Beaumaris to Frankston in the south on the eastern shoreline of Port Phillip Bay.

Mentone Beach is one of the Port Phillip Bay beaches associated with the Heidelberg School of Australian artists.

== Geology ==
Mentone Beach was formed when Port Phillip sunklands in southern Victoria were inundated to form Port Phillip Bay. The inundation was triggered in part by the Selwyn Fault on the east and the Rowsley Fault on the west side of the bay. The Beaumaris Monocline is a geological feature which is expressed in the cliffs near Beaumaris and Rickett's Point at the northern end of Mentone Beach. This structure controls the coastal indentation, and therefore the Mentone and Mordialloc beaches, which lie due south of Rickett's Point.

Seagull rock is a large rock in the shallow water off the beach. It is home to albatrosses, cormorants and seagulls.

OzCoast, the Geoscience Australia Online Coastal Information Database, describes Mentone Beach as:

Beach characteristics
Length (km)	1.6
Orientation (degree)	210
Embaymentisation	1.0
Number of bars	3
Wave height (m)	0.4
Wave period (sec)	5.0
Tide station	Melbourne
Spring tide (m)	0.8
Neap tide (m)	0.2

== Aboriginal history ==
Prior to European settlement the area around Mentone Beach was the land of the Bunurong people of the Kulin nation. Between 1839 and 1849 the Bunurong people and the area around Mentone Beach came under the control of the Port Phillip Protectorate.

== European history ==
In the summer of 1886 and 1887 Tom Roberts and Frederick McCubbin who had formed the Heidelberg School of painting set up a painters camp at Mentone to paint outdoors. It was here they first met Arthur Streeton painting at Rickett's Point. Roberts later described the meeting and his first impressions of Streeton, "'He was standing out on the wet rocks, painting there, and I saw that his work was full of light and air. We asked him to join us and that was the beginning of a long and delightful association." A number of significant and important Australian painting resulted from the Heidelberg School camps in and around Mentone Beach.

Heidelberg School paintings of Mentone Beach

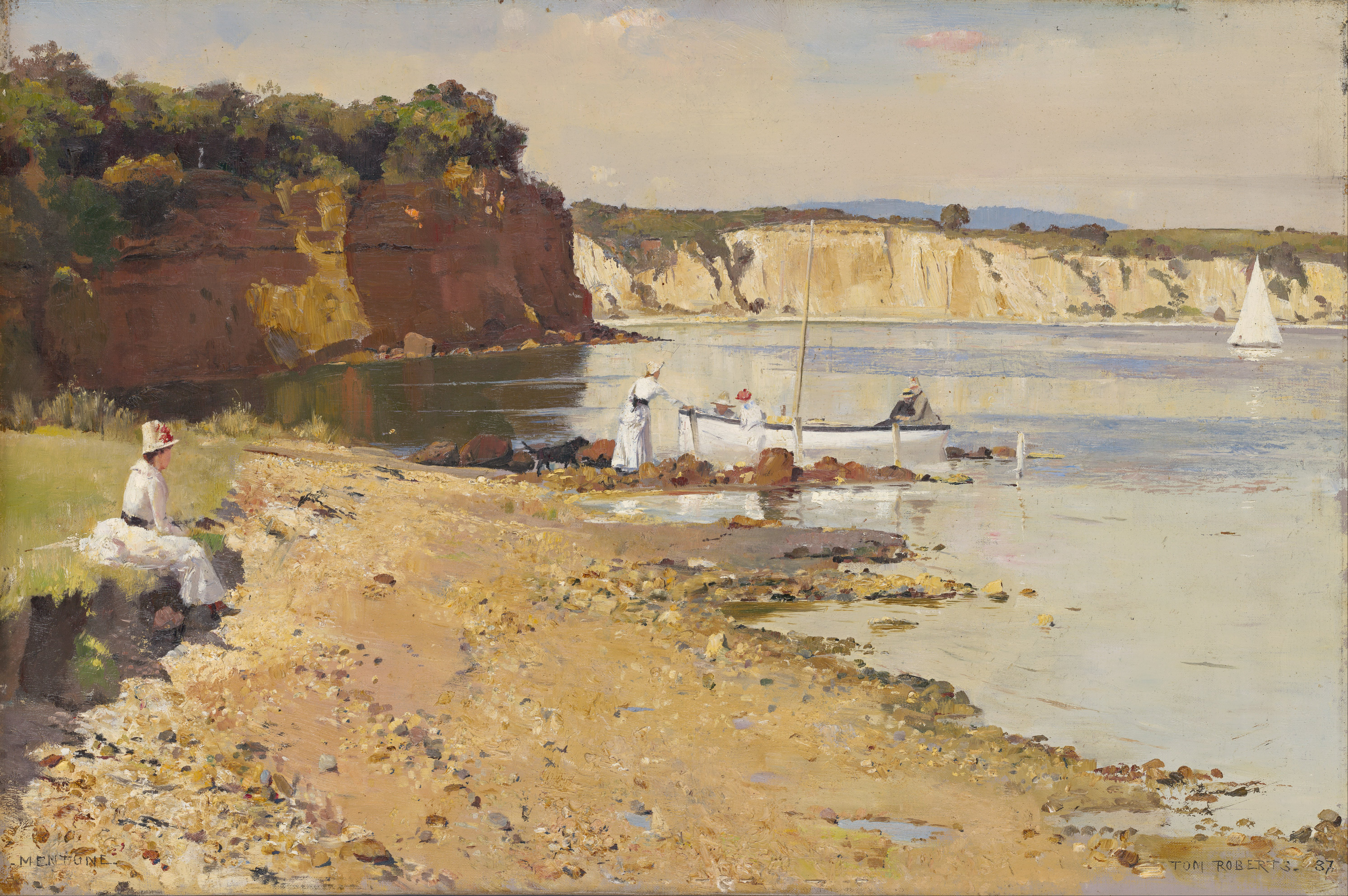
Slumbering Sea, Mentone 1887, oil on canvas by Tom Roberts

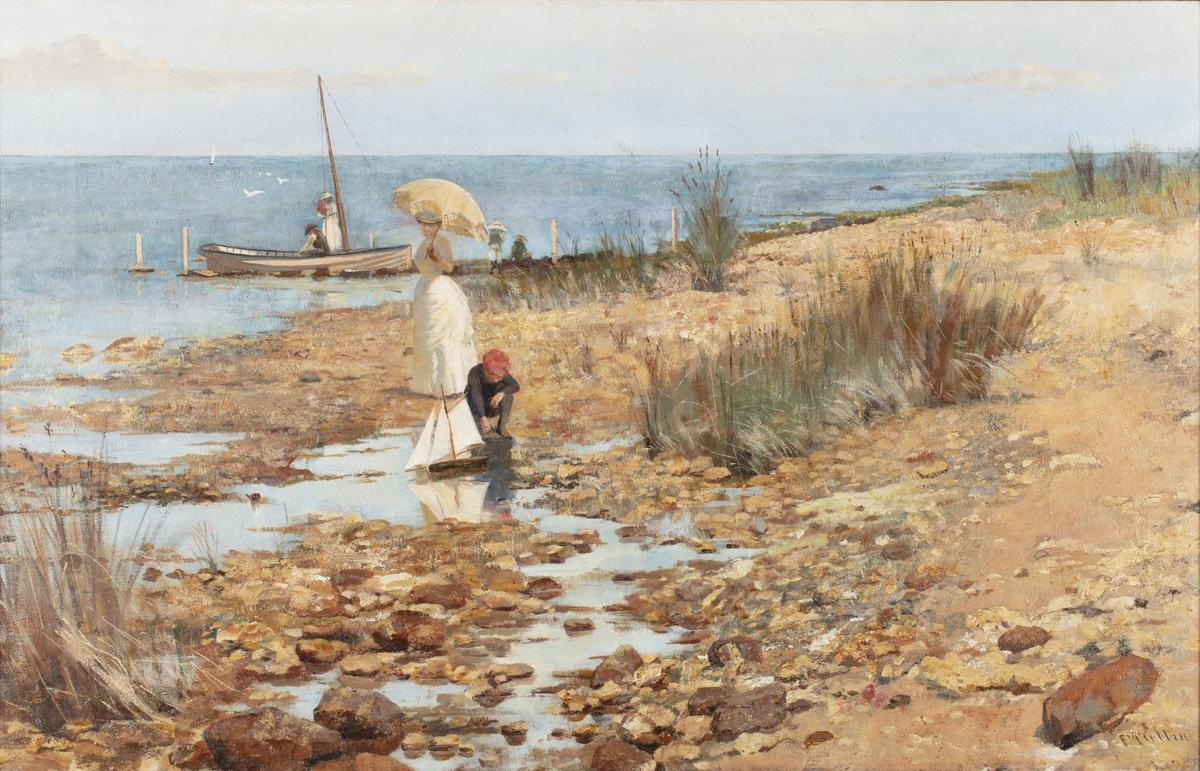
Moyes Bay, Beaumaris, 1887, oil on canvas by Frederick McCubbin

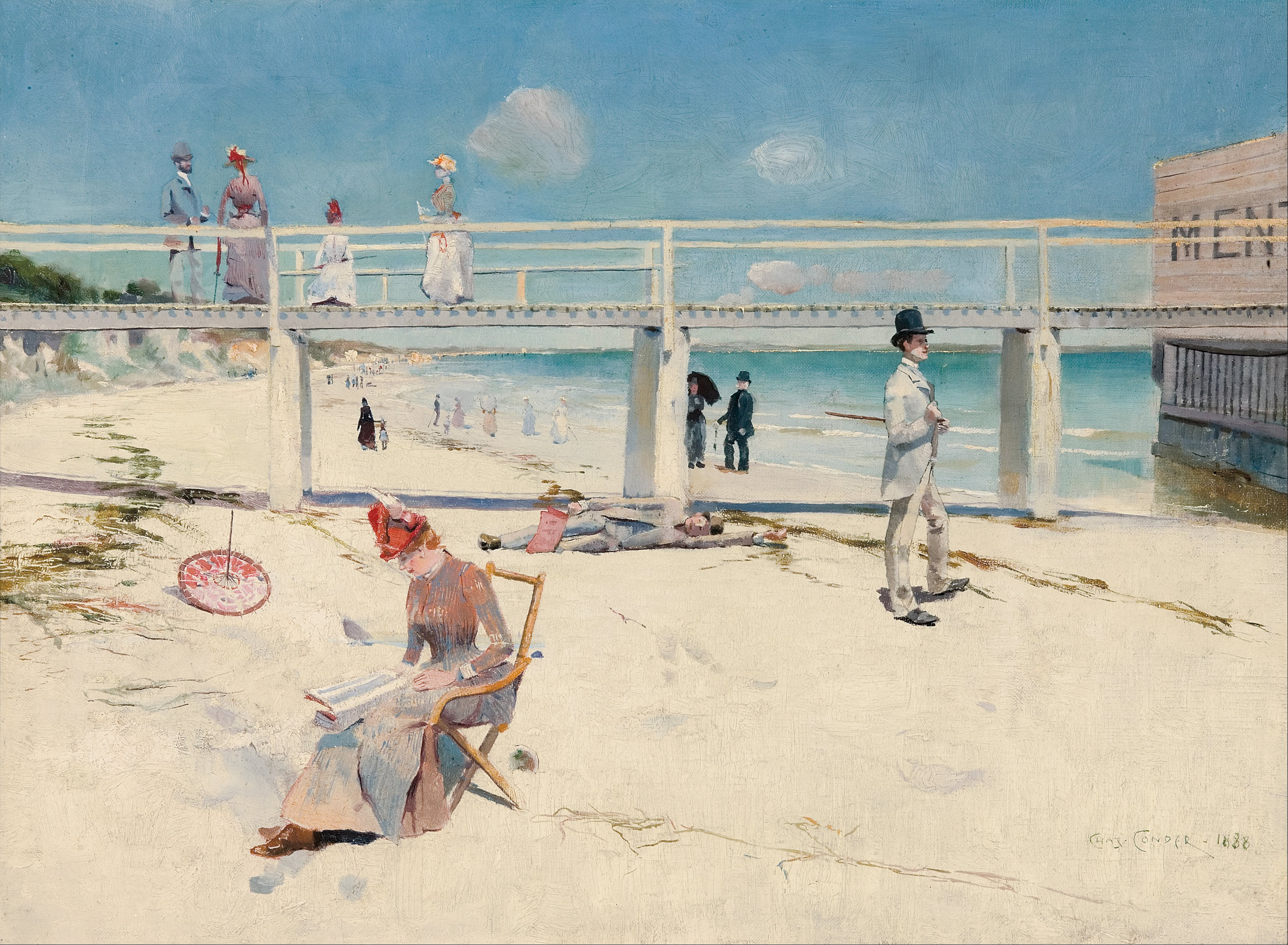
A holiday at Mentone, 1888, oil on canvas by Charles Conder

In the late 1800s Mentone was founded as a resort town with the beach as one of the main attractions. The Mentone railway station, opened in 1881, provided access from the city of Melbourne. In 1884 an enclosed sea baths were built at Mentone Beach by the National Land Company to attract holiday makers and to boost real estate sales. Men and women used the sea baths at different times with coloured flags, white for women and red for men, indicating which gender was allowed to use the facilities. Between 1891 and 1964 there was also a pier located at the bottom of Naples Road that stretched over 100 metres out to sea.

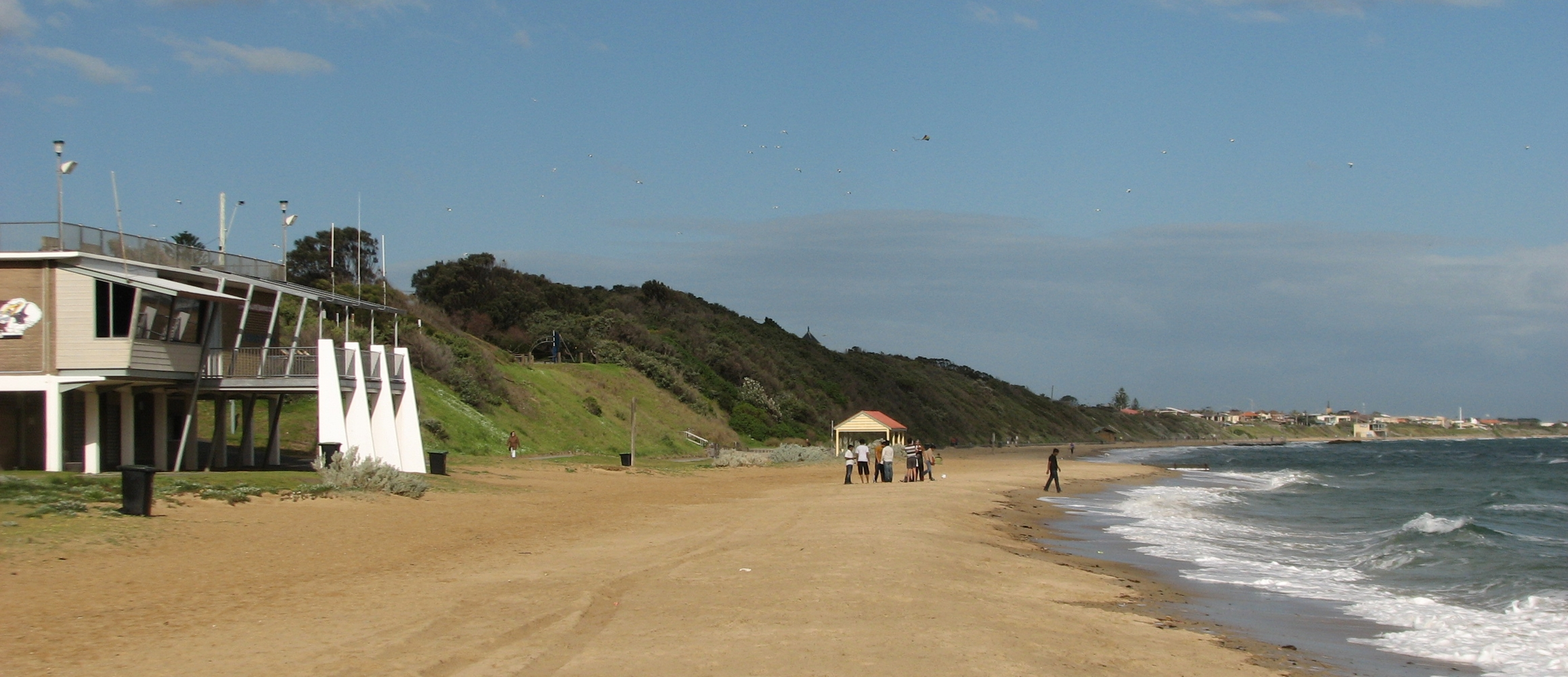
Old Mentone Lifesaving Club rooms

The Mentone Lifesaving Club was formed in 1920 when the newly created City of Mordialloc (now the City of Kingston) donated two bathing boxes to the newly formed Mentone Swimming and Life Saving Club on the site to the south of the former Mentone Pier.
