= A holiday at Mentone =

1888 painting by Charles Conder

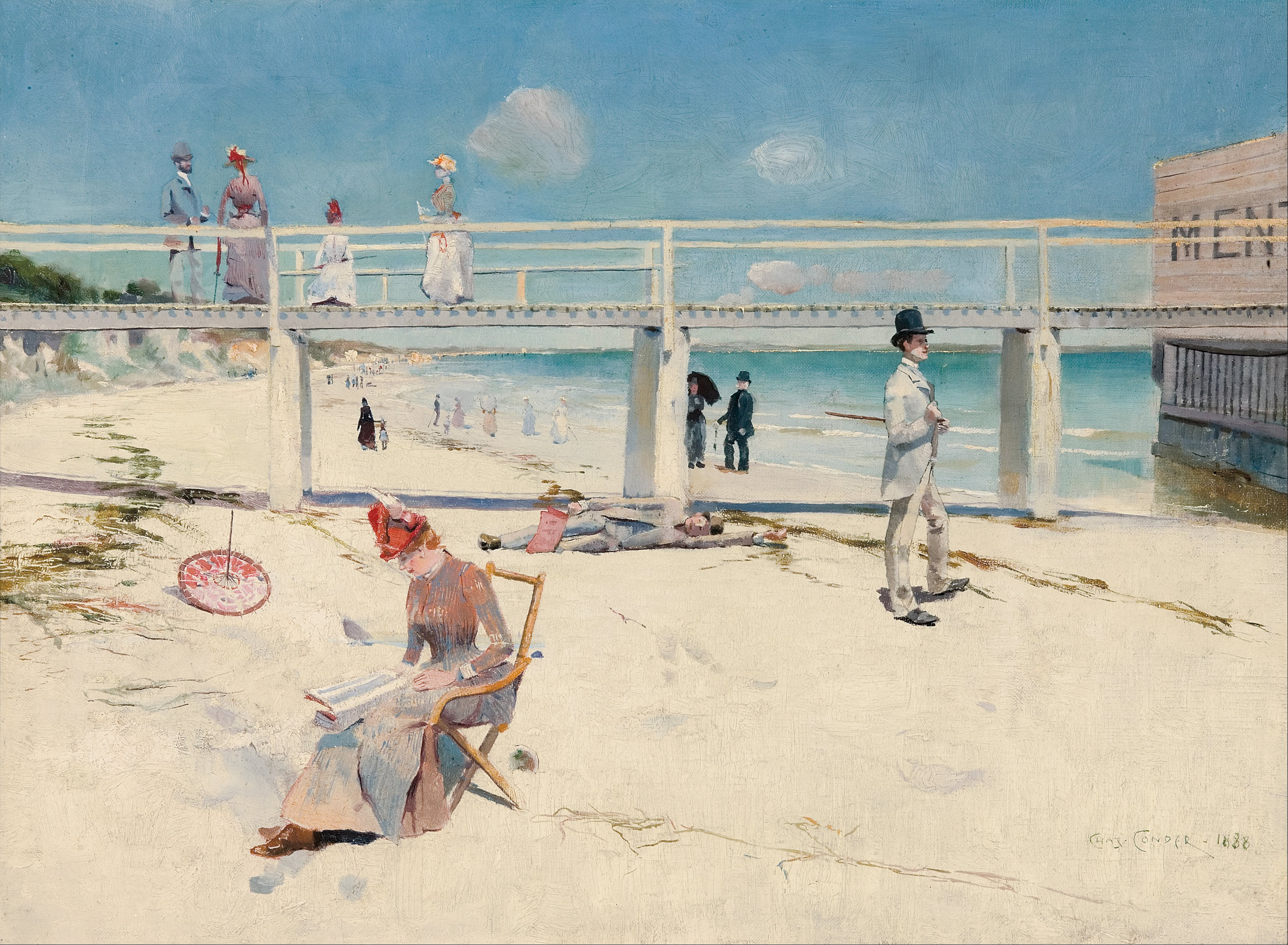
- Artist: Charles Conder
- Year: 1888
- Medium: oil on canvas
- Dimensions: 46.2 cm × 60.8 cm (18.2 in × 23.9 in)
- Location: Art Gallery of South Australia, Adelaide

A holiday at Mentone is an 1888 painting by Charles Conder, a leading member of the Heidelberg School movement, also known as Australian impressionism. It depicts people engaged in seaside activities on a sunny day at Mentone Beach, in the Melbourne suburb of Mentone.

The painting is celebrated for capturing the heat and brilliant noonday sunshine that is characteristic of Australia. Noted also for its jokes and visual puns, A holiday at Mentone has been described as "a witty comment on the transformation of nature into artifice through fashion, decorum, and painting".

== Background ==
In October 1888, Conder, aged 20, moved to Melbourne from Sydney. Conder had met the Melbourne-based painter Tom Roberts in Sydney the previous year and again at Easter 1888, where the pair had painted en plein air together at Coogee Beach. In Melbourne, Conder initially based himself at Roberts' Grosvenor Chambers studio and A Holiday at Mentone was his first painting in the new city, completed within a few weeks of arriving there.

During the summer of 1886–87 at Mentone, Roberts and Frederick McCubbin established an "artists' camp" and, as legend has it, encountered for the first time the young Arthur Streeton, painting en plein air on the beach. These three artists, along with Conder, formed the core membership of what became known as the Heidelberg School movement, also known as Australian impressionism.

== Composition ==
At least some of the work was painted en plein air, as evidenced by beach sand embedded within the paint, discovered later by conservators. Its composition and bridge show the influence of Japanese art; a similar bridge motif was commonly used by the American painter James McNeill Whistler, a major influence on Conder and other members of the Heidelberg School. Roberts' 1885 painting Winter morning after rain, Gardiner's Creek, with its high horizon line and bisecting bridge, may have also been a reference point. The strands of seaweed on the shore cleverly indicate spatial depth and are treated "almost caligraphically", drawing further comparisons to Japanese decorative elements.

The painting is a social comedy containing several visual puns. While at first it seems a depiction of decorous behaviour, the three figures in the foreground are rigid and disunited in their arrangement. The fashionably dressed woman is seated with her back to the scene, including Mentone Baths, a gender-segregated bathhouse. She has ignored her wind-blown Japanese umbrella, now upturned on the sand and appearing like an imitation of a red ukiyo-e seal. Instead, she reads a copy of the pink-covered periodical The Bulletin, known for its larrikin humour and radical, literary nationalism. Standing on the right, the flaneur (leisurely observer of urban life) gazes out at "nowhere in particular". It has also been suggested that he and the "New Woman" are actually watching each other from the corner of their eye, feigning disinterest. The third figure, a man, situated between the other two, lies prostrate on the beach with his arm raised in an awkward pose. Facing the viewer and with a copy of The Bulletin between his legs, he looks comical, if not surreal, and his behaviour "underlines the sense of self-conscious display in the painting". In the background, an elderly couple dressed conservatively in black observe the three young beachgoers—progressive members of Melbourne's rising middle class.

One of Streeton's descendants suggested that Roberts is the figure in the grey suit on the pier and Streeton is the man lying down on the beach.

== Reception and legacy ==
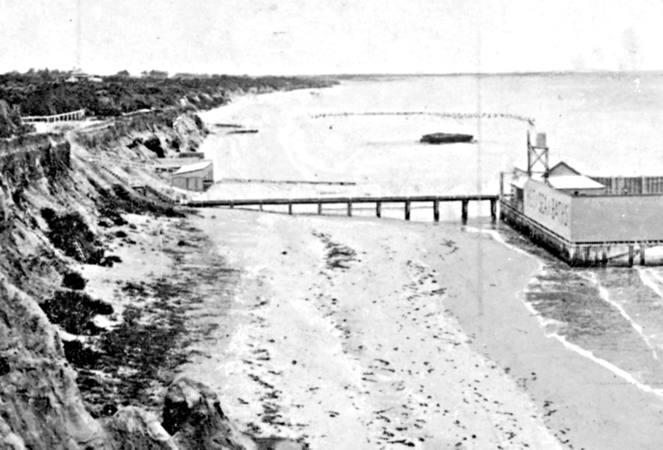
A 1907 photograph showing the portion of Mentone Beach depicted in the painting.

The painting was first exhibited at the Victorian Artists' Society's Spring exhibition in November 1888, one month after Conder arrived in Melbourne. Reviewing the show, The Argus noted: "Charles Conder is another young artist who has fallen under the spell of the French impressionists."

Perhaps Conder's best known painting, A holiday at Mentone has been described as a "critically acclaimed masterpiece of the Australian Impressionist style of painting" and a "singularly Australian work". Terence Lane, senior curator of Australian Art at the National Gallery of Victoria described the painting's staging as "stilted, almost surreal" but the composition as "splendidly abstract and the sunshine brilliantly Australian".

The painting was formerly owned by John Atwill, president of the Liberal Party of Australia. The Art Gallery of South Australia purchased the painting off Atwill for A$250,000 in 1981.

In 1984, Australia Post issued a stamp featuring A holiday at Mentone.
