= Grosvenor Chambers =

Former purpose-built artists' studios in Melbourne, Australia

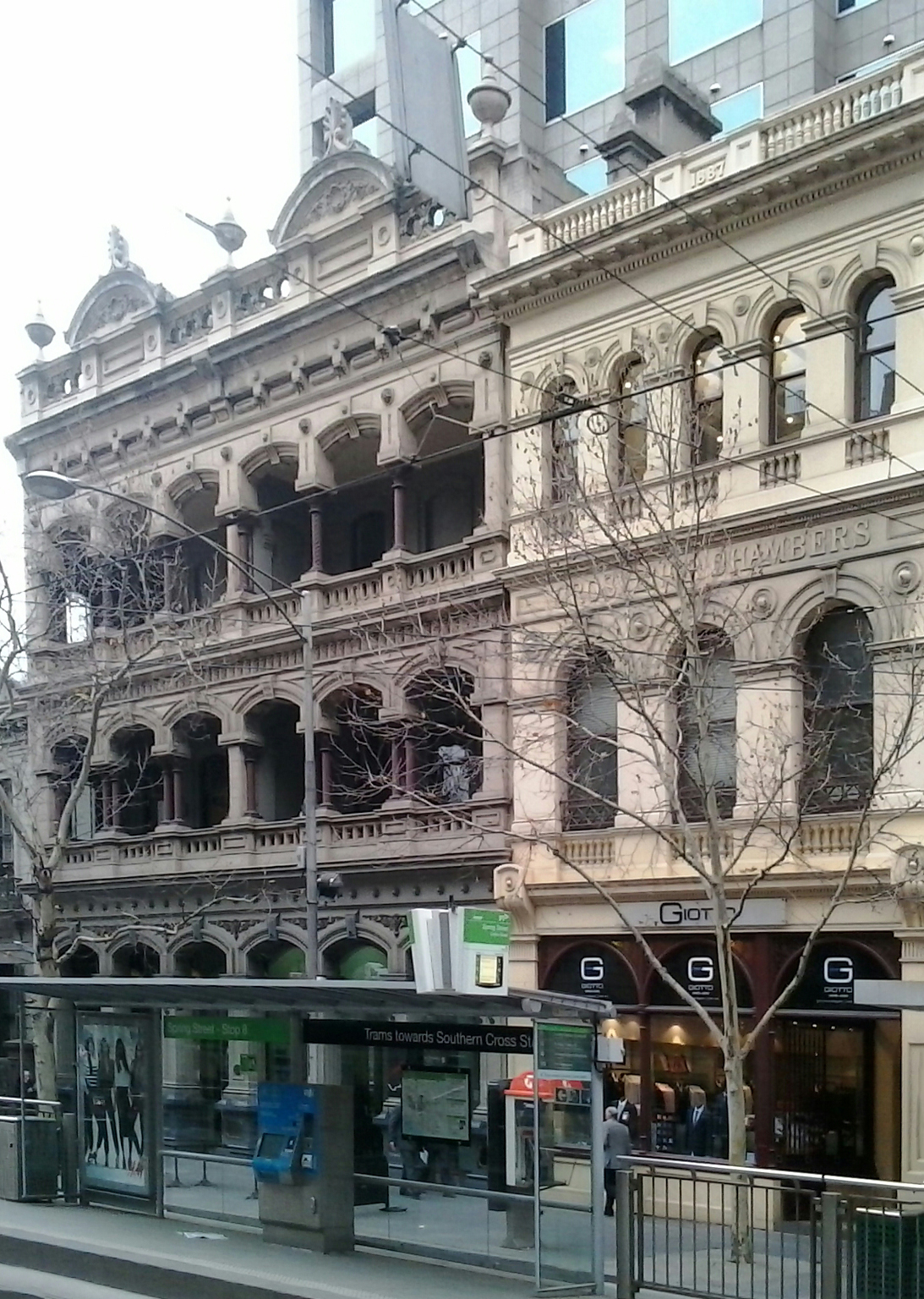
- Grosvenor Chambers on the right, with tower of One Collins Street rising behind

- Location within Melbourne Grosvenor Chambers (Australia)

General information
- Status: Completed
- Location: 9 Collins Street, Melbourne
- Coordinates: 37°48′49″S 144°58′25″E

Grosvenor Chambers, at number 9 Collins Street, Melbourne, contained the first custom-built complex of artists' studios in Australia.

== Initiation ==
The owner was Edinburgh-born Charles Stewart Paterson (1843-1917) who with W. Davidson, and also in 1888, purchased for speculation the 'Bondi Aquarium and Pleasure Grounds' in Sydney. He, in partnership with his brothers Hugh and James, had a high-end decorating business in Melbourne designing and creating interiors for Kamesburgh in Brighton, Government House, the Melbourne Town Hall, Villa Alba in Kew and the Parliamentary Library. After his retirement from the firm c. 1887 he built Grosvenor Chambers. As one of the original members of the Working Men's College on its foundation in 1882 his interest in visual design inspired his fitting out the building as artist studios. Another brother was the painter John Ford Paterson who sometimes exhibited with the Heidelberg School artists.

== Construction ==
Architects Oakden, Addison and Kemp designed the three-storey building in a neoclassical style, making a feature of three large arched windows at the first floor level below a row of five windows to artist studios of much smaller proportions in the top floor. Each window features recessed balustrades beneath impost mouldings and prominent keystones and Stawell freestone pilasters on the upper storey. The cement-rendered facade is broken by horizontal string courses below the overhanging cornice topped by a balustraded parapet. Large windows beside the entrance at right at ground level were originally arched and offer commercial display. They have been substantially remodelled with changes of tenancy and purpose.

The building contractor W. Davidson who was then mayor of Richmond completed construction for a cost of almost £6,000. The building, bearing on its parapet the date 1887, officially opened on 21 April 1888 with a 'smoke concert' attended by the Melbourne art world.

== Description ==
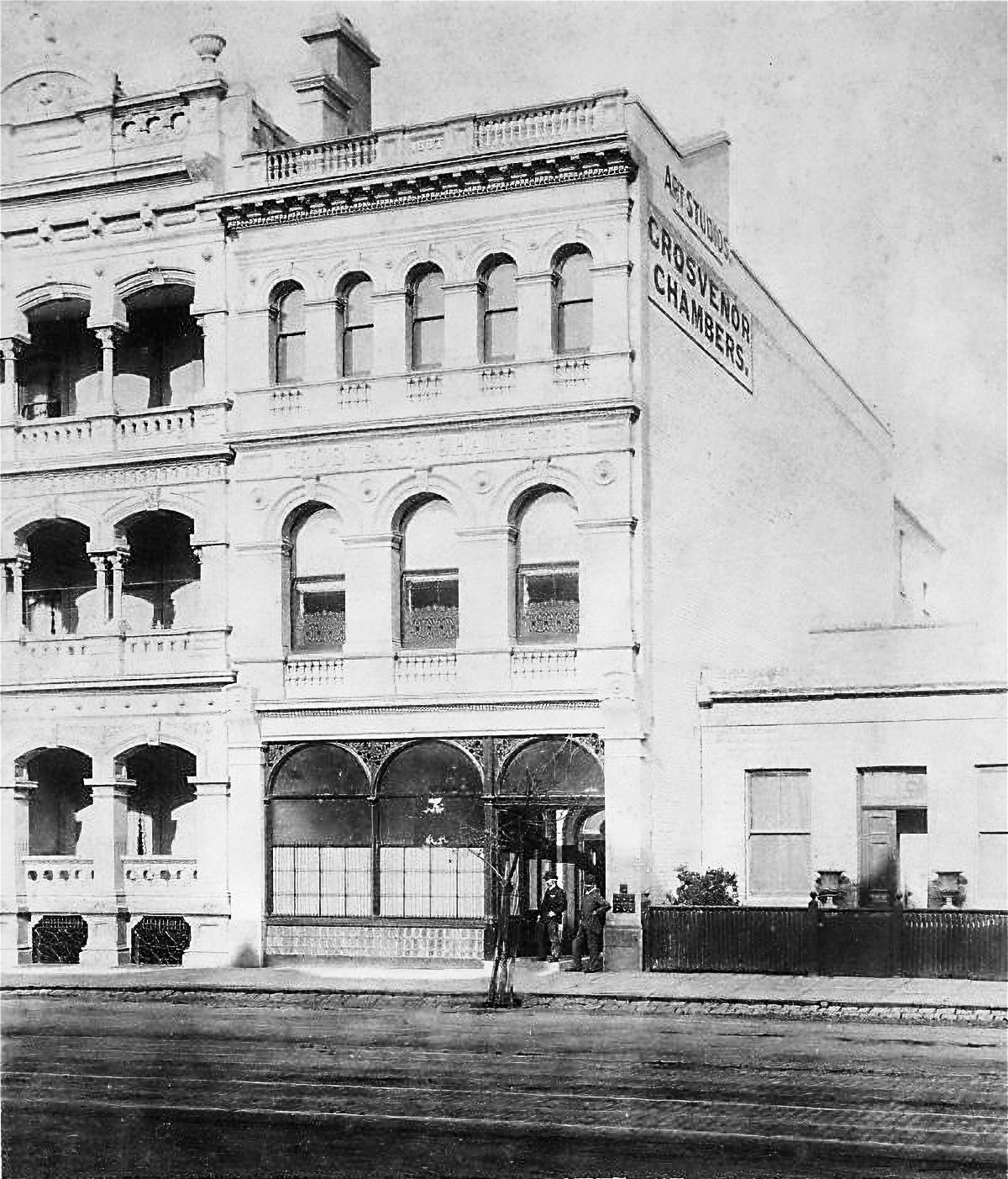
CB Walker Studio, Grosvenor Chambers, Melbourne, 1888-1899. Saw-tooth skylights visible at roof level. Albumen print 23.9 x 19.7 cm. Art Gallery of New South Wales

The upper floor consisted of five well-lit artists' studios with ante-rooms all provided with light from skylights with a southern elevation (to provide the Southern Hemisphere equivalent of a 'north light') and tall windows on to Collins Street; natural lighting designed "on principles laid down by Sir Joshua Reynolds" and by consultation with the first artists to occupy them; Tom Roberts, James C. Waite, Louis Abrahams, and George Walton.

The middle floor had space for a society costumier, initially Mrs Eeles, a fabric showroom and workshop, occupied from c.1910 by "Madame Masseran, Corsets Et Jupons"

The ground floor housed the showroom for the Patersons' decorative arts business and doctors consulting rooms at the rear.

The rear basement atelier was occupied initially by sculptor Percival Ball, constructed so that the downhill slope toward Flinders Lane placed his floor above the level of the adjoining Howitt Lane and created a clearance in the room of 7 metres, thus accommodating large works-in-progress. A wide doorway and window had a fanlight over them that was removable to provide an entrance to the Lane over 2m wide, and to the height of the room, for passage of large pieces of sculpture, such as the first he produced there, his "7 foot 2 inch" Sir William Wallace commissioned for 1,000 guineas for the Ballarat Gardens. The front of the basement, a spacious cellar, was lighted with Hayward's patent prismatic pavement lights.

Stained-glass windows over the staircase showing figures symbolising Sculpture, Painting, and Heraldic Work were by Brooks, Robinson, and Co. whose work is also found in the Princess Theatre and who from this date employed most of Melbourne's stained-glass artists including William Frater.

== Contemporary response ==
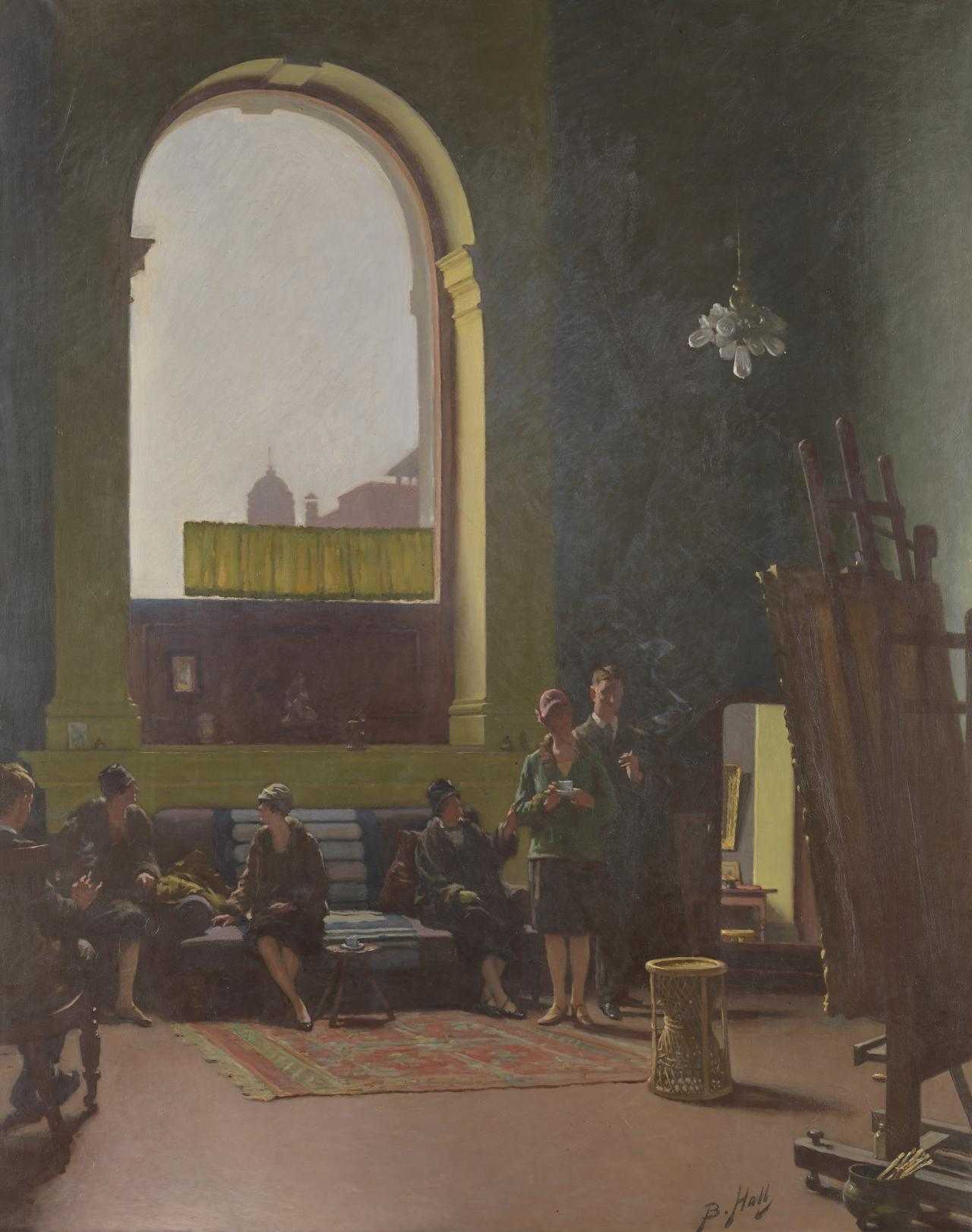
Bernard Hall (c.1926) The studio party, oil on canvas, 147.5 × 117.0 cm. National Gallery of Victoria, showing the interior of a Grosvenor Chambers studio

Contemporary reaction to the building and its purpose was recorded in reports of its opening, such as that in the Australian Sketcher;

The Australian artist has only recently begun to assert himself, to come out of holes and corners and back places of the city, to take his high and proper place amongst the professions, and to beard the Philistine with a bold front [...] A little while ago it was a very difficult matter tor an artist to find a house. Pile on pile of brick and mortar was heaped up for the accommodation of any limb of the law who had been duly licensed by the courts to fleece mankind. The doctors took and held their own end of Collins street, and the artist had to be content with any hole or any corner where he could set up his easel and fix his modest plate to a back door. The beginning of the end of his troubles in that way has approached by the opening of Grosvenor-chambers, wherein he really is to be first considered. Grosvenor-chambers were opened on the 20th April. The enterprising proprietor, Mr. C. S. Patterson [sic], wished to make some little announcement of what he had done, and with the artists who have become tenants of his studios, issued invitations for, a 'smoke night'. It began about 8 o'clock. A hundred people had gathered by that time, and were ranging over the building, somewhat amazed, a few of them, to find an artist nearly as comfortably disposed as a bank manager, with all his wants anticipated and supplied. An ante-room nicely furnished for arriving visitors; a studio within, almost as rich in decoration and upholstery as a dentist's or photographer's room. The high south windows, which all day long flood the easel and the sitter's throne with light, darkened now, and only the gaslight showing the pictures on the walls.

== Artist occupants ==
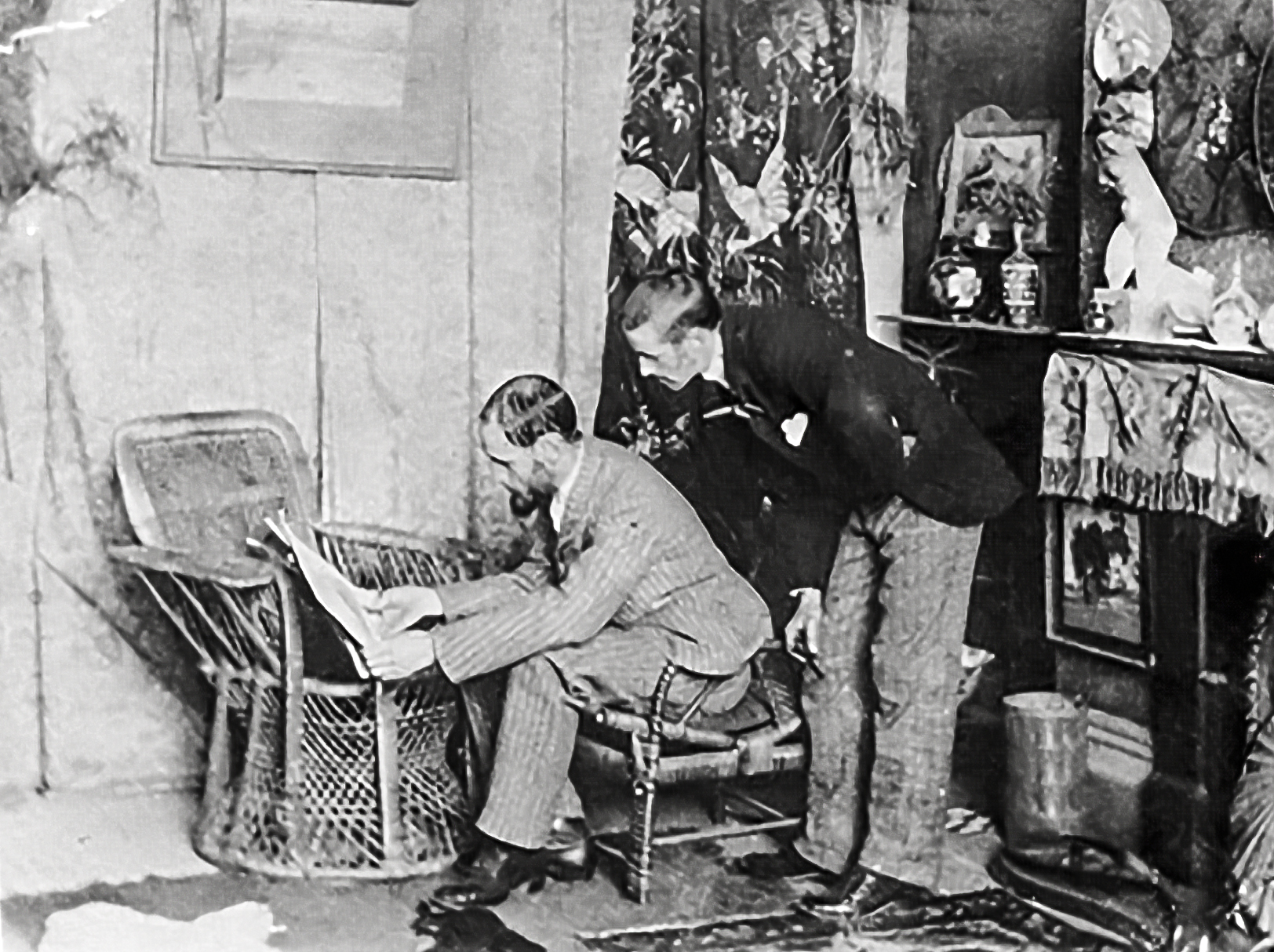
Unknown photographer (c.1890) Tom Roberts (seated) in his studio at Grosvenor Chambers with Arthur Streeton

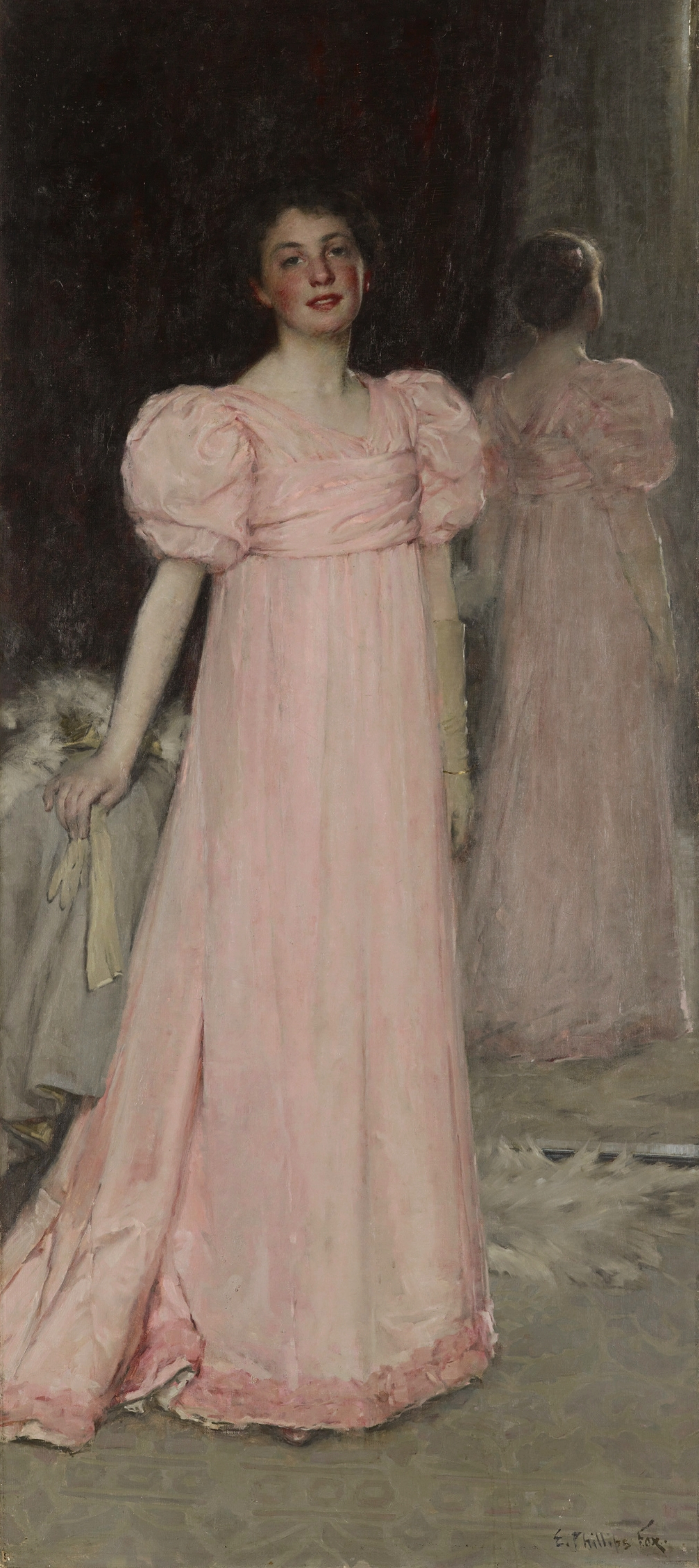
Emmanuel Phillips Fox (1893-1894) Portrait of my cousin, oil on canvas, painted at Grosvenor Chambers

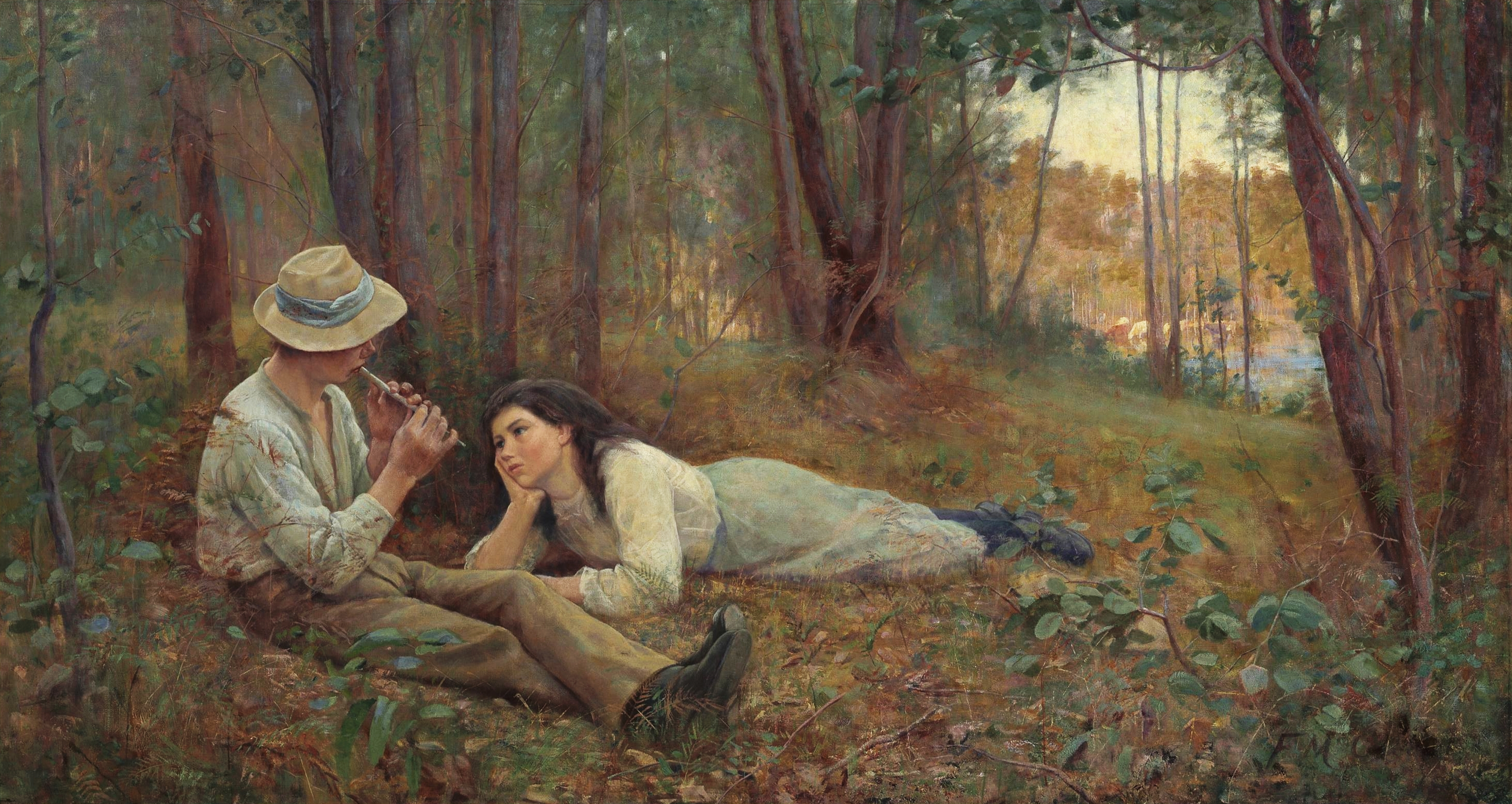
Frederick McCubbin (1893) Bush idyll / The Flute Player, oil on canvas119.5 x 221.5 cm. Private collection. Exhibited in a private viewing at Grosvenor Chambers May 1894

Grosvenor Chambers saw Roberts in his role in developing an Australian school of art when he lived in Grosvenor Chambers while camping over weekends at Heidelberg, and when painting his "9 by 5 Impressions," and in the studio he painted portraits of Melbourne's leading intellectuals and works presenting its cultural and social life. Two of his major paintings of Australian life, Shearing the Rams and The Breakaway were painted there. On his 'Studio Wednesdays' he and other Heidelberg School artists opened their studios regularly, to show work-in-progress to the public, accounts of which appeared in April 1888;

The number of people in Melbourne interested in art is large, if one may judge by the throng that climbed the four flights of stairs in the Grosvenor-chambers in Collins-street to reach Mr. Roberts's large and well-lighted studio. The ante-room leading to the studio was gay with winter flowers and aesthetic screens and hangings. Here afternoon tea was served to the visitors. In the studio were three examples of Mr. Roberts's art— a forest scene, in which a workman is employed in clearing away gum-tree stumps; a 'bit' of Sydney harbour, which, though well painted, gives one very little idea of the beauty of the place; and a study of a girl's head. A large well-painted bush scene, representing a bushman kindling a fire to boil the inevitable 'billy,' near his tent, while behind the man, the fire, and the tent rise the great blue-gum-trees in gloomy grandeur, that was a striking picture in the exhibition, was the work of Mr. Streeton, another Australian artist. Mr. F. McCubbin, a promising young landscape painter showed two canvases at this exhibition. Both represented 'bits' in the Australian bush, and in both the 'open-air feeling' was very well pourtrayed [sic]. Mr. McCubbin is also happy in his skies. He seems to have caught the idea of a typical Australian sky – the representation of lightness and transparency. Walton, an English artist, who has exhibited at the Royal Academy, showed two charming portraits at this exhibition.

Their example prompted the artists C. Douglas Richardson, Charles Conder and Arthur Streeton to open their own studios in Gordon Chambers, Flinders Lane, though Conder and Streeton left the country soon after, along with George Walton at Grosvenor Chambers. Roberts also conducted a series of conversaziones like those in which he joined at the Buonarotti Club until 1887, inviting other artists to bring their newest French and other art journals for coffee, song and discussion "in true Bohemian style." One such event in 1889 attracted two hundred guests including His Excellency the Acting-Governor William C. F. Robinson and Lady Robinson, "who expressed themselves as very pleased with the conversazione."

Roberts too left the city, vacating his studio and selling off works including The Scrubcutter, in February 1892, with his place taken by Arthur Streeton. Like other artist tenants, E. P. Fox continued to institute an open studio day after Roberts' departure, with a showing of his portrait of Mrs James Pirani (National Gallery of Australia) in October 1893, and Portrait of my cousin (National Gallery of Victoria) in 1894.

From the 1880s many other notable artists rented a studio in the building, even after its auction and sale in 1939 to investment company A. Gordon Allard and Co. They included;

- Louis Abrahams
- Percival Ball
- Ola Cohn
- Tennyson Cole
- Charles Conder
- E. Phillips Fox
- George Lambert
- John Longstaff
- John Mather
- Frederick McCubbin
- Louis McCubbin shared a large studio with Will Rowell
- Max Meldrum
- Mirka Mora
- Girolamo Nerli,
- John Ford Paterson
- Jane Price
- Clara Southern
- Arthur Streeton(from May 1891 during Tom Roberts' absence overseas)
- Charles Francis Summers
- Jane Sutherland
- Albert Tucker.
- Tudor St George Tucker
- James Clarke Waite
- Rose Walker
- George Walton(briefly c.1888-1890, before returning to England)
- Dora Wilson

Others associated with the Heidelberg School, though not tenants, used Grosvenor Chambers for private showings of their work, as did Florence Fuller in 1890, and David Davies with J. Ford Paterson, and Gordon Coutts in 1894.

Notable photographer Wolfgang Sievers had rooms in the building from after WWII, as did Gordon De Lisle in the 1950s.

== Heritage value ==
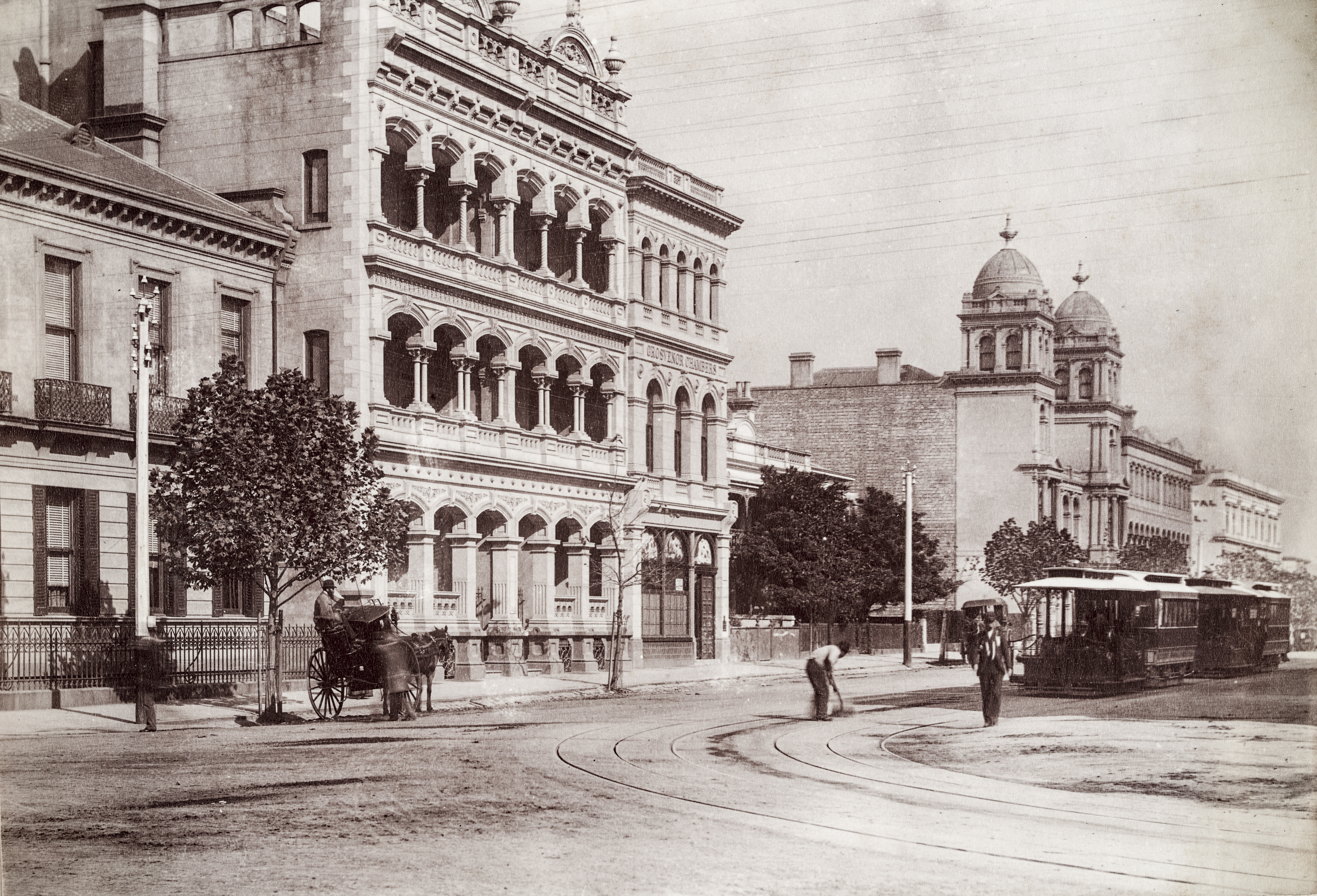
Collins Street, near the corner of Spring Street, showing Grosvenor Chambers at centre soon after construction. Albumen silver photograph 14.0 x 20.0 cm. State Library of Victoria

The building was classified in 1981 by the National Trust which describes it as "an unusually late example of the transitional architectural style between the Conservative Classical Style and the Boom Style Classicism which characterises buildings of the 1880s." With 61 Spring Street, 5-7-9 Collins Street frame a view of "one of Victoria's finest buildings," the Old Treasury Building, integral to the precinct at the east end of Collins Street and the intersection with Spring Street leading up to Parliament House. The Trust describes the buildings as "a unified group in terms of scale and mass whilst at the same time retaining sufficient variety of volume, skyline and architectural detail" and are "a foil to the early twentieth century buildings opposite which are the solution of that time to this singularly important precinct. The buildings are representative of the residential use which was the traditional land use of this end of Collins Street throughout the nineteenth century. The elaborate Boom Style design of Nos. 5 and 7 provides an important contrast to the restrained Conservative Classical design of No. 61 Spring Street, whilst No. 9 repeats the Conservative manner of 61 Spring Street, although constructed well after Nos. 5 and 7," and in this regard the building as of heritage value, though they rate its prime importance as being constructed specifically as artists' studios, no other building in Victoria being associated so closely with the Heidelberg School.

== Partial preservation ==
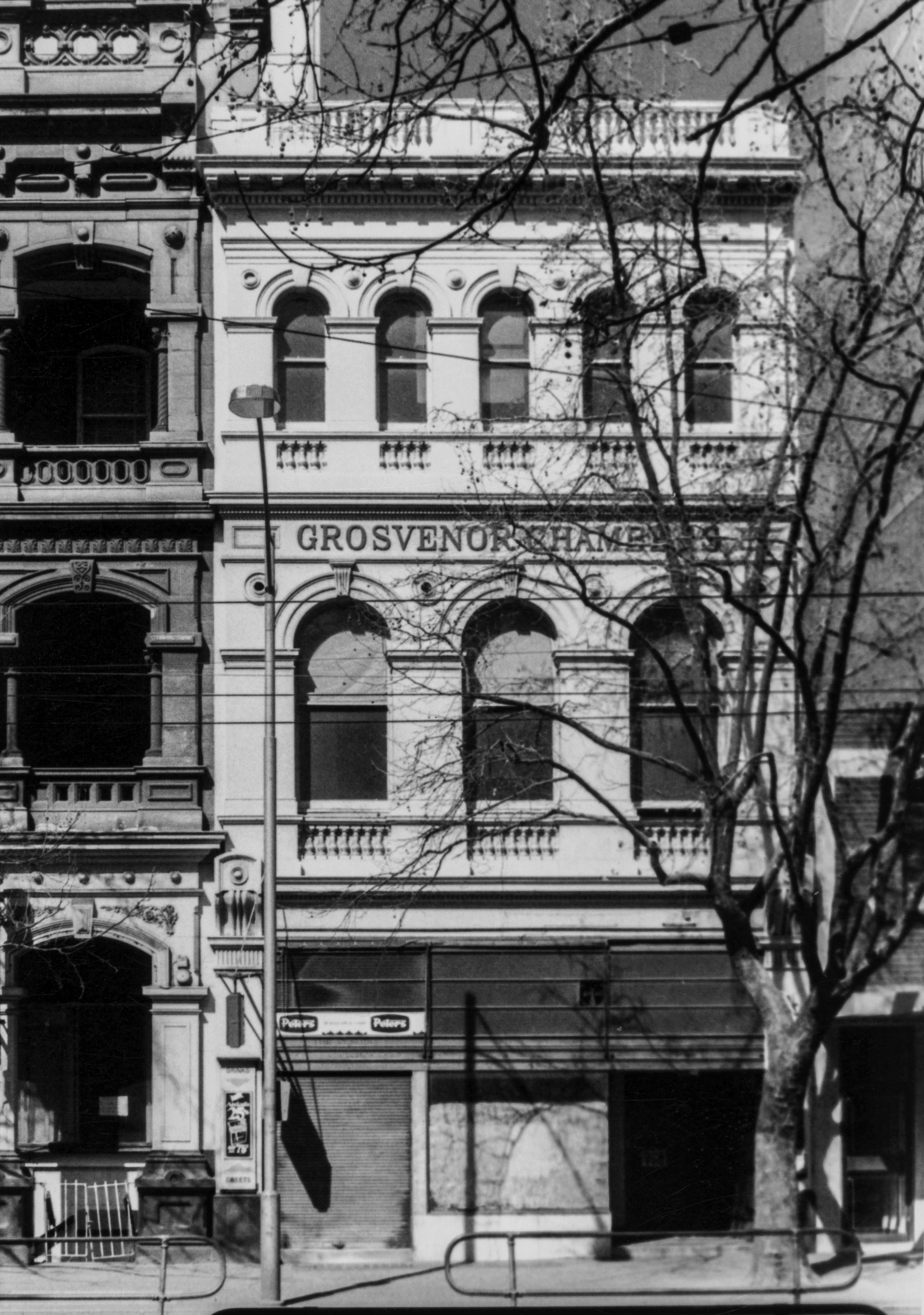
Photograph of Grosvenor Chambers prior to demolition of its interior, 1977

The building was auctioned on November 18, 1970, though artists continued to rent studios there until the mid-1970s, before a plan for an office tower replacing 5-9 Collins Street was proposed. The National Trust, which regarded the historic Treasury precinct as key parts of Melbourne's Victorian architecture, protested along with Dr. Virginia Spate and other stakeholders. The CMI group failed to agree with the preservation council on a plan for development.

Singaporean developer Jack Chia purchased the site in March 1980 for about A$2 million, or A$215 per square metre, and proposed a compromise development retaining Campbell House and a 9m (or one room) depth of the terraces at 5-9 Collins Street including Grosvenor Chambers at 9 Collins in which the studios in the front, and their skylit saw-tooth roof were preserved, with a tower rising behind. It was approved 'in principle' by the National Trust, and the State Government, to assist and encourage the preservation waived land tax for ten years, saving the Chia Group A$100,000 p.a.

In 1979 and 1980 partner in the development Robert Peck worked with the National Trust to reach agreement on preserving and incorporating into the new structure elements of the existing buildings they saw as significant. Architectural historian, Allan Willingham, who questioned "the architectural fad of facade retention in urban redevelopment" considered Chia's development designed and built by Denton, Corker Marshall with Peck Von Hartel Trethowan "one of the few examples in the central business district where an old building has been successfully retained and substantially enhanced."

The tower, known now as 1 Collins Street, was completed in 1984 was noted as one of the city's first postmodern buildings, and for incorporating traditional cement render and deep-set windows, and for its corner tower (then containing the apartment of developer Chia). In 1985 it won the Victorian Architecture Merit Award for new commercial buildings, the inaugural William Wilkinson Wardell Medal for the best building of the last three years in 1986, and in 2011, the Enduring Architecture Award from the Australian Institute of Architects (Victorian Chapter).
