= Charles Conder =

Australian artist (1868–1909)

Charles Edward Conder
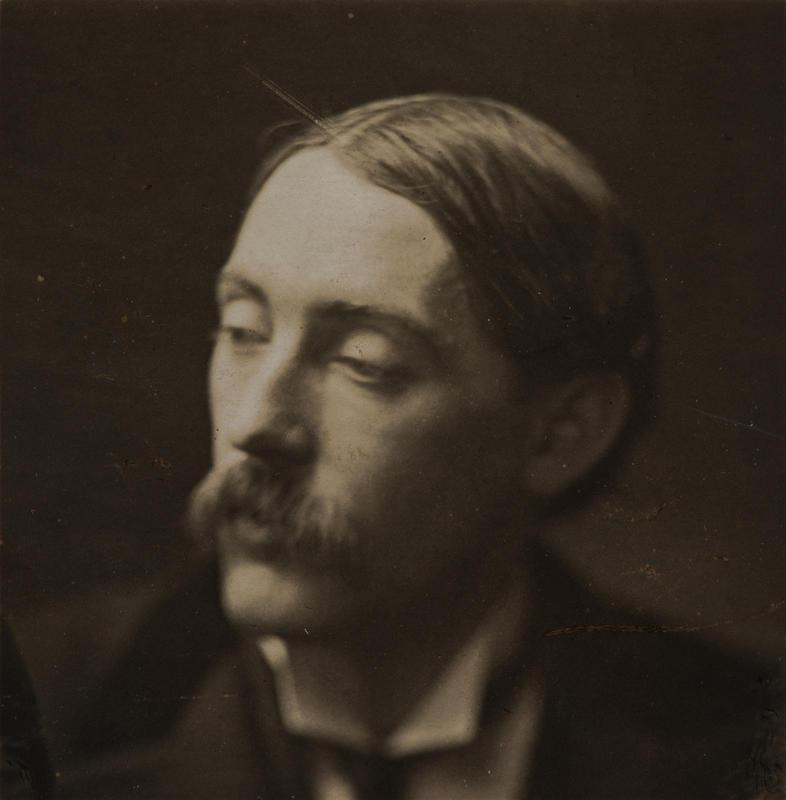
- Born: Charles Edward Conder; 24 October 1868; Tottenham, Middlesex, England
- Died: 9 February 1909 (aged 40); Virginia Water, Surrey, England
- Known for: Painting
- Awards: Holy Cross

Charles Edward Conder (24 October 1868 – 9 February 1909) was an English-born painter, lithographer and designer. He emigrated to Australia and was a key figure in the Heidelberg School, arguably the beginning of a distinctively Australian tradition in Western art.

== Biography ==
=== Birth and early years ===
Conder was born in Tottenham, Middlesex, the second son, of six children, of James Conder, civil engineer and Mary Ann Ayres. He spent several years as a young child in India until the death of his mother (aged 31 years) on 14 May 1873 in Bombay, when Charles was four; he was then sent back to England and attended a number of schools including a boarding school at Eastbourne, which he attended from 1877. He left school at 15, and his very religious, non-artistic father, against Charles's natural artistic inclinations, decided that he should follow in his footsteps as a civil engineer.

=== Australia ===
In 1884, at the age of 16, he was sent to Sydney, Australia, where he worked for his uncle, a land surveyor for the New South Wales government. However he disliked the work, much preferring to draw the landscape rather than survey it. In 1886, he left the job and became an artist for the Illustrated Sydney News, where he was in the company of other artists such as Albert Henry Fullwood, Frank Mahony and Benjamin Edwin Minns. He also joined the Art Society of New South Wales, attended the painting classes of Alfred James Daplyn, and went on plein air painting excursions with Julian Ashton.

Regarded as perhaps his greatest Sydney painting, Departure of the Orient – Circular Quay (1888) was the culmination of Conder's new mastery of form and brushwork. A dockside scene, it depicts the bustling harbour and ferry berths at Circular Quay in Sydney Cove at the moment when the Orient has cast off for her voyage to England. It was quickly purchased by the Art Gallery of New South Wales, making it the first of Conder's works to enter a public collection.

==== Heidelberg School ====
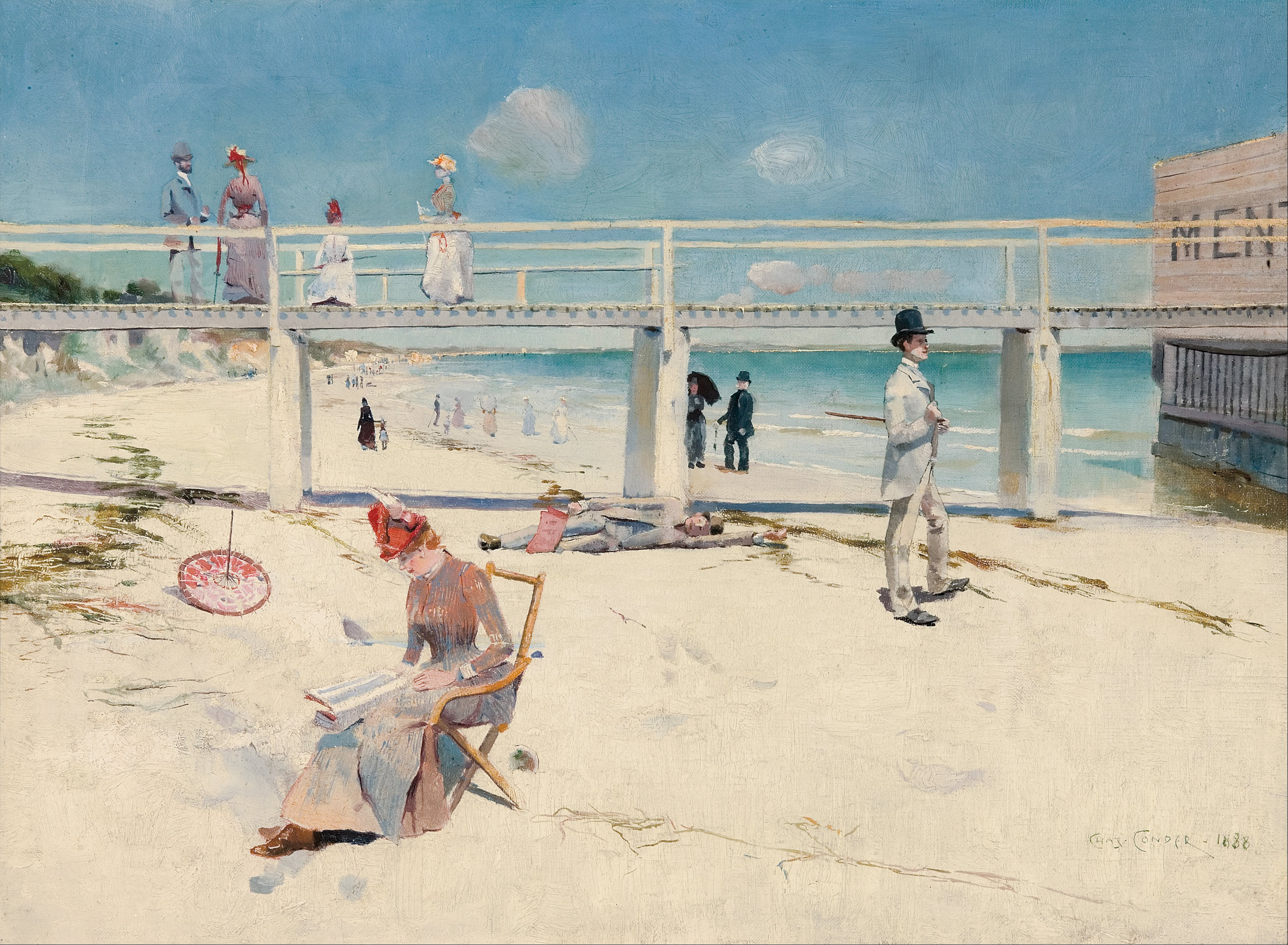
A holiday at Mentone, 1888. This painting featured on a 1984 Australian postage stamp.

In Sydney in 1888, Conder met and painted with plein airist Tom Roberts, then visiting from Melbourne. Later that year, Conder moved to Melbourne to join Roberts and his circle of friends, including painter Arthur Streeton. The trio shared studios and frequently painted together en plein air at artists' camps in rural localities around Melbourne, first at Box Hill and, from late 1888, in Heidelberg. They came to be regarded as the core members of the Heidelberg School movement.

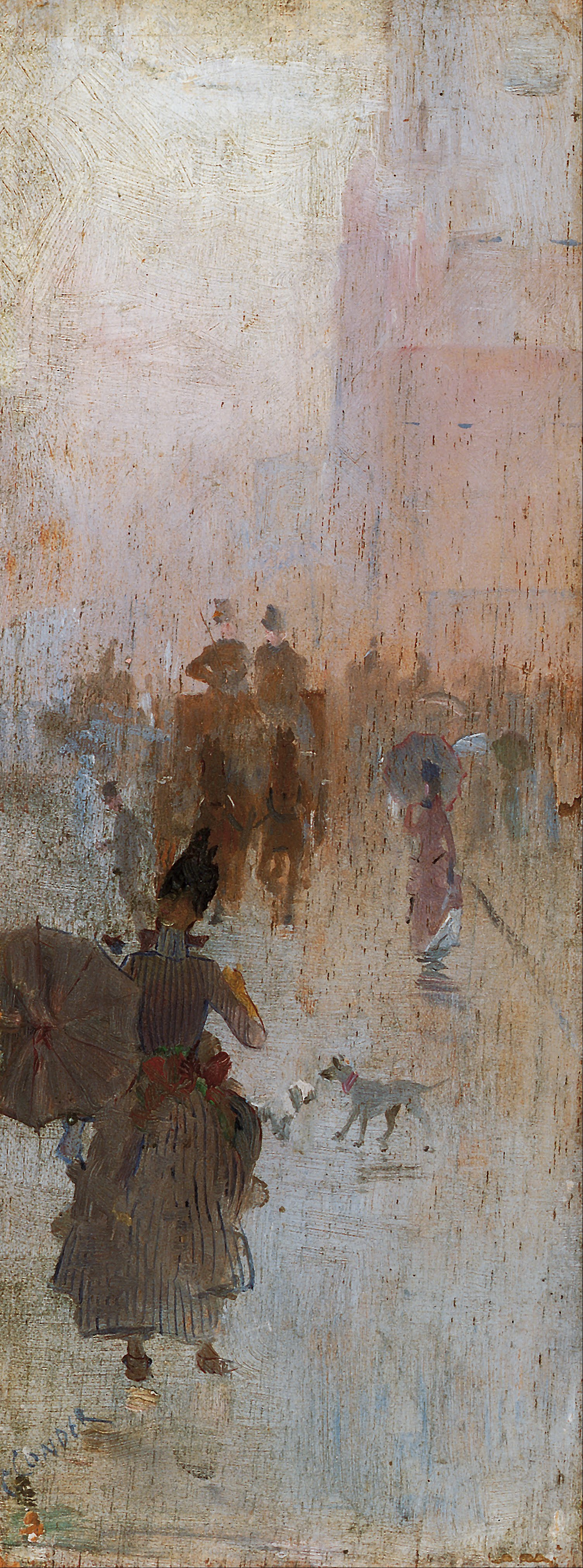
How We Lost Poor Flossie (1889), one of Conder's 9 by 5s

In August 1889, Conder, Streeton, Roberts, Frederick McCubbin and Charles Douglas Richardson staged the 9 by 5 Impression Exhibition in Melbourne, establishing themselves as exponents of an Australian variant of impressionism. Conder contributed 46 "impressions" to the show and designed the Symbolist and Art Nouveau-inspired catalogue.

Short of cash, the attractive Conder apparently paid off his landlady by sexual means, catching syphilis in the process, which was to plague the later years of his life. During his two years in Melbourne, Conder produced a number of famous Heidelberg School works, including Under The Southern Sun. This painting clearly shows the burning sunlight and desolation that can be inflicted by an Australian drought. While other Heidelberg School artists, born and raised in Australia, imbued many of their works with nationalist sentiments, Conder, a believer in the credo of art for art's sake, instead tended to focus on everyday scenes and the pursuit of leisure.

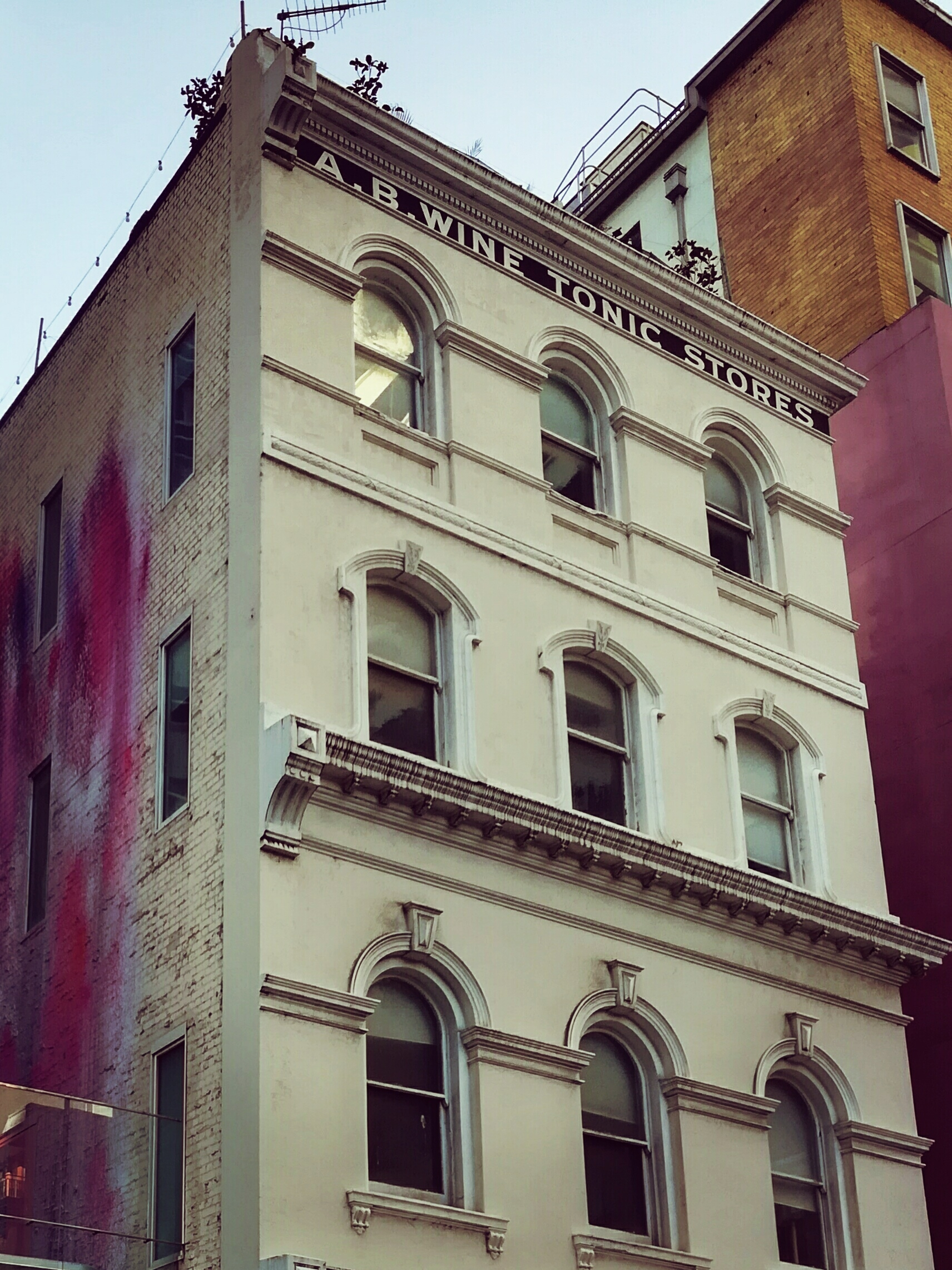
Gordon Chambers, Flinders Lane, Melbourne, where Conder resided with Arthur Streeton and Charles Douglas Richardson

In Melbourne, Conder rekindled his association with G. P. Nerli, an itinerant Italian painter and the bearer of new European influences who has been credited with shaping Conder's development. The extent of the influence has been debated, but the fact of it is undeniable. Like Conder, Nerli was a bon-vivant whose appreciation of the 'dam fine' 'Melbourne girls' survives in a letter to a mutual friend, Percy Spence.

Conder was a fun-loving man who painted with an often humorous touch. While staying with Tom Roberts in his famous Grosvenor Chambers studio, he painted A holiday at Mentone (1888), which shows men and women at the beach relaxing while clothed from head to foot–the men in suits and hats; the ladies in long, girdled dresses with boots and pretty hats. The man and woman at the front of the painting face away from each other, yet possibly are interested in each other, each watching the other from the corner of their eye. The mood is one of simple elegance and with a relaxed feel, as in the background people are strolling along the beach into the distance. The composition of the painting has possibly been borrowed from a work by Whistler in which a bridge similarly transects the picture.

During his Melbourne residence, Conder stayed with Roberts at his Grosvenor Chambers studio, then moved into Gordon Chambers with Streeton and Richardson. In March 1890, in the lead up to the Victorian Artists' Society's Winter exhibition, the trio staged a show at their Gordon Chambers studio, featuring Heidelberg and "up country" landscapes.

=== European avant-garde ===
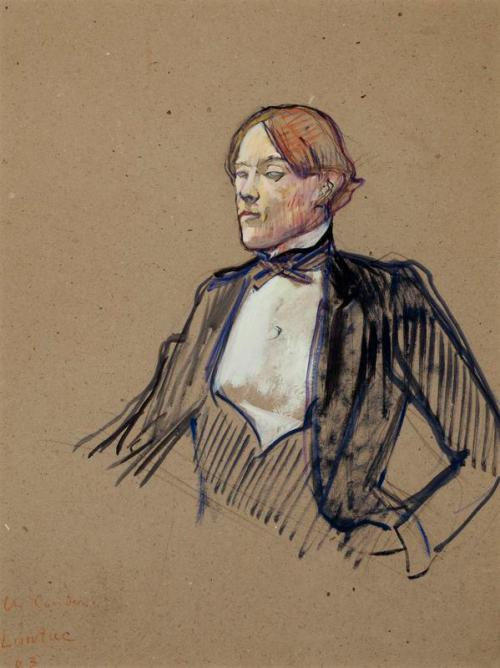
Portrait of Conder by Henri de Toulouse-Lautrec, 1893

Conder left Australia in 1890, and spent the rest of his life in Europe, at first in Britain, then France for extended periods. He moved to Paris and studied at the Académie Julian, where he befriended several avant-garde artists, including Henri de Toulouse-Lautrec, who painted his portrait and featured him in at least two of his Moulin Rouge works. Conder became linked to the aesthetic movement, mixing with the likes of Oscar Wilde and Aubrey Beardsley. He was also the subject of portraits by William Rothenstein, William Orpen, Jacques-Emile Blanche and Augustus John.

In 1895, Conder designed a room within the art gallery Maison de l'Art Nouveau, which opened that year in Paris. Later in 1895, he visited Dieppe, socialising among the artistic community and the English families with their attractive daughters, as described by Simona Pakenham in her study of the English people there in the century before World War I. His friends remembered him as " a sick man, unable to face reality". In spite of drunken spells, disreputable company and sporadic output, Conder's powers as an artist won him acclaim. He made a specialty of painting on silk, relatively easy on silk fans, but he excelled on one occasion when he painted a series of white silk gowns worn by Alexandra Thaulow, wife of Norwegian painter Frits Thaulow, while she stood on a table, the gowns becoming "coloured like a field of flowers". One of his painted fans inspired The Sanguine Fan, a 1917 ballet by Edward Elgar.

In Dieppe, Conder met Aubrey Beardsley, but they did not like each other. He continued to paint, but his output was severely affected by the continual poor health, including paralysis and a bout of delirium tremens.

He married a wealthy widow, Stella Maris Belford (née MacAdams) at The British Embassy Paris on 5 December 1901, giving him financial security. His later works are not nearly as well regarded critically as his earlier Australian paintings.

=== Later life and death ===
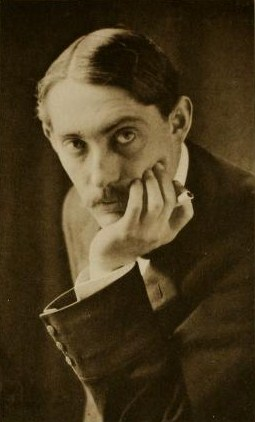
Photographic portrait of Conder

He spent the last year of his life in a sanatorium, and died in Holloway Sanatorium of "general paresis of the insane", in modern terms tertiary syphilis. In death, Conder's work was rated highly by many notable artists, such as Pissarro and Degas.

The Canberra suburb of Conder, established in 1991, was named after him. Satirist Barry Humphries was a major aficionado and collector of the artist, and at one time had the world's largest private collection of Conder's work.

== See also ==
- Australian art

== Bibliography ==
- Galbally, Ann. Charles Conder: the last bohemian, Miegunyah Press: Melbourne University (2002) Book summary
- Gibson, Frank & Dodgson, Campbell. Charles Conder; his life and work (London: John Lane, 1914).
- Pakenham, Simona. Sixty Miles from England: The English at Dieppe 1814-1914, (London, Macmillan, 1967).
- Rothenstein, John. The Life and Death of Conder, (London: J.M. Dent & Sons, 1938; New York: E.P. Dutton, c.1938).
- Gibson, Frank W. (1912). "Conder, Charles" . In Lee, Sidney (ed.). Dictionary of National Biography (2nd supplement). London: Smith, Elder & Co.
- Art Gallery of New South Wales: highlights from the collection (2008), Edmund Capon (England; Australia, b.1940) (Author), Art Gallery of New South Wales (Australia, estab. 1874), Sydney, New South Wales, Australia.
- 'K' is for Conder: Charles Conder retrospective (2003), Public Programmes Department, Art Gallery of New South Wales (Australia) (Author), Art Gallery of New South Wales (Australia, estab. 1874), Domain, Sydney, New South Wales, Australia.
- Charles Conder 1868–1909 (2003), Ann Galbally (Australia) (Author), Barry Pearce (Australia) (Author), Barry Humphries (Australia, b.1934) (Author), Art Gallery of New South Wales (Australia, estab. 1874), Domain, Sydney, New South Wales, Australia.
- Australian art: in the Art Gallery of New South Wales (2000), Barry Pearce (Australia) (Author), Art Gallery of New South Wales (Australia, estab. 1874), Domain, Sydney, New South Wales, Australia.
- Art Gallery of New South Wales Handbook (1999), Bruce James (Australia) (Author), Edmund Capon (England; Australia, b.1940) (Director), Trustees of the Art Gallery of New South Wales (Australia), Domain, Sydney, New South Wales, Australia.
- The Art Gallery of New South Wales collections (1994), Ewen McDonald (Australia) (Editor), Art Gallery of New South Wales (Australia, estab. 1874), Sydney, New South Wales, Australia.
- Art Gallery of New South Wales Handbook (1988), Annabel Davie (Editor), Trustees of the Art Gallery of New South Wales (Australia), Domain, Sydney, New South Wales, Australia.
- The Artist & the City (1983), Brian Ladd (Australia) (Author), Alan Krell (Author), Art Gallery of New South Wales (Australia, estab. 1874), Domain, Sydney, New South Wales, Australia.
- Art Gallery of New South Wales picturebook (1972), Editor Unknown (Editor), Trustees of the Art Gallery of New South Wales (Australia), Domain, Sydney, New South Wales, Australia.
- Charles Conder: 1868–1909 (1966), Dr Ursula Hoff (England; Australia, b.1909, d.2005) (Author), Art Gallery of New South Wales (Australia, estab. 1874), Sydney, New South Wales, Australia.
- Art Gallery of New South Wales Quarterly (Jan 1960), Hal Missingham (Australia, b.1906, d.1994) (Editor), Art Gallery of New South Wales (Australia, estab. 1874), Sydney, New South Wales, Australia.
- A catalogue of Australian oil paintings in the National Art Gallery of New South Wales 1875–1952 (1953), Bernard Smith (Australia, b.1916, d.2011) (Author), Art Gallery of New South Wales (Australia, estab. 1874), Sydney, New South Wales, Australia.
- A retrospective exhibition of Australian painting (1953), Hal Missingham (Australia, b.1906, d.1994) (Author), National Art Gallery of New South Wales (Australia, estab. 1874), Domain, Sydney, New South Wales, Australia.
- 100 years of Australian painting (1948), Bernard Smith (Australia, b.1916, d.2011) (Author), National Art Gallery of New South Wales (Australia, estab. 1874), Sydney, New South Wales, Australia.
- 150 years of Australian art (1938), Lionel Lindsay (Australia, b.1874, d.1961) (Author), Trustees of the National Art Gallery of New South Wales (Australia), Sydney, New South Wales, Australia.
- Fifty years of Australian art 1879–1929 (1929), George Galway (Australia) (Author), Royal Art Society of New South Wales Press (Australia), New South Wales, Australia.
- Elwyn Lynn (author) Charles Conder The Australian Landscape and its Artists, Bay Books 1977 pp 60–65
