= Robert Henderson Croll =

Australian writer and public servant

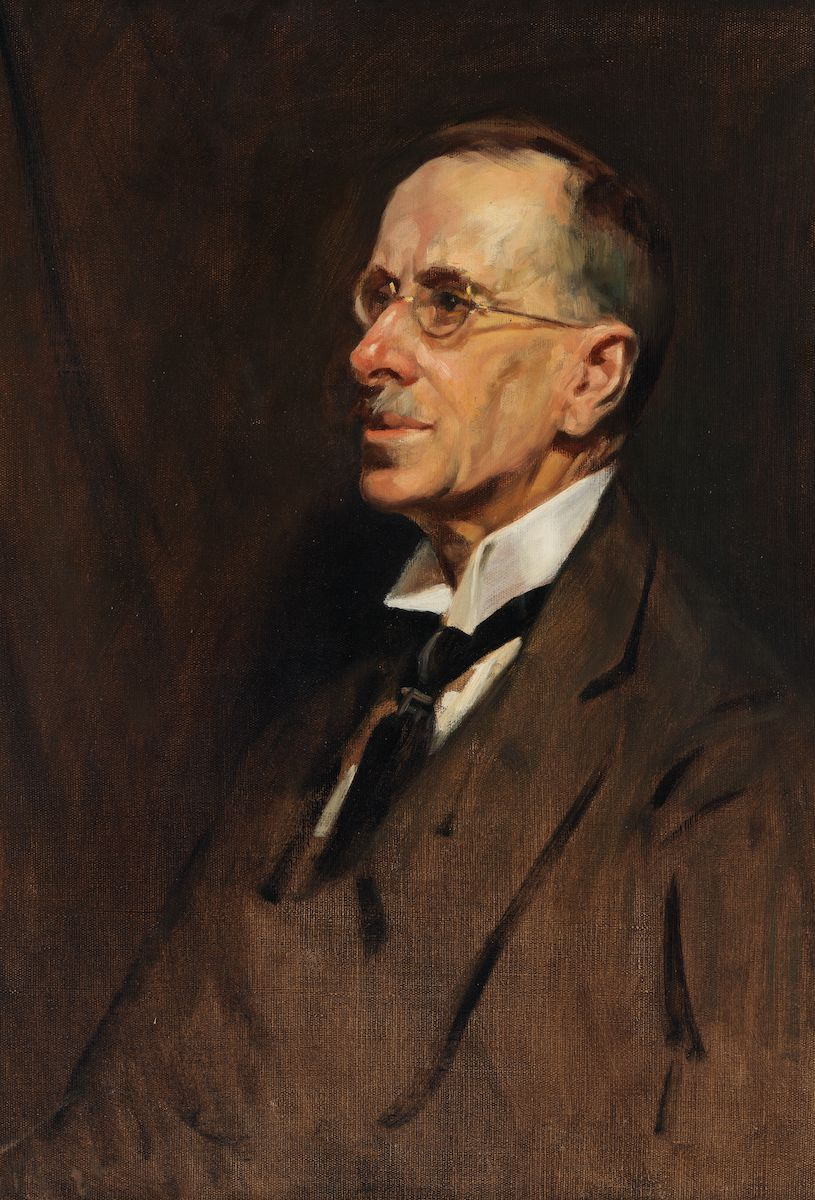
Robert Henderson Croll painted by Frederick George Reynolds in 1927

Robert Henderson Croll (5 January 1869 – 18 October 1947) was an Australian writer, poet, bushwalker, and public servant. The Australian Dictionary of Biography (ADB) characterises him as noteworthy for his "diverse contribution to cultural and intellectual life," with his prominence in art curation, writing and editing poetry, engaging in and journalling about athletics (specifically cross country running and bushwalking, for which the ADB credits him as doing "possibly...more than anyone else in his time to encourage").

During his lifetime he built up a significant book collection. He had a special interest in Australian poetry and prose, especially first editions.

== Recognition ==
A bust of Croll by Orlando Dutton won the Melrose Prize for portraiture in 1938.

== Bibliography (chronological) ==
Library Catalogues consulted:

- State Library of New South Wales. Accessed 8 March 2015
- National Library of Australia. Accessed 8 March 2015.
- State Library of Victoria. Accessed 8 March 2015.
- Trove. Accessed 8 March 2015.
- Papers of Robert Henderson Croll: manuscripts, printed matter, typescripts, photographs, correspondence ca. 1920–1998. (Held by State Library of Victoria)
- Autographs collected by Robert Henderson Croll: governors, ministers of the Crown, actors, sportsmen, etc. (Held by State Library of Victoria)
- The etched work of John Shirlow: selected reproductions in half-tone of John Shirlow's handicraft, edited by R. H. Croll, 192?
- Matthew Flinders, Navigator and Scientist: his services to Australia, The Argus, 7 November 1925
- Australasian Anthology, by Percival Serle, assisted by R. H. Croll, 1927
- The Open Road in Victoria: Being the Ways of Many Walkers, 1928 (travel)
- Along the Track, 1930 (travel)
- Has Lawson's Verse any Permanent Value?, J. Le Gay Brereton, R. H. Croll, Zora Cross, Percival Serle, Frederick John Broomfield, E. J. Brady, David McKee Wright, 'Desiderata', February no. 3 1930; (p. 31–33) (correspondence)
- "The Best Old Town of All": song and words by Robert H. Croll, music by Jessica A. Dalkin, 1931. (music)
- Wonderful Walks in Victoria, from The Betterment and Publicity Board Victorian Railways, 1931. (booklet) — (The Booklet indicates that "Most of the information concerning the walks has been supplied by Mr. R. H. Croll, one of the leading authorities on walking in Victoria, and by Mr. W. F. Waters, Secretary of the Melbourne Amateur Walking and Touring Club. Mr. Croll's books, 'The Open Road in Victoria,' and 'Along the Track,' deal in detail with many of these walks.)
- By-Products: A Book of Verses, edited by Percival Serle, 1932 (poetry)
- Collected Poems of John Shaw Neilson, Edited by and Introduction by R. H. Croll, 1934 (poetry)
- Tom Roberts: Father of Australian Landscape Painting, 1935 (biography) — Papers relating to this biography are held by National Library of Australia
- Wide Horizons: Wanderings in Central Australia, 1937 (travel)
- Dr Alexander Thomson: a Pioneer of Melbourne and Founder of Geelong, 1937 — in collaboration with Roland R Wettenhall (biography)
- Yarumpa, the honey-pot: food in the wilderness, 'Walkabout', vol. 3 page3, no. 16, 1937
- The life and work of R. W. Sturgess, with a foreword by R. H. Croll, 1938. (fine arts)
- Bob Croll Looks Back, 'Life Digest', II, 1 December 1939, pp.83–7 (autobiography)
- I Recall: Collections and Recollections, 1939. (autobiography)
- The Laureate of the Larrikin: (Some Memories of 'Den'), Australian National Review, May vol. 5 no. 29 1939; (p. 39-42) (biography)
- On the edge of the wild: a camp with the Arunta, 'Walkabout' vol.5, no.4; p17-20, 1939
- The etched work of Victor Cobb, edited by R. H. Croll, 1940
- Australia's dying heart: soil erosion in the inland, Jock H. Pick, with introduction by R. H. Croll, 1942
- Sonny, 'The Bulletin', 9 December vol. 63 no. 3278 1942; (p. 4) (short story)
- Cold Collation: "Mutton! Of course. What else could I expect", 'The Bulletin', 28 April vol. 64 no. 3298 1943; (p. 12) (poetry)
- The Way Home, 'The Bulletin', 17 March vol. 64 no. 3292 1943; (p. 4) (short story)
- Art of the Australian Aboriginal, Charles Barrett and R. H. Croll; with a foreword by A. P. Elkin, 1943.
- Argonauts Returned and other poems, by R. A. Swan; with a foreword by R. H. Croll, 1946 (poetry)
- Gippslands secret lake, 'Walkabout' vol.12, no.3; pp. 18–19, 1946
- An Autobituary, Bread and Cheese Club, 1946 (autobiography)
- Smike to Bulldog: Letters from Sir Arthur Streeton to Tom Roberts, 1946 – Edited by R. H. Croll (correspondence)
- The Charity Sermon, 'Focus', April vol. 2 no. 2 1947; (p. 17–18) (short story)
- The Sight of Means, 'Focus', November vol. 2 no. 9 1947; (p. 8–19) (short story)
- Umph the Gargoyle, with woodcuts by Allan Jordan, 1947 (brochure)
- The Model Murder, 'Focus', March vol. 3 no. 1 1948; (p. 11–12) (short story)
- The Art of Albert Namatjira, C. P. Mountford; foreword by R. H. Croll, 1951
- Melbourne Walking Club: a history 1894–1964, R.H. Croll & R. G. Hemmy; with appendices and a mini-history by A. Budge; assembled by Ken Sargeant, 1995
- Robert Henderson Croll: writings from the Melbourne Walker 1929–1959, assembled by Ken Sargeant, Melbourne, 1997.
- Melbourne Amateur Walking & Touring Club: reports of activities 1911–1921, from the Weekly Times and the Leader and other papers, Collected by Ken Sargeant, 1997.
