= Victorian Artists' Society =

Artists' collective in Melbourne, Victoria, Australia

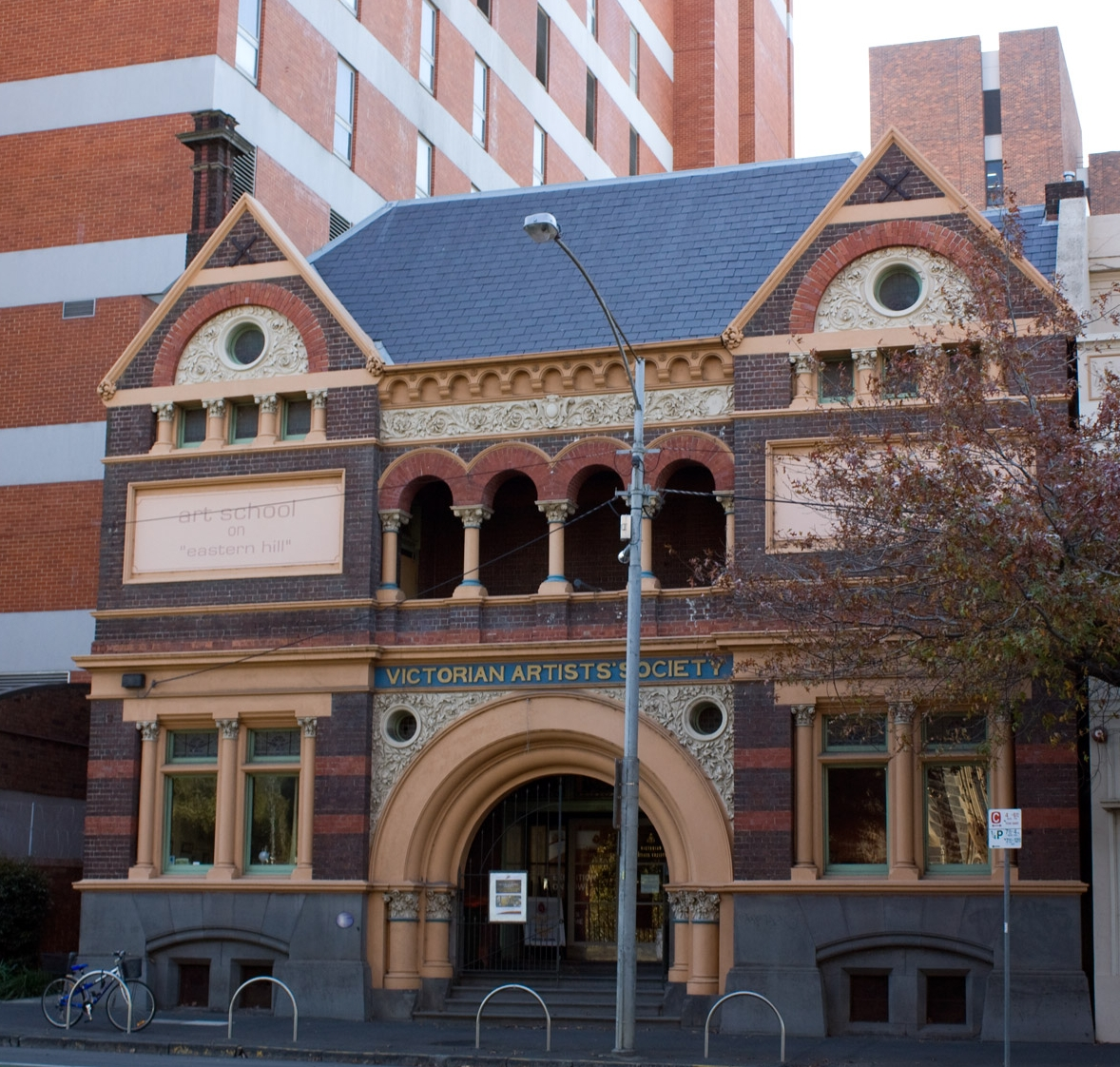
- Location: 430 Albert St, East Melbourne VIC 3002
- Type: Art Gallery
- Accreditation: Art Institution
- Founder: Louis Buvelot
- President: Eileen Mackley
- Employees: 8
- Website: https://vasgallery.org.au

The Victorian Artists' Society, which can trace its establishment to 1856 in Melbourne, promotes artistic education, art classes and gallery hire exhibition in Australia. It was formed in March 1888 when the Victorian Academy of Arts (previously Victorian Society of Fine Arts) and the Australian Artists' Association amalgamated.

The Victorian Artists’ Society is a not-for-profit organisation and charity registered with the Victorian government. The Artists' Society routinely practices a range of art forms and styles through classes and gatherings in their permanent home, a heritage-listed bluestone building on Albert Street, Melbourne, opposite St. Patrick's Cathedral. As of 2021, the Victorian Artists' Society premises include four galleries, members’ rooms, an administrative office, and the original bluestone studio which operates as an art school. The original studio was not finished until 1902.

The general public can view the seasonal collections of artworks in the gallery or buy artworks. The gallery is open seven days a week and entry is free. New exhibitions are held fortnightly within the five galleries.

== History ==
The Victorian Artists' Society has strong connections to earlier art societies, academies and associations established in Melbourne, often with interlocking memberships, notably James Smith the art critic on Melbourne's Argus who was a member of the first society.

The Victorian Society of Fine Arts was established in 1856. Beyond a few exhibitions of that society, there was no cohesive art movement in Melbourne until the Victorian Academy of Arts was formed in 1870 with "about twenty artists and amateurs" amongst its first members, including Eliezer Levi Montefiore. The Victorian Academy of Arts held annual exhibitions from 1871 to 1887.

In 1886 a group of professional artists formed the Australian Artists' Association. The artists included: John Mather, Mr. Addison, Mr. G. R. Ashton, Mr. Percival Ball, Signor Catani, James Waltham Curtis, Mr. McCubbin, Mr. Gibbs, Signor Habres, Mr. Kahler, Signor Tocein, Signor Neele, Mr. Patterson, Mr. Rolando, Mr. T. Roberts and Mr. Turner. The association held its first exhibition in 1886, with works by Tom Roberts, Louis Buvelot, Frederick McCubbin, Arthur Streeton, John Ford Paterson, John Mather and many others.

When opening the association's exhibition, James Smith, on behalf of the exhibiting artists stated that the association had not been formed in any spirit of opposition or rivalry with the older academy and that there was room for both. Ultimately this was not to be the case.

John Mather was also a longstanding member of the Victorian Academy of Arts and worked towards bringing the two organisations together. In March 1888 the Academy and the Association amalgamated. On John Mather's motion, seconded by John Ford Paterson, the amalgamated organisation was named the Victorian Artist's Society.

During its early establishment, the Artists’ Society met in a private house in St. Kilda. Its founding members included landscape painter Louis Buvelot, painter Hubert de Castella and etcher J.A. Panton. The Artists’ Society was known for throwing parties and picnics at Brighton. By the 1890s, there were 400 members.

The first president of the new Society was Joseph Anderson Panton. He was succeeded by John Mather who held the position for many years. Subsequent presidents included John Ford Paterson, Frederick McCubbin, Walter Withers, F.H. Bruford, W. Montgomery, Max Meldrum, C. Douglas Richardson, Sir John Longstaff, Paul Raphael Montford and Louis McCubbin.

The premises at 430 Albert Street in East Melbourne were erected for the society in 1888, enlarged in 1892, modernised in 1953, and substantially renovated in 1973 and 2015. Facilities include four galleries, teaching studio, members room, offices and other ancillary facilities.

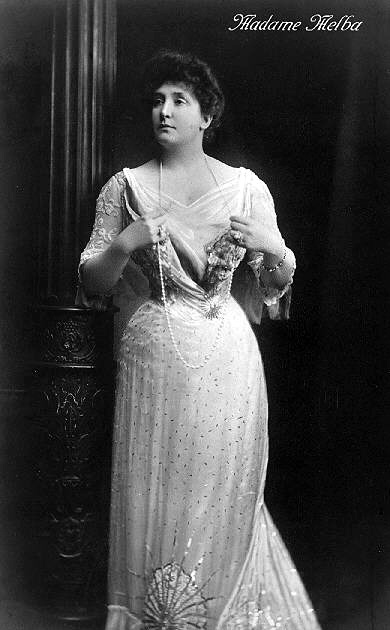
Photograph of Dame Nellie Melba

This historical building was not limited to fine arts and was also established as a music conservatory that offered singing lessons by Nellie Melba. Melba taught music lessons at the historical building from 1915 until close to her death in 1931. She would perform to crowds outside from the balcony of the house. In 2014, the Society honoured Melba with a special plaque for the gallery to record her musical history at the Victorian Artists’ Society. The Artists’ Society was a starting point for young artists of the Heidelberg school, a Victorian impressionist art movement of the 19th century, to exhibit their work and make their first major sales. Artists of the Heidelberg school who were active members of the Victorian Artists’ Society included Charles Conder, Frederick McCubbin, Arthur Streeton, and Tom Roberts.

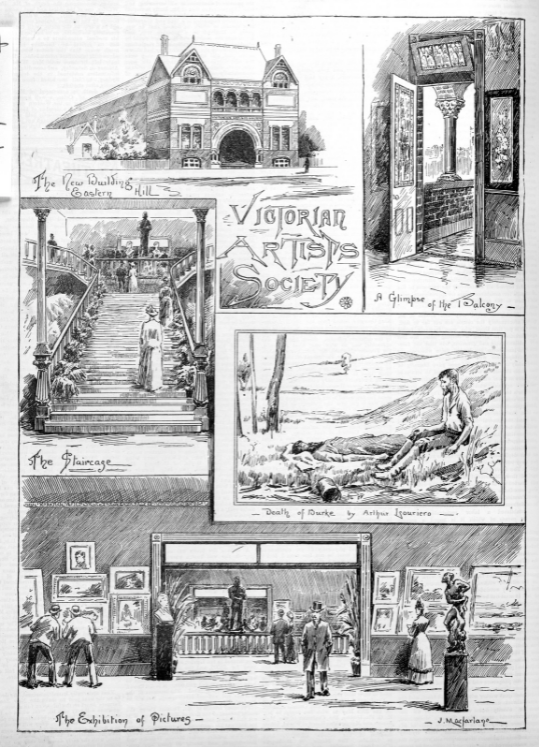
1892 Illustration of the Victorian Artists' Society

Max Meldrum, the Victorian Artists’ Society president in 1917, taught tonal realism at the gallery studio. In 1918 he left the Victorian Artists’ Society to form a separate group in his studio in Hardware Chambers, Elizabeth Street, Melbourne, later to become the Twenty Melbourne Painters Society.

Most of the early exhibitors in the Society were women.

Albert Tucker, an Australian artist, and member of the Heide Circle, went to night art classes at the Victorian Artists’ Society studio in the 1930s.

In 1938, at a VAS meeting, artists interested in contemporary styles joined George Bell to form the Victorian branch of Contemporary Artists’ Society (CAS), which is still active.

== Today ==
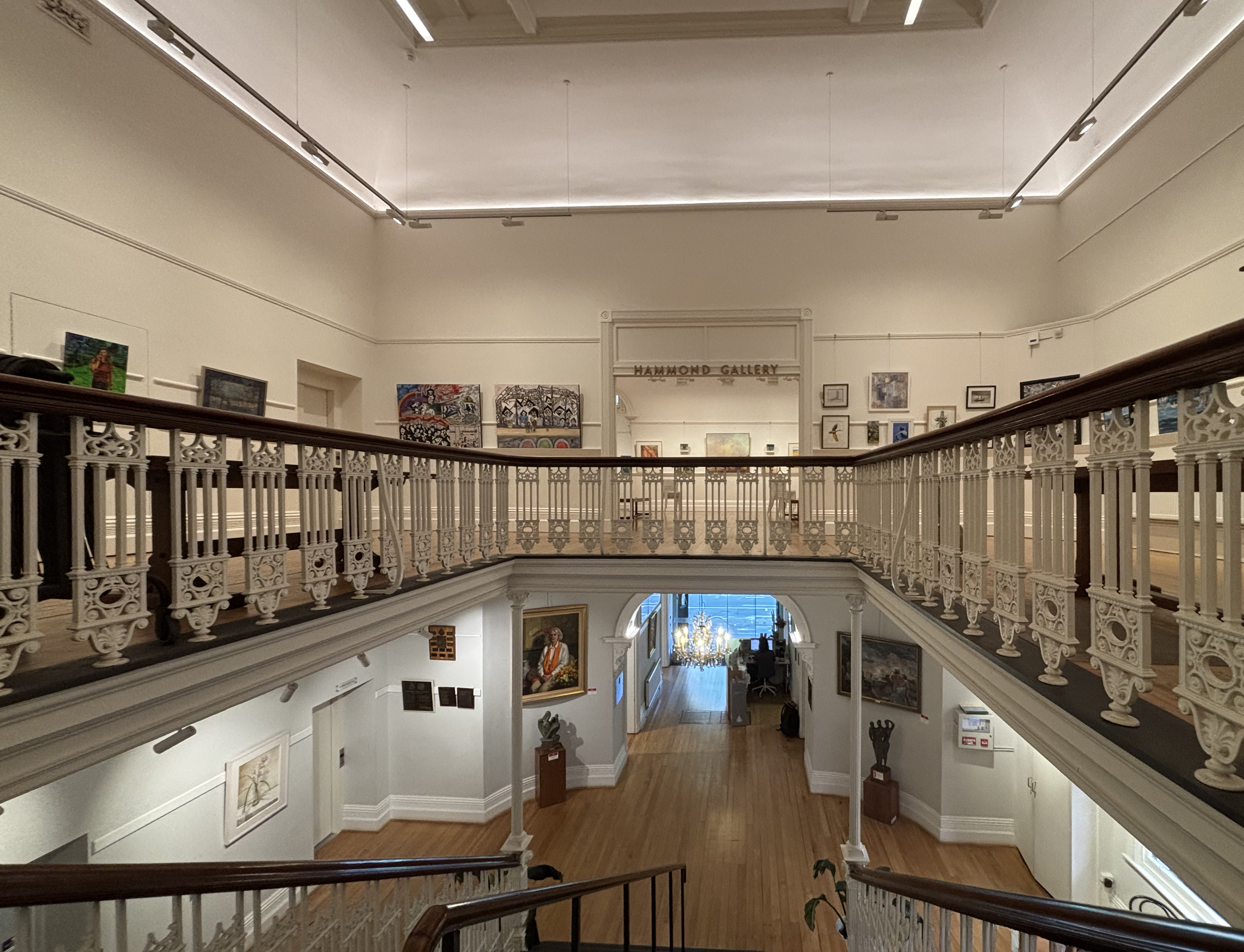
Victorian Artists' Society, 2026 view toward entrance and Hammond Gallery

As at 2021, The Victorian Artists' Society is a gallery and public learning centre offering public exhibitions, art lessons, gallery space for hire, workshops, and paid opportunities for working Victorian artists.

Art classes and workshops are offered to a minimum age of 16 and operate in four term sessions a year. Classes include painting, watercolour, pastel, oil, acrylic, drawing, and sculpture. 18 different art classes are offered each week in the studio. The gallery viewing hours operate from 10am to 4pm Monday to Friday, and 11am to 4pm on Saturday and Sunday. The gallery is closed on public holidays. Classes are held in the everyday of the week.

Membership is restricted to 1000, a figure last reached in 1979, and is open for new members to join for approximately $90. Membership is open to all persons interested in the fine arts, with the emphasis on practising artists.

As of 2021, the current society president is Eileen Mackley, who joined the VAS board 29 December 2008, and was appointed president 5 December 2013. Ron Smith is head of media enquiries.

Exhibitions are held annually, including the seasonal spring, summer, autumn and winter exhibitions, with awards given at each. Every year, the society presents the ‘Mavis Little VAS Artist of the Year Award’ to the artist receiving the most votes from exhibitors through that year.

In 2020, The Victorian Artists’ Society launched an online art gallery called creating the opportunity for local Victorian artists to sell their works to a domestic and international online audience. The mediums of art for sale included paintings, sculptures, prints and digital art. This free of charge online event ran from 26 August to 31 December 2020.

In 2020, the Victorian Artists’ Society celebrated their 150th anniversary. The society released with historical information, drawings, and photographs, titled ‘Victorian Artists Society 1870 – 2020 Celebrating 150 Years’, edited by Rosemary Noble. Celebrating 150 years of the Artists’ Society on March 10, 2020, the Governor of Victoria, Linda Dessau AC, in her speech remarked that “almost every notable Australian painter from the late 19th to early 20th centuries was associated with the VAS. Fortunately for the people of Victoria, and thanks to the National Gallery of Victoria, many of their works grace the walls at Government House.”

== Building restoration ==
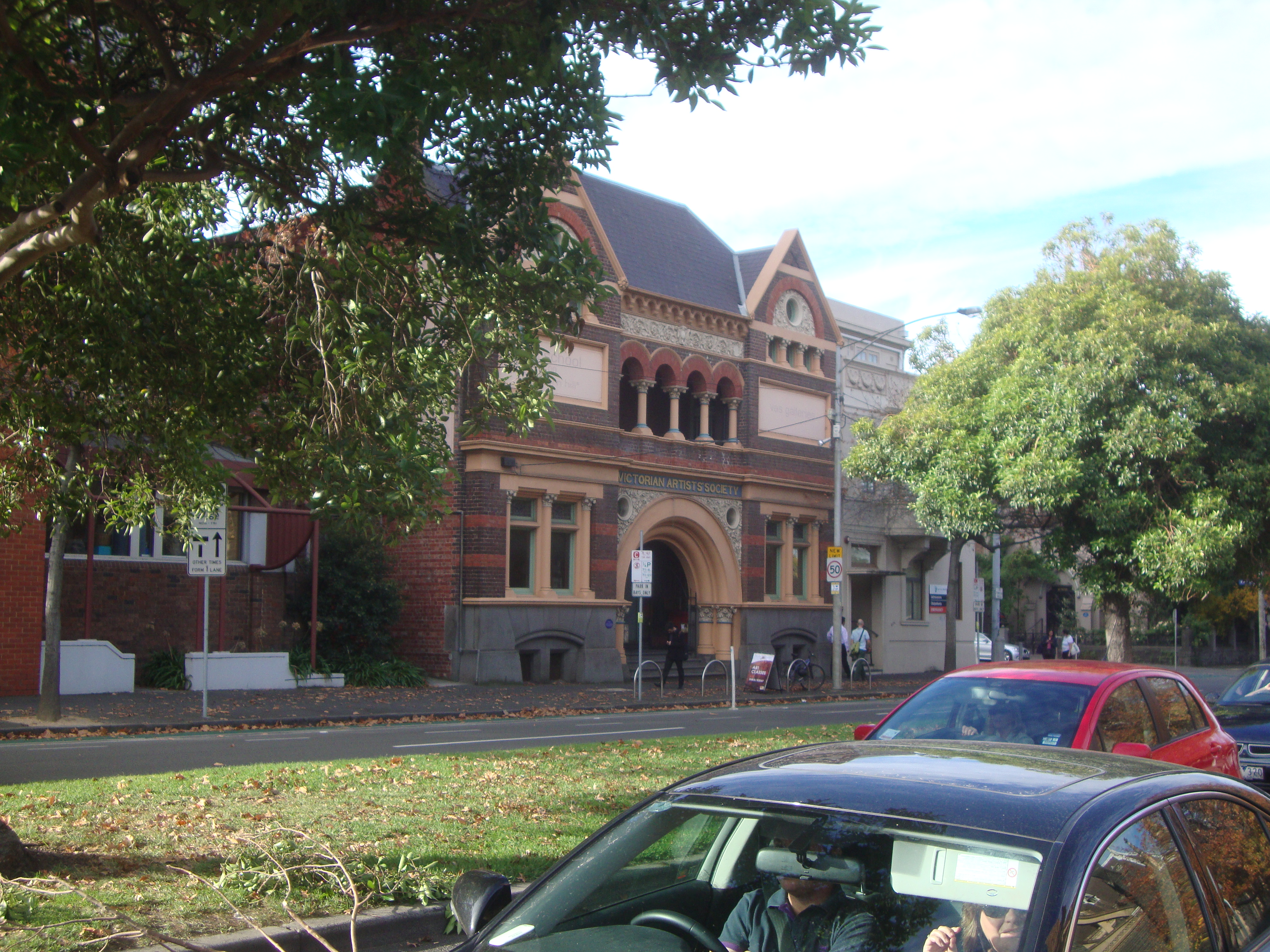
The Victorian Artists' Society building, Albert Street, East Melbourne

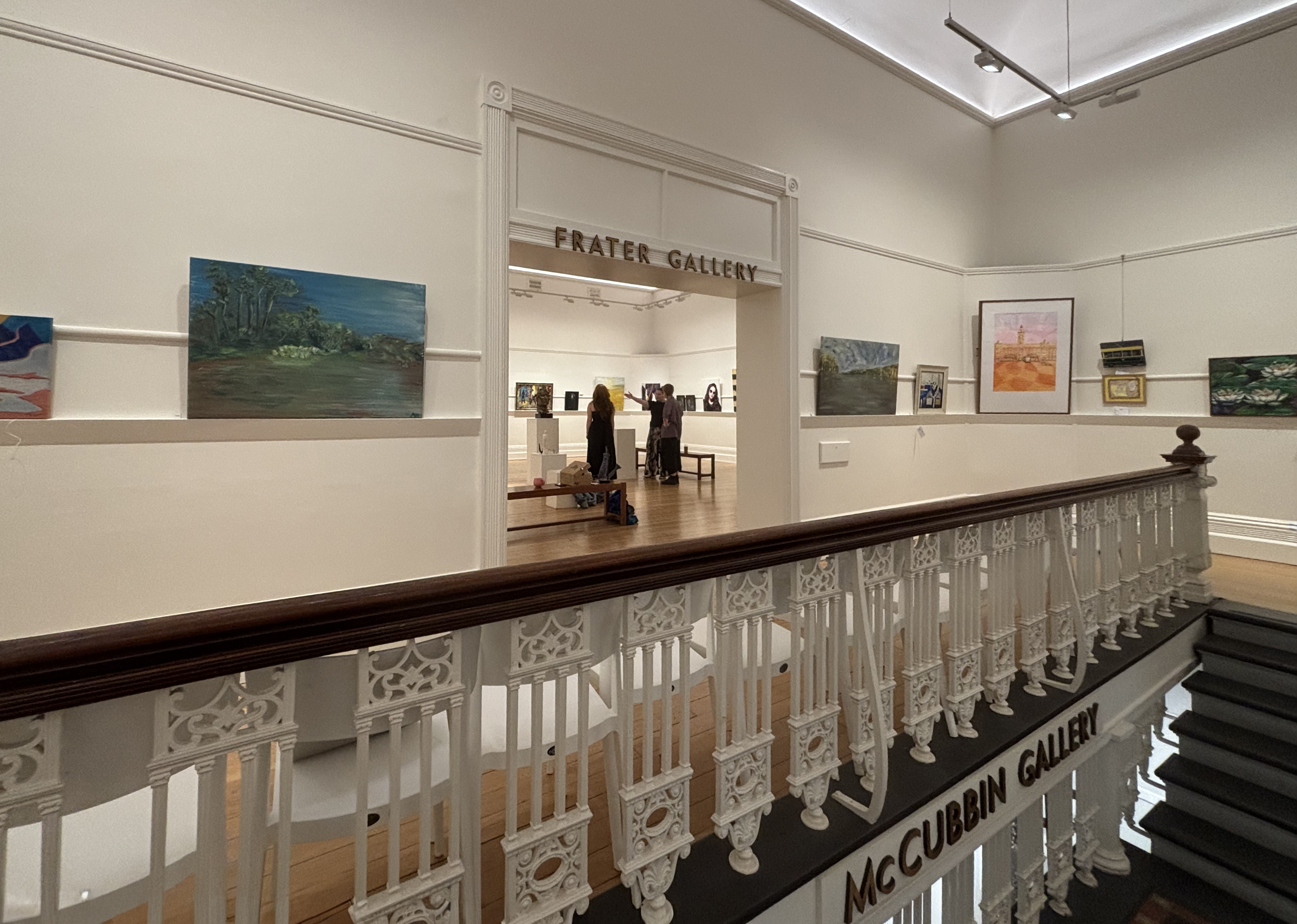
Victorian Artist Society 2026 view from the McCubbin Gallery into the Frater Gallery

The Victorian Artists’ Society building is Heritage and National Trust listed given its historic importance since 1873, when a grant of land on Albert street became available and allowed for a modest structure. The building is in an equally notable precinct, opposite St. Patrick's Cathedral and 600m from Parliament House. According to Professor Miles Lewis of the Australian Architectural Index, the building was originally one-story with measurements of 14.3m x 9.1 x 6m, built by Corben & Stuart. The Romanesque-style building was originally designed by architect Leonard Terry, a designer of warehouses and banks, and Richard Speight.

The house underwent renovations in the late 1970s, with fluorescent lighting installed, which later was modernised with spotlight tracks. Although the building has been renovated, the original 1873 studio and 1892 staircase, galleries, and balcony remain. The original Baltic pine floor, tables, and easels still remain the same. An elevator has been added.

In 2015, the historic building was threatened by severe water damage and needed urgent restoration repairs for a cost of approximately $1 million. The building needed cosmetic attention, roof restoration, replastering, replumbing, and new electrical wiring installed. The society began the restoration funded entirely by donations and money raised. In May 2015, twenty of the society's artists participated in a mass portrait painting called “People Painting People,” with several well-known members of the public, including former Victoria Police commissioner Ken Lay, as the artists' subjects. This fundraiser event and multiple others contributed to the money raised for the building restoration. Australian arts and heritage consultant, Tracey Avery advised and reported on paint finishes, new colour schemes and prepared for approval by Heritage Victoria. After approximately five years of renovations and $2.5 million raised by both members and donors, the building restoration was complete.

== Finances ==
The Victorian Artist's Society is a non-for-profit and charitable organisation as of its registration in 2012. Many members of the society council work on a volunteer basis. The Society's president, Eileen Mackley, is the VAS Treasurer.

According to the Australian Charities and Not-for-profits Commission AIS report published 30 July 2020, 9.46% of the total gross income of the Victorian Artists’ Society was from donations and bequests. In the year 2020, over $650,000 of the society's gross income was from donations and bequests, which in large part paid for the completion of the building restoration. Approximately 91.64% of their total expenses is on employee salaries. In 2020, the year of COVID-19, there were no significant changes in the company's activity during the financial year.

== Working artists in Victoria ==
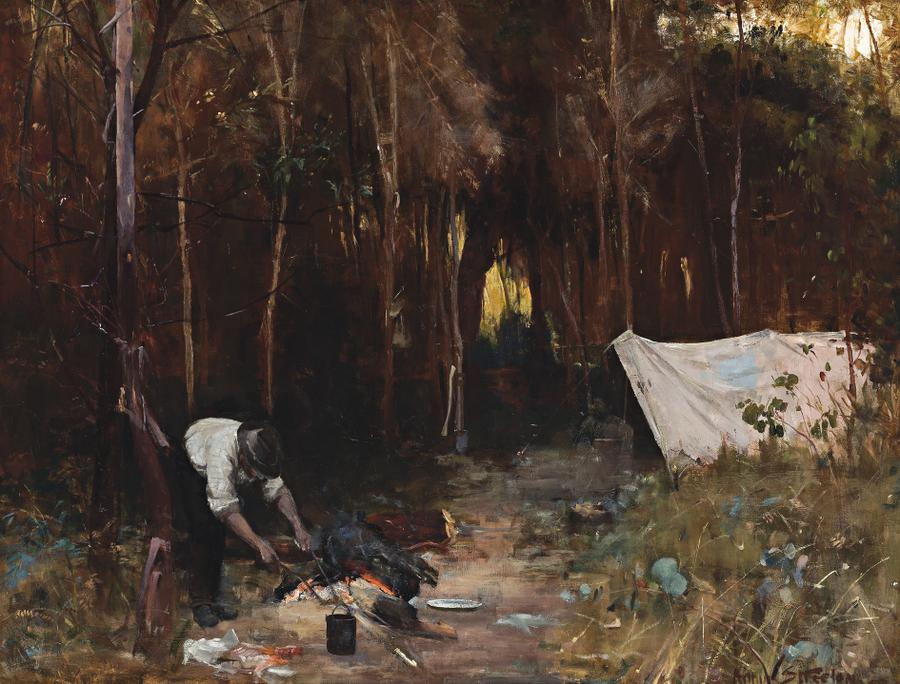
'Settler's Camp' painted by Arthur Streeton, 1888.

After the amalgamation forming the Victorian Artists’ Society in 1888, distinguished artists associated with the Victorian Artists’ Society included Tom Roberts, Charles Conder, and Arthur Streeton. Arthur Ernest Streeton painted ‘Settler’s Camp’ and ‘Pastoral’, both exhibited and sold at the Victorian Artists' Society in 1888. He took inspiration for his portraits from the Yarra River and its bridges. After his time at the Victorian Artists' Society, Streeton worked for the Royal Academy of Arts in London in 1891. Tom Roberts, alongside Streeton a former member of the Artists’ Society has been called the founder of Australian Impressionism. Both artists regularly exhibited oil paintings.

Charles Conder studied at the Art Society School during the 1880s where he exhibited his impressionist painting ‘Departure of the Orient – Circular Quay’ in 1888. Conder sold this painting to the Art Gallery of New South Wales that same year, before leaving to work with Streeton in Melbourne and joining the Victorian Artists’ Society. After joining the Society, he exhibited paintings ‘Coogee Bay’ 1888, and ‘A Holiday at Mentone’ 1888. Conder, along with Roberts, McCubbin, and Streeton became contributors to The 9 by 5 Impressionism Exhibition in August 1889. This exhibition represented impressions of bushlands and city life during a formative period of national Australian history.

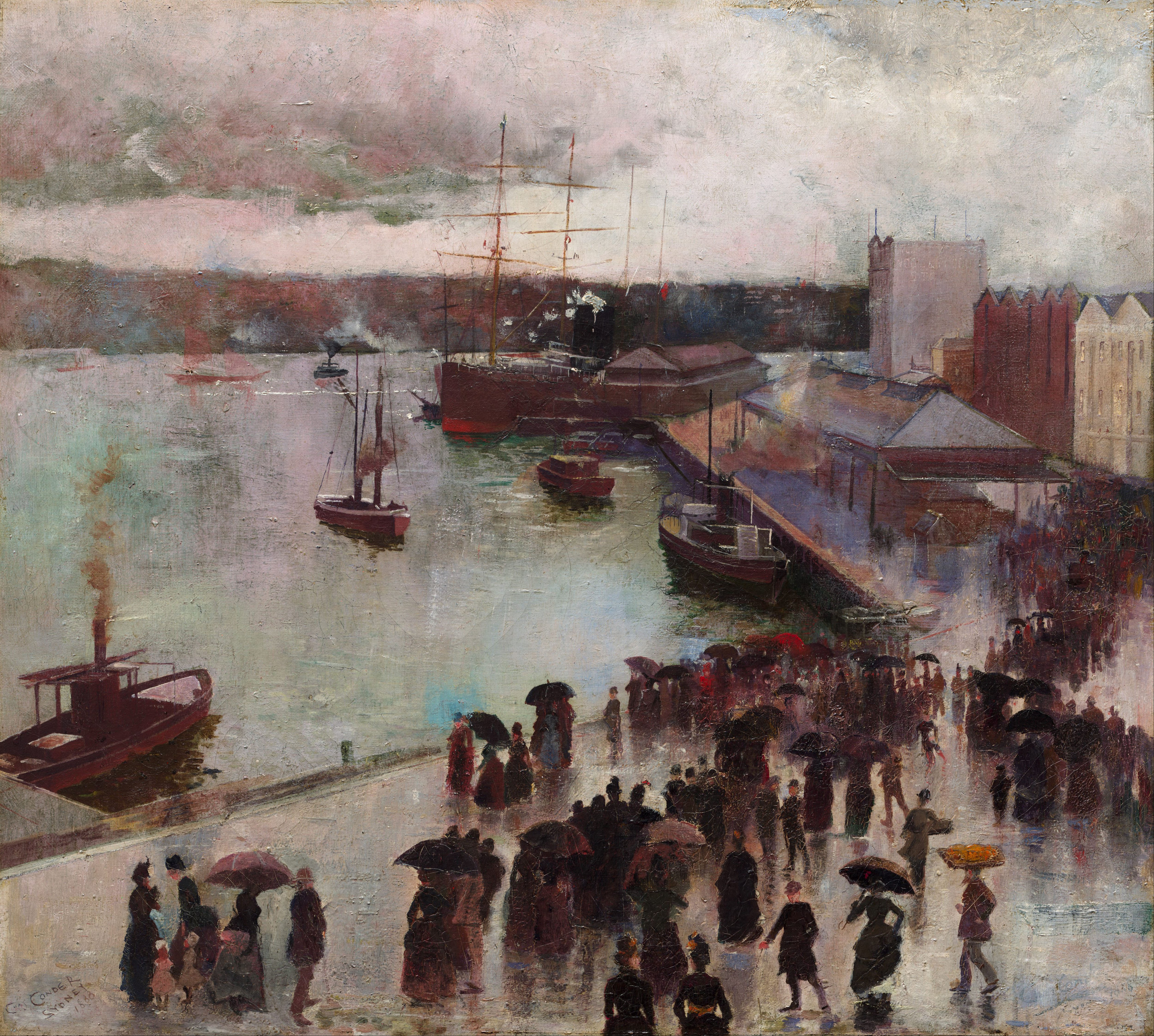
'Departure of the Orient - Circular Quay' by Charles Conder, 1888.

Esther Paterson, born in 1893, was the longest-serving female office bearer of the Victorian Artist's Society. She was also an active member of the Melbourne Society of Women Painters and Sculptors, founded in 1902, and the oldest organisation for women artists in Australia. Many members of the Victorian Artists' Society are also members of the Melbourne Society of Women Painters and Sculptors.

Similar societies to the Victorian Artists’ Society which provide opportunities and exhibitions for working artists in Victoria include Hawthorn Artist Society, Heidelberg Artists Society, and Twenty Melbourne Painters Society.

== Exhibitions and awards ==
The Victorian Artists’ Society holds changing exhibitions throughout the year. In the five galleries, new exhibitions are held every two to three weeks. Exhibitions range from retrospective exhibitions of former VAS members to acrylic landscapes to contemporary works focusing on the raw beauty of nature. The Artists' Society holds eleven awarded exhibitions a year for members including, Mavis Little VAS Artist of the Year Award; The Norma Bull Portraiture Scholarship; The VAS George Hicks Foundation Contemporary Exhibition; VAS Autumn Select Exhibition; VAS Maritime Exhibition; VAS Portrait Exhibition; VAS Spring Select Exhibition; and the VAS Winter Select Exhibition. The Mavis Little Artist of the Year Award is a $10,000 prize and solo exhibition and is sponsored by the Hansen Little Foundation.

The Artist of the Year Award was introduced by Robert Miller in 1973.

In October 2019, the newly renovated Victorian Artists’ Society hosted “FIVE Exhibition” by the FIVE Melbourne Art Group. This exhibition included landscapes, streetscapes, and portrait paintings from Ted Dansey, Mary Hyde, Julian Bruere, John Hunt, and Lucille Tam. This exhibition was free entry.

== Notable members ==
=== Founders (1888) ===
- Joseph Anderson Panton
- Louis Buvelot
- Thomas Clark
- Hubert De Castella

=== Presidents ===
- 2021 Richard Impey
- 2013 Eileen Mackley
- 2011 Gregory R Smith
- 2007 Noel Waite
- 2003 John Hunt
- 1998 Paul McDonald Smith
- 1995 Kathlyn Ballard
- 1991 Arthur William Harding
- 1988 Connie Walker
- 1983 David Roper
- 1980 Dorothy Baker
- 1977 Edward Heffernan
- 1972 Stanley Hammond
- 1964 William Frater
- 1962 Laurence Scott Pendlebury
- 1959 Arnold Shore
- 1951 Malcolm Warner
- 1948 James Quinn
- 1946 Orlando Dutton
- 1937 James Quinn
- 1935 John Rowell
- 1933 Louis McCubbin
- 1931 Paul Montford
- 1926 Charles Douglas Richardson
- 1925 John Longstaff
- 1918 Charles Douglas Richardson
- 1917 Max Meldrum
- 1912 William Montgomery
- 1911 John Mather
- 1910 Frederick Horatio Bruford
- 1909 Frederick McCubbin
- 1906 John Mather
- 1905 Walter Withers
- 1903 Frederick McCubbin
- 1902 John Ford Paterson
- 1893 John Mather
- 1888 Joseph Anderson Panton
- 1875 Chester Earles
- 1870 Oswald Rose Campbell

=== Current Directors ===
- Hylton Mackley
- Meg Davoren Honey
- Ron C Smith
- Radmila Hardi
- Bruce Baldey
- Rosemary Noble
- John Hurle
- Maxine Waine
- Fred Toumayen
- Rachel Robertson
- Sue Ireland
- Jennifer Fyfe
- Richard Impey

=== Distinguished Artists ===
Sources:

- Karl Duldig
- Arthur Streeton
- Tom Roberts
- Charles Conder
- Esther Paterson
- Frederick McCubbin
- Louis Buvelot
