= John Ford Paterson =

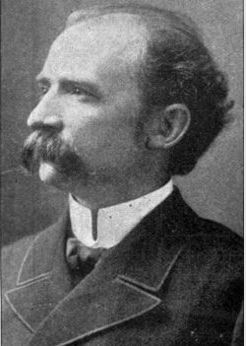
John Ford Paterson

John Ford Paterson (1851, Dundee – 30 June 1912, Carlton), often referred to as Ford or J. Ford Paterson, was a Scottish-born Australian artist. He specialised in landscapes.

== Biography ==
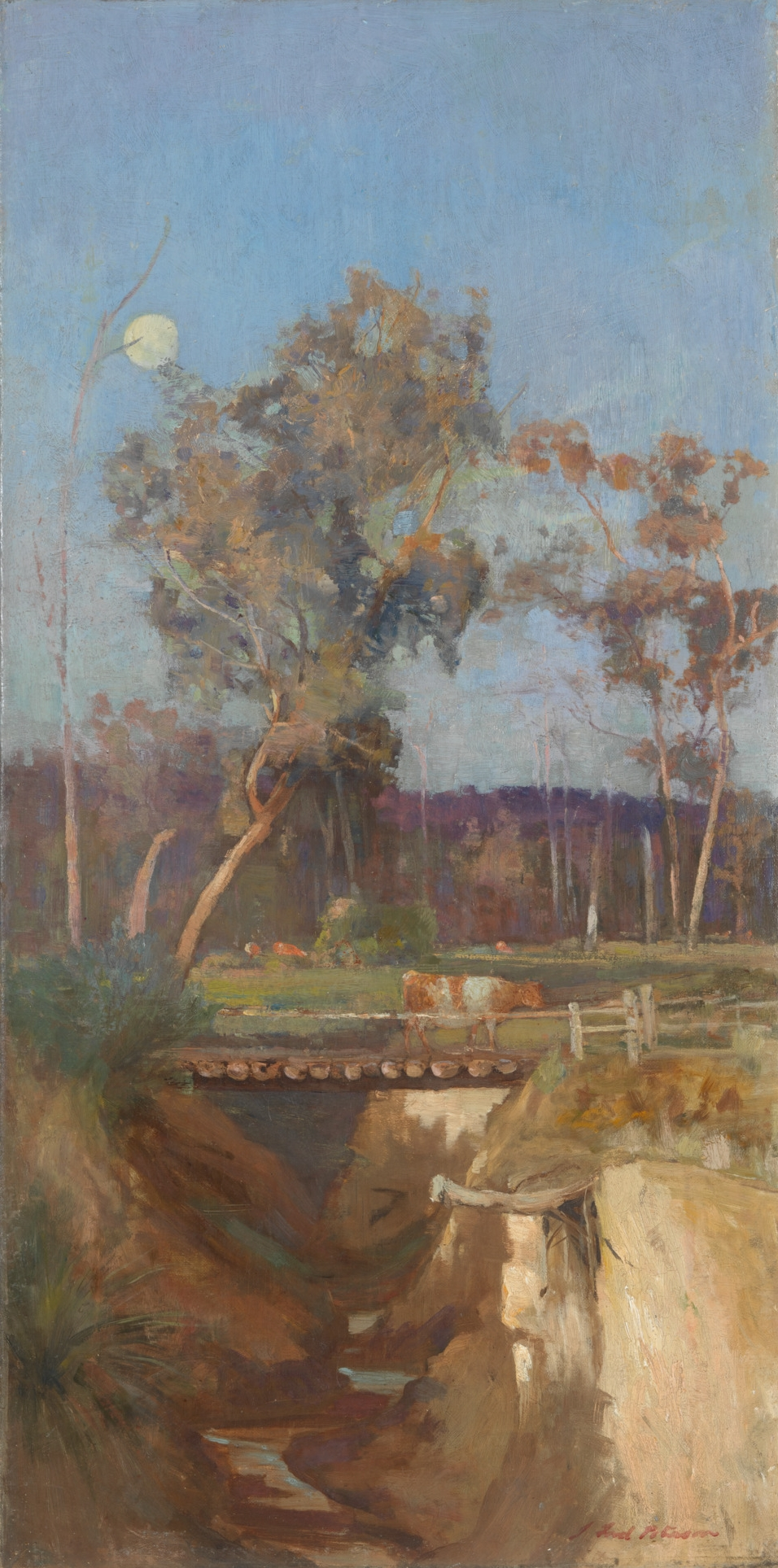
In the Country, c. 1895, National Gallery of Australia

While still a teenager, he began his studies at the Royal Scottish Academy in Edinburgh and exhibited his first works shortly after turning twenty. In 1872, he followed his family to Melbourne, where he remained for three years, but returned to Scotland when he found that the local art instruction did not meet his needs for further development. Once back, he came under the influence of the Glasgow School and held numerous exhibitions, in Liverpool and Manchester as well as throughout Scotland. As his reputation grew, he was able to join the prestigious Savage Club in London.

In 1884, he decided to return to Australia and, except for one short visit home, would remain there for the rest of his life. It was then that he became primarily known as a landscape painter. Paterson renewed his friendship with the Swiss-born landscape painter Louis Buvelot, a major influence on the Heidelberg School, whose en plein air methods suited Paterson. Otherwise, his Romantic style was at odds with the more Impressionistic approach of the Heidelbergers and his exhibitions with the group were only moderately successful. His brother Charles had Grosvenor Chambers built at number 9 Collins Street, Melbourne, in which numbers of the Heidelberg painters had studios, and many artists since, but whether John F. Paterson also worked there is unknown.

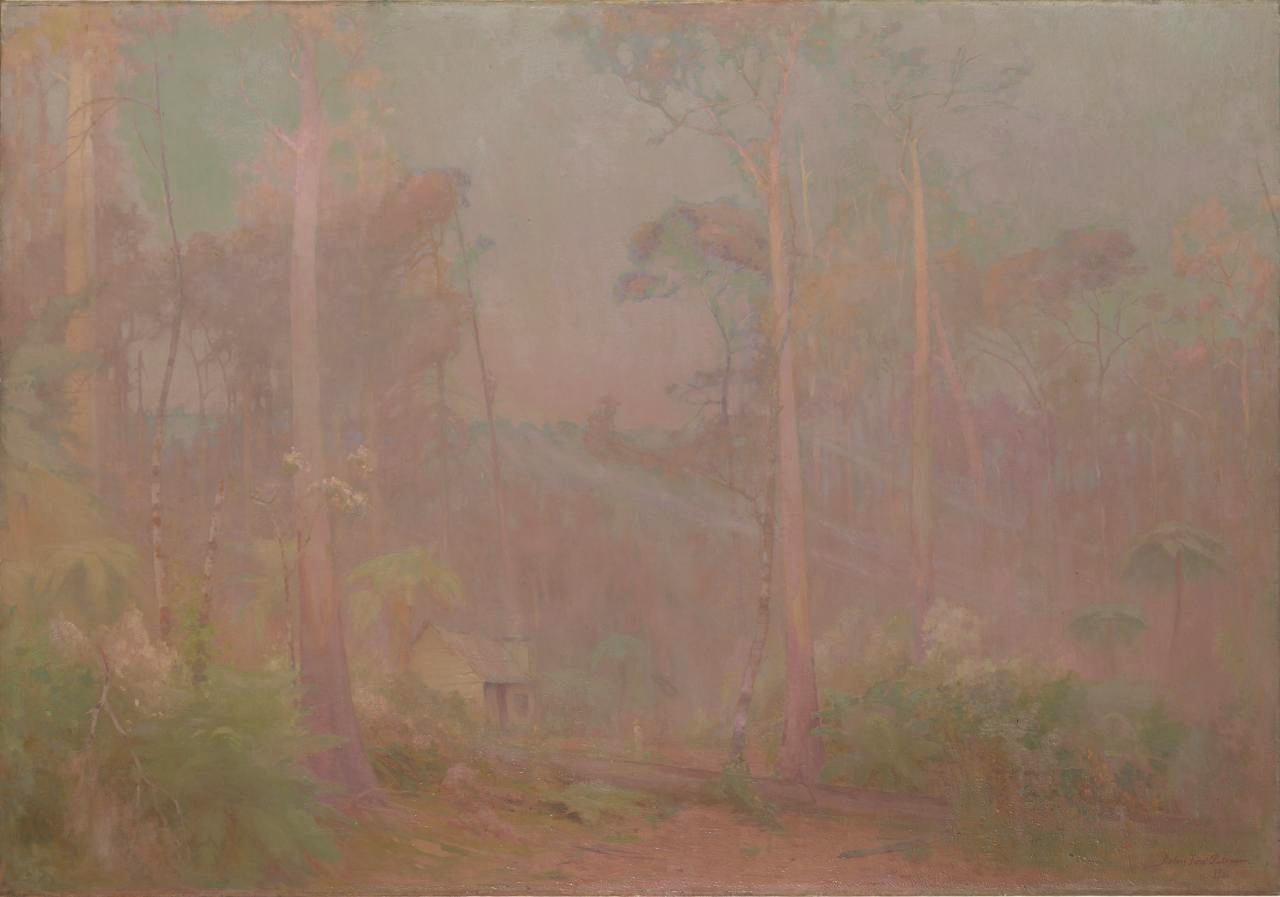
Fernshaw: A Bush Symphony, 1900, National Gallery of Victoria

He joined the Buonarotti Club and its plein air painting camps. Together with several other well-known artists, he broke away from the Victorian Academy of Art to help create the Australian Art Association, which eventually joined with other organizations to become the Victorian Artists Society. In 1902, Paterson became its President.

During economic downturns, he would support himself by poultry farming. Although well-liked and outgoing, he never married and died, suddenly, at home.

His nieces, Esther Paterson and Betty Paterson, were illustrators and cartoonists and his nephew, Louis Esson, was a poet and playwright.
