= Stanley Hammond (sculptor) =

Australian sculptor

Stanley James Hammond (1 August 1913 – 1 February 2000) was an Australian sculptor. He was responsible for some of Australia's most enduring monuments.

== History ==
Hammond was born in Trentham, Victoria He studied art at Daylesford Technical School and the Royal Melbourne Institute of Technology (RMIT) and worked as an assistant to Orlando Dutton between 1930 and 1932, then with Paul Montford 1933 to 1936. In 1935 he entered and won a design competition for a Pioneer Miners' memorial at Stawell, Victoria and turned professional in 1936.

He assisted Paul Montford in his work on the Shrine of Remembrance, Melbourne.

After WWII Hammond worked with George Allen, war artist in WWII, and head of RMIT's sculpture department on the Shrine's development. He worked with Allen on the bluestone Fallen Warrior and a ten-foot (3 m) freestone sculpture for the Russell Street telephone exchange.

He built his home studio in Chadstone Victoria and worked from there until his death in 2000.

== Teaching ==
Hammond served as visiting lecturer at RMIT from 1936 to 1941, when he enlisted with the Army, then from 1945 to 1960.

== Membership and recognition ==
Hammond was a member of the Sculptors' Society of Australia (founded 1948) and its president in 1953 and 1957. He was a member of the Association of Sculptors of Victoria (founded 1971) and its president at some unnamed date.

Hammond was president of the Victorian Artists Society for 5 terms between 1972 and 1977 and was a council member for 38 years. His contributions were honored in 1993 on the occasion of his 80th birthday celebration with the naming on the "Hammond" gallery.

The Stanley Hammond sculpture prize (inaugurated in 1953) was named in his honour.

He was awarded the Queen Elizabeth Coronation Medal in 1952 and the MBE in 1974, awarded for sculpture and services to art.

== Works ==
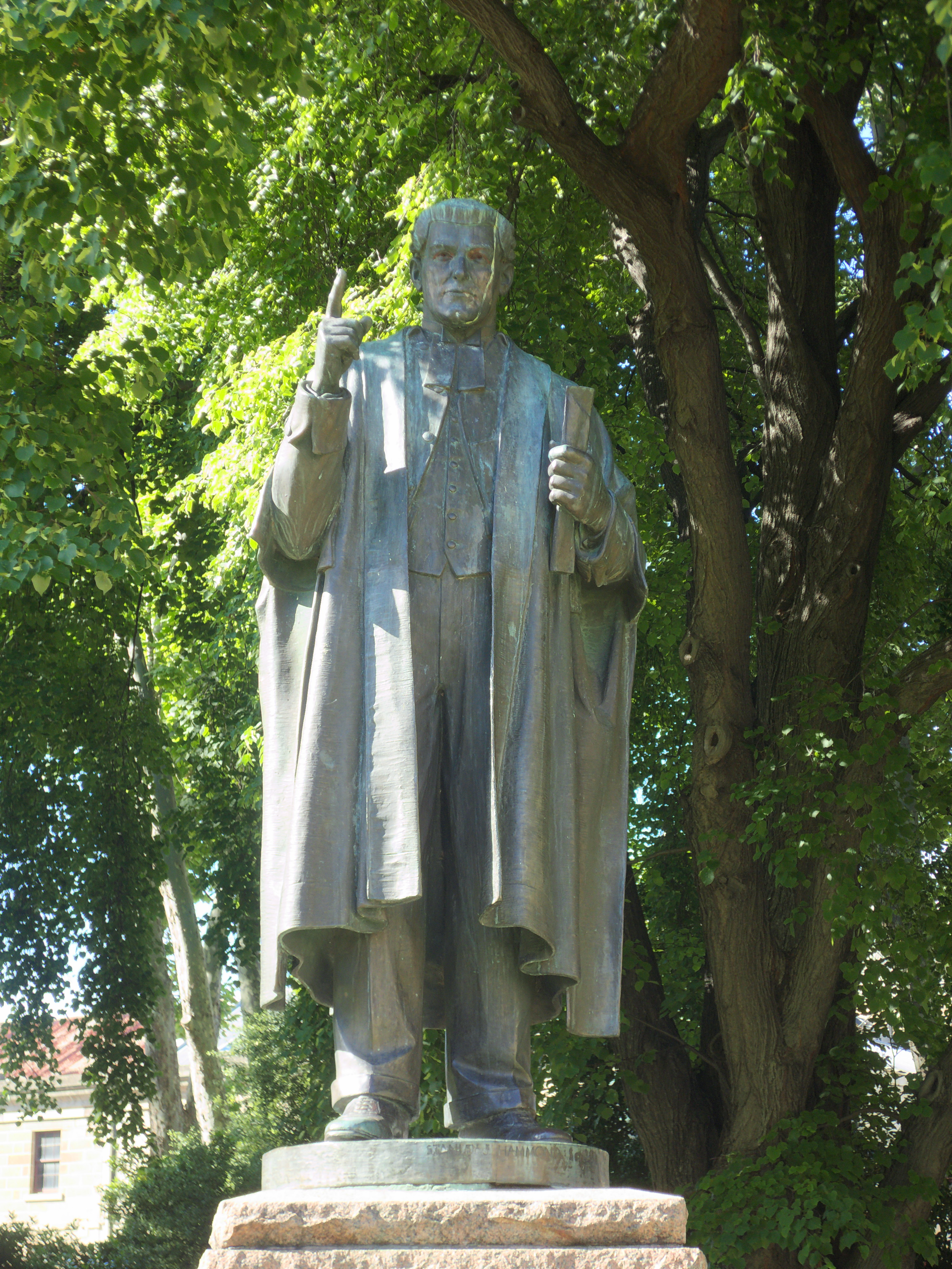
Albert Ogilvie

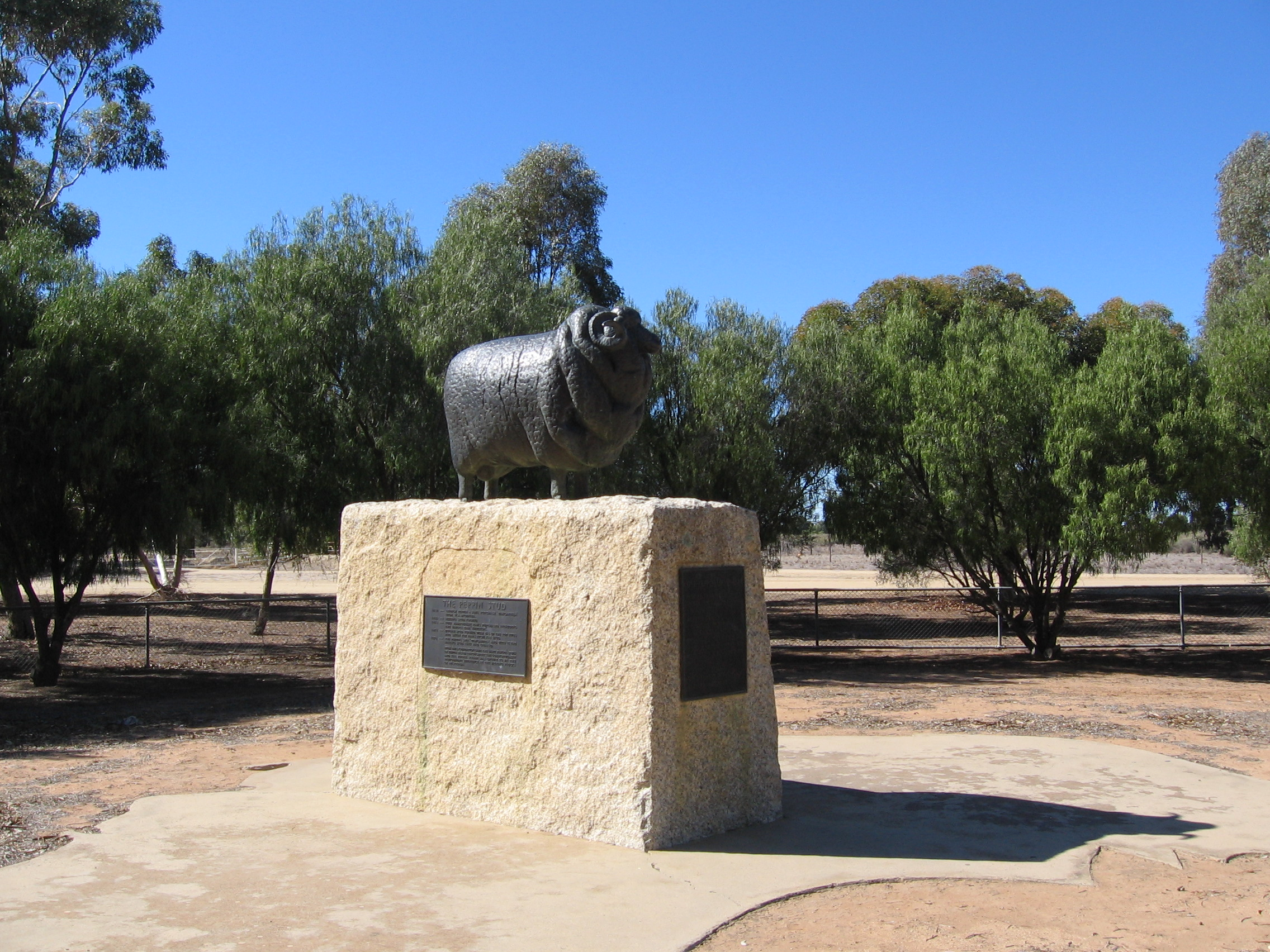
Peppin Merino memorial at Wanganella

- Australian Soldier, for the Australian war memorial at Mont St Quentin, a replacement for the original by Web Gilbert which was destroyed by German troops in 1940.
- Memorial to Donald Macdonald at Black Rock Park, subsequent to his winning a design contest.
- Sundial memorial to Matron E. M. Walker at Fairfield Infectious Diseases Hospital
- Statue of A. G. Ogilvie for Hobart in 1943, to be cast in bronze after the war
- John Batman memorial (1978) erected in Collins Street, Melbourne
- Water Engineering, set of bronze panels for the Metropolitan Water Sewerage and Drainage Board offices, Sydney
- Peppin Merino, a large bronze effigy in Wanganella, New South Wales
- Peace Memorial for the Civic Centre, Broken Hill
- Bust of Lorentzos Mavilis for the town square, Ithaca, Greece
- Sunderland, panel of the Short Sunderland flying boat for Plymouth Hoe, England
- Soldiers of the Great War, series of heads for the Australian War Memorial, Canberra
- Sir Walter Scott bust of the author at the Civic Centre, Ballarat
- Set of four gargoyles cast in aluminium for Sacred Heart Cathedral, Bendigo
- Peace Memorial in local stone, Geelong
- From School cast in bronze, Daylesford

== Family ==
Hammond married Marion Alfreda Kirkland (1915 - 1992) in 1939.

They had a son (James Gilbert 1939) and a daughter (Diana Joy approx. 1943 - 1977).

== Other Interests ==
Hammond was a successful power boat racer, building his own boats "ATOM" and "ATOM 2". Atom was donated to Museums Victoria in 1970 and was on display for many years. It is currently in storage.
