= Orlando Dutton =

Australian sculptor (1894–1962)

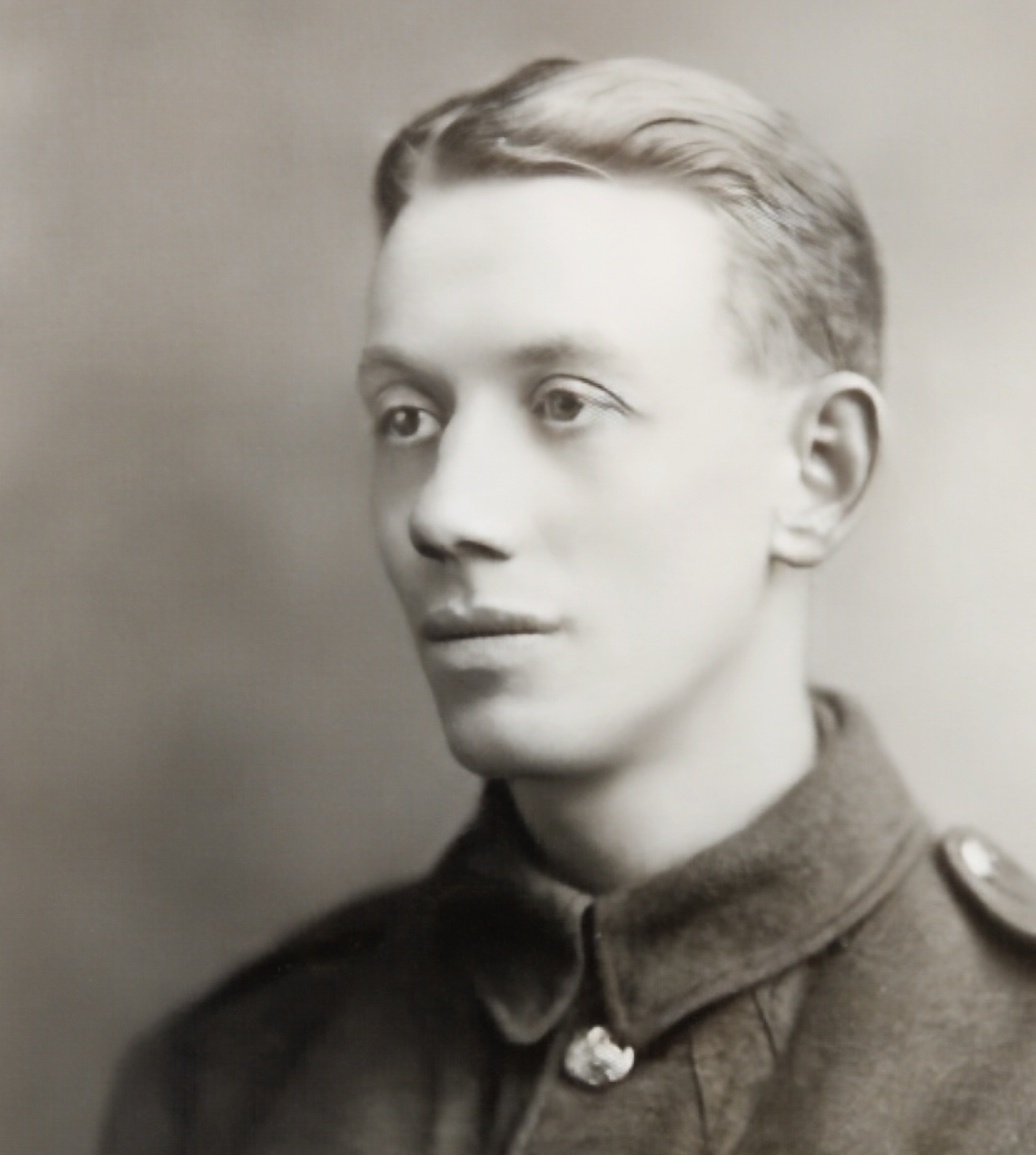
- Orlando Dutton in 1915 (image courtesy Deborah Simpson)
- Born: 1 April 1894; Walsall, United Kingdom
- Died: 17 August 1962 (aged 68); Fairfield, Australia
- Education: School of Art, Walsall. Apprentice to Robert Bridgeman
- Known for: Sculpture, Painting
- Movement: Art Deco
- Spouse: Emma
- Awards: 1938 Melrose Prize

Orlando Henry Dutton (1 April 1894, Walsall – 7 August 1962, Melbourne) was an English-born Australian monumental, figurative and architectural sculptor.

== Early life ==
Orlando Dutton (sometimes styled H. Orlando Dutton, and known as Harry) was born in Upper Rushall Street, Walsall, Staffordshire on 1 April 1894, the first son of Eliza Priscilla (née Leayton) and Henry, a baker, confectioner and proprietor of the Silver Grill in Park Street. Orlando was the third of five siblings Lillian, Dorothy, Sydney, and Montague, and was a chorister in the town's St. Matthew's Church.

== Training ==
Dutton began his education at the Blue Coat school in St. Paul's Street, and then attended the School of Art at 22 Goodall Street, Walsall (now Luvane Fine Art gallery) and in 1909 was apprenticed to Robert Bridgeman's Lichfield firm of ecclesiastical sculptors. As a stone carver, he was employed on buildings in the Midlands, such as, in 1910, the girls' high school building in Handsworth.

== War service in WW1 ==
During World War I, he enlisted on 23 October 1915 and served in the United Kingdom with the Manchester Regiment in the Labour Corps, and was awarded the 1914-1915 Star He then was assigned to the 29th Trench Mortar Battery with the Salonica Force fighting in Valletta, Malta. Orlando's father inquired after his location and condition in March 1918 by cable from his home at 265 Gillies St., Adelaide and received a reply in July that year reporting that since 16 May 1918 his son was being treated for malaria in the 4th London General Hospital, Denmark Hill (King's College Hospital). Orlando's brother Sydney died fighting in France on 8 August 1918, aged 22.

== Australia ==
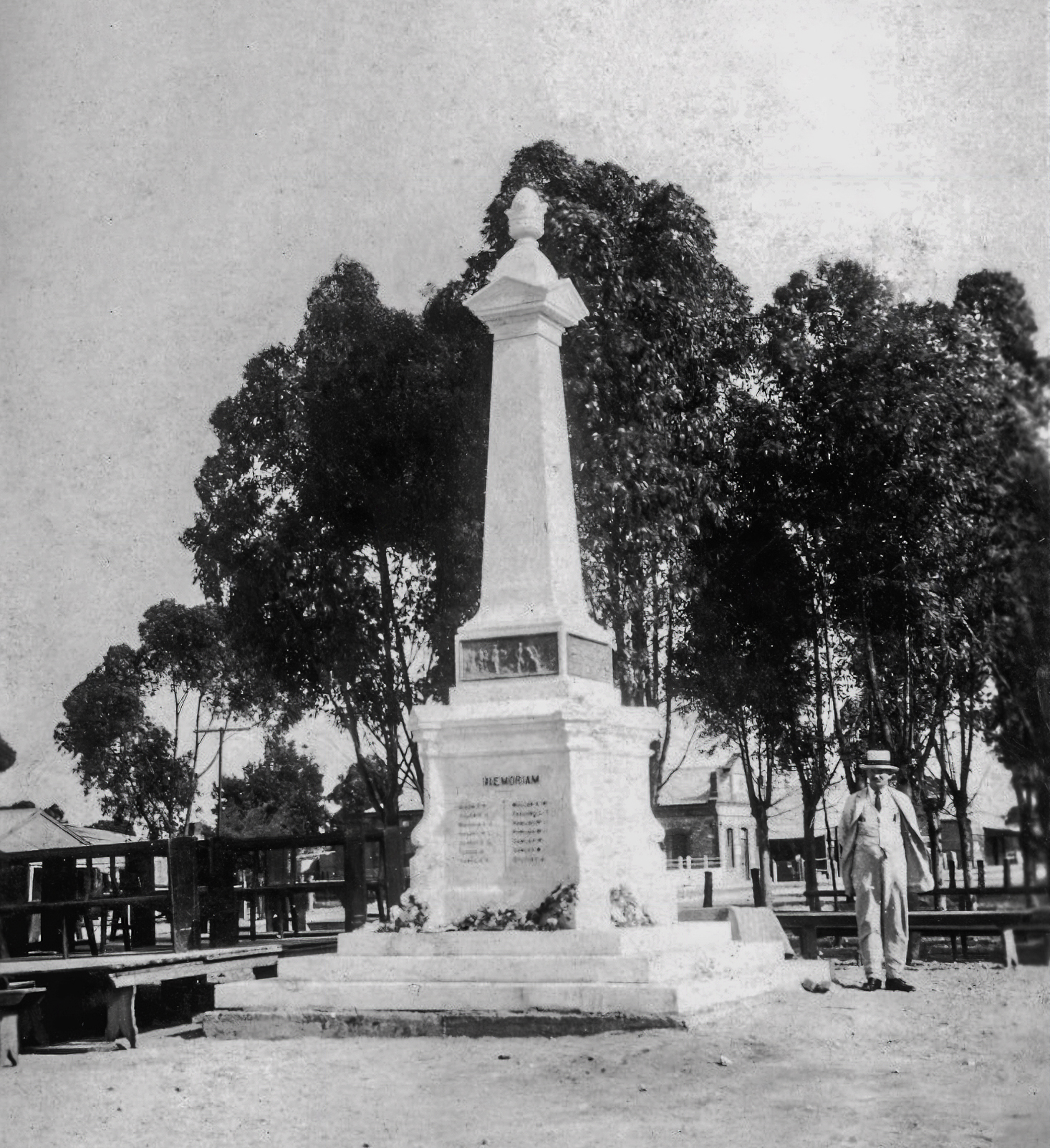
Orlando Dutton (1922) four bronze bas-reliefs, Soldiers' Memorial, Booleroo Centre, South Australia

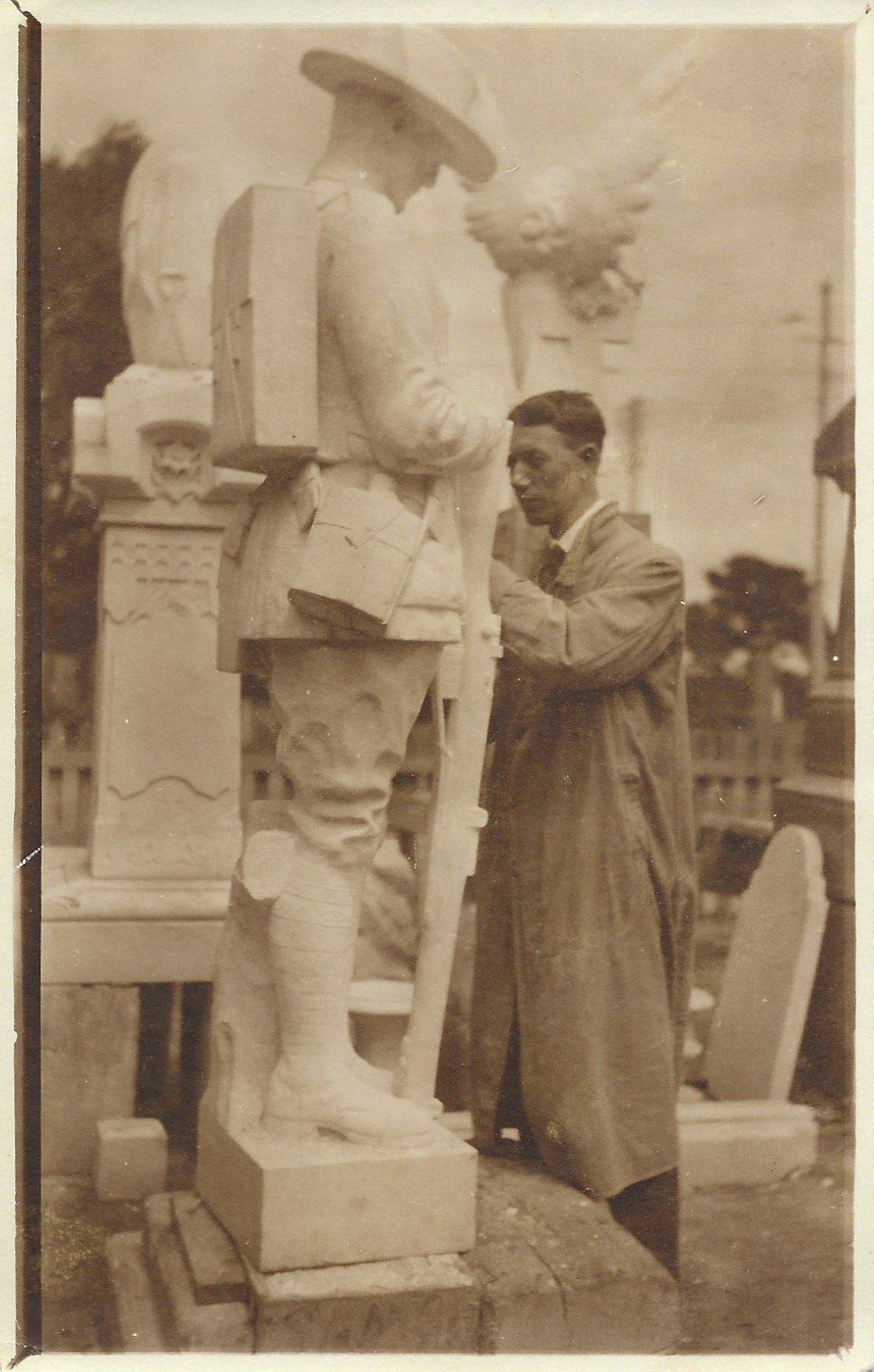
Orlando Dutton working on the Kapunda & District Fallen Soldiers Monument, c1920-23. Image courtesy of Deborah Simpson

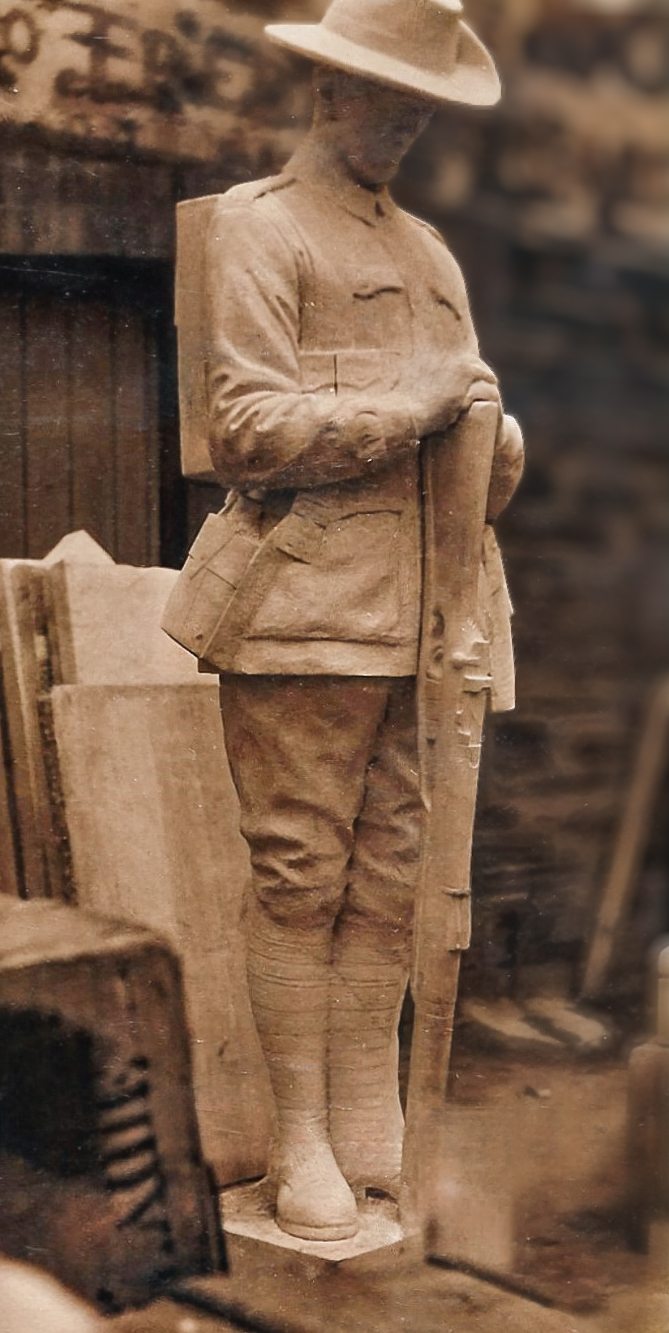
Orlando Dutton (1922) Kapunda & District Fallen Soldiers Monument, c1920-23. Image courtesy of Deborah Simpson

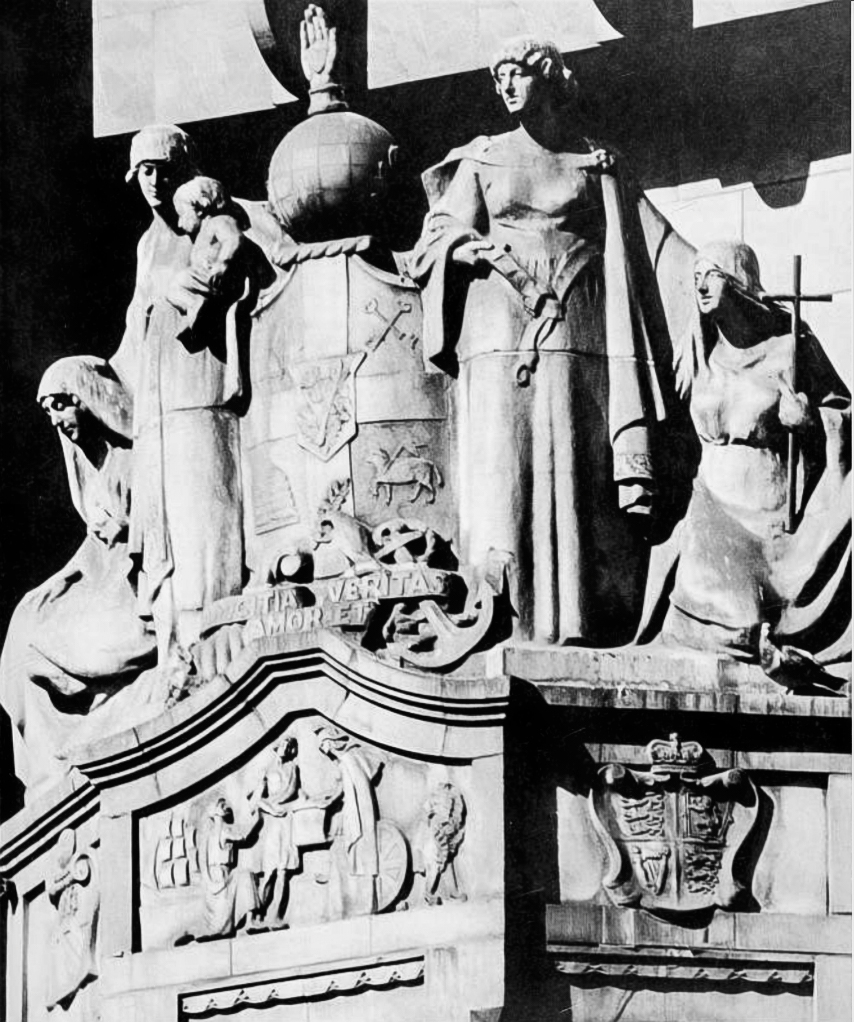
Orlando Dutton (1930-31) Statuary groups Faith, Hope and Charity, for the Manchester Unity building, Melbourne on both the Collins Street and Swanston Street facades, close to the corner entrance

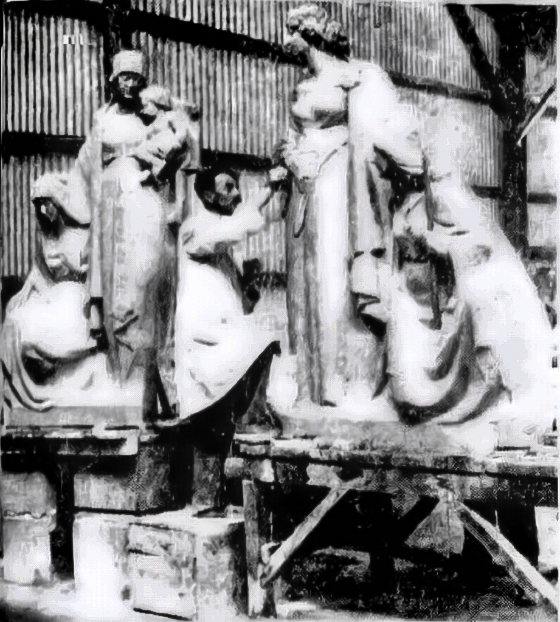
Herald newspaper photo of Dutton working in 1932 on models for the Manchester Unity Building groups

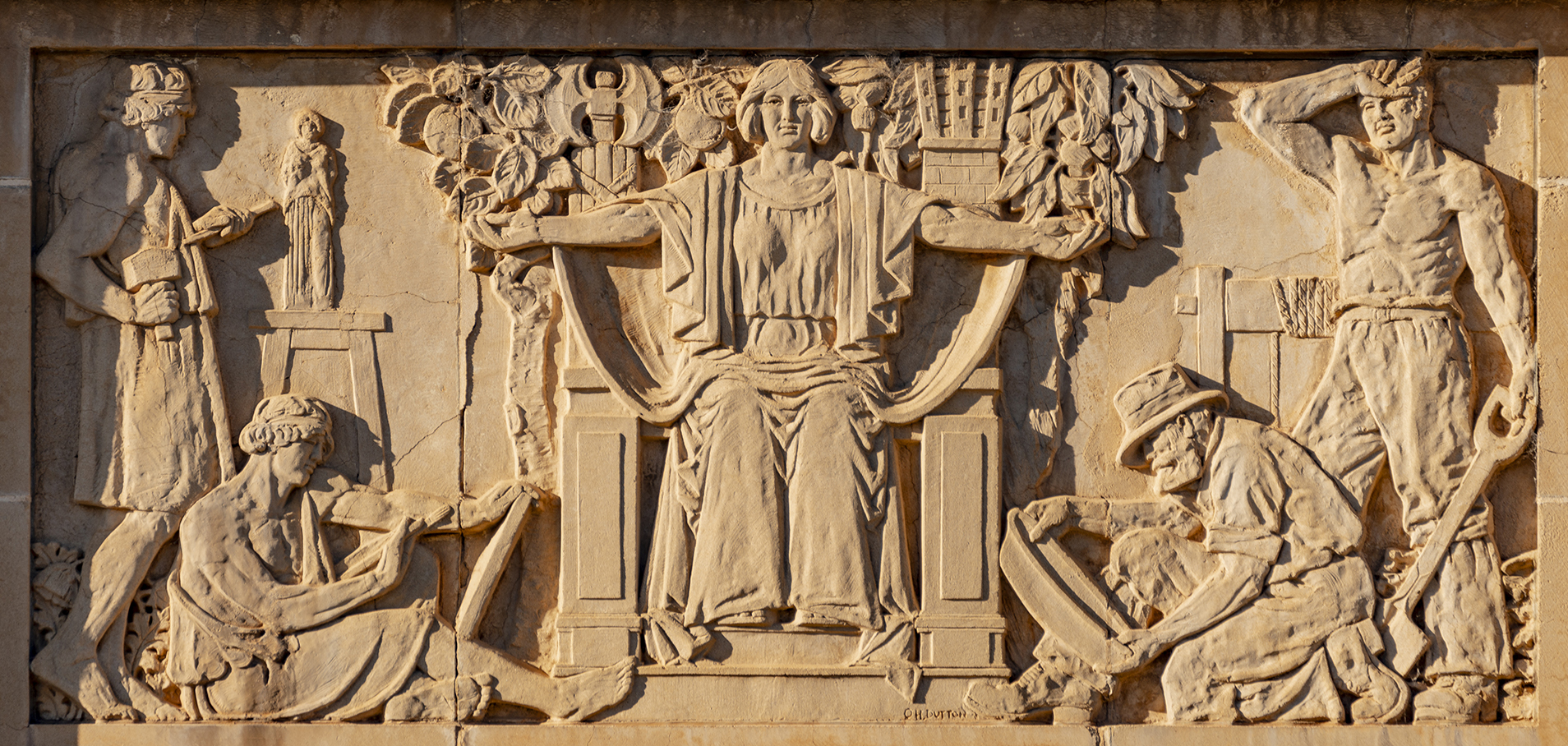
Orlando Dutton (1930-31) Bas-relief panel, facade of Castlemaine Art Museum. Cast artificial stone.

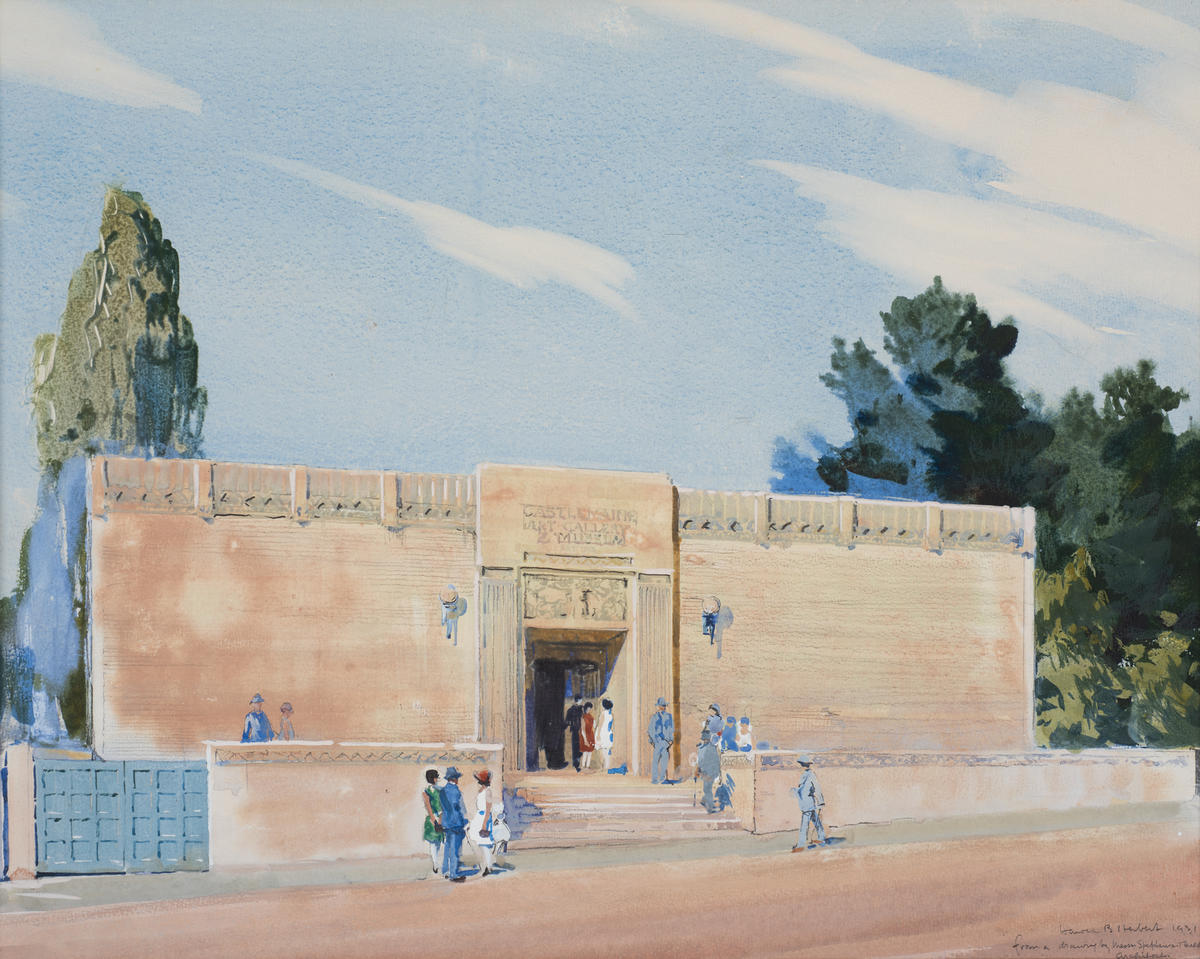
Castlemaine Art Gallery and Museum Harold Herbert 1931 Watercolour 41.3 x 52.7 cm Inscribed l.r., watercolour "from a drawing by Messrs. Stephenson & Meldrum architects." Showing Dutton panel above door.

Other members of Dutton's family migrated to Australia in 1913 while he stayed to complete his apprenticeship. Still suffering from malaria and other ailments acquired during his war service, he emigrated to Australia on a free passage as an ex-Serviceman under an overseas settlement scheme, with £25 gratuity. On the voyage he met Emma Jane Hancock, a former wartime V.A.D. nurse (born 6 March 1880), and they married on 15 August 1922 in Adelaide. Living first in Adelaide near his family, he entered a partnership with a monumental mason. In 1922 he made four bronze reliefs based on his own war experiences for a WWI monument in Booleroo Centre. In 1923 he exhibited at the Royal South Australian Society of Arts.

The couple made Melbourne their permanent home, living at first at 13 Devonshire Road, East Malvern, and there, from 1929 he worked as a stonemason on the Shrine of Remembrance and also that year made four figures for the tower of St Paul's Cathedral, Melbourne.

== Depression years ==
The Great Depression, especially harsh in Australia, resulted in there being few art lovers buying, or even showing interest in, sculpture with even the most professional failing to sell a single work. Their medium was always last to be mentioned in reviews of exhibitions, and sculptors struggled to survive. Nevertheless, the depth of the global economic crisis proved to be a busy time for Dutton, with work on buildings of two insurance companies and an art gallery.

In 1930–31, with the assistance of 17-year-old Stanley Hammond, he cast two identical groups of large figures of Faith, Hope and Charity, for placement six stories above the Collins and Swanston Streets entrances of the Art Deco Manchester Unity building. An uncredited article in The Herald describes the technical approach;

Statuary groups— Faith, Hope and Charity will be a feature of the new Manchester Unity building. This emblematical statuary will appear on both the Collins Street and Swanston Street facades, close to the corner entrance, and, being in ivory white, will stand out well against the mother-of-pearl glazed terra-cotta. Much work is involved in the completion of such a group of life-size figures. First a quarter scale model is completely finished in clay, and after approval of detail has been given by the architect, the figures are modelled full-size in special modelling clay. Since the figures cannot be handled full-size in the kilns, and on account of the necessity of reproducing two or three sets, they are carefully cut into convenient sizes, from which plaster moulds are made. The individual pieces are then pressed in clay, dried, glazed, and burnt in the kiln to 2100 deg. Fahrenheit, after which they are closely fitted together, and are ready for setting in place on the job. The modelling, to the design of the architect, Mr Marcus R. Barlow, is being done at Wunderlich's terra-cotta factory, Sunshine, by Mr O. H. Dutton, sculptor, who carried out a considerable amount of work for the Shrine of Remembrance.

In the same years, for the main entrance of the AMP building at 419-429 Collins Street and 64-74 Market Street Melbourne, he carved the emblematic statuary group from three blocks of stone weighing more than 17 tonnes, and he and Hammond cast in artificial stone an allegorical panel over the entrance of architect Percy Meldrum's Art Deco Castlemaine Art Gallery and Historical Museum, for which Harold Herbert, who made a watercolour of the building, had praise in his 1930 article describing the techniques employed;

A very interesting panel, in relief, to be placed over the entrance doorway to the Castlemaine Art Gallery has been completed by Mr. O. H. Dutton. It is excellently designed, and the flat relief of 14 inches depth has been very effectively carried out. The panel is about eight feet long. The process, too, is interesting, as the work is to be cast in artificial stone (a mixture of crushed stone and cement) of a yellow-grey colour. The design is symbolic in character, and expresses civic pride by the seated central figure with the arts and culture on one side and the goldmining, which was responsible for the birth of Castlemaine, on the other. Appropriate also is the suggestion of cultivation and progress. This panel, which will be the sole item of decoration included in a very simple and dignified facade, will prove a very telling note, and has been admirably conceived for this purpose. The architects are Messrs. Stephenson and Meldrum, of Melbourne.

== Sculptors’ Society of Australia ==
In 1932 W. Leslie Bowles met with Dutton, Wallace Anderson, Ola Cohn, George Allen and Charles Oliver, proposing to form a Sculptors' Society in the hope that commissions could be shared amongst the Society members. The Sculptors' Society of Australia was duly instituted with Bowles, as Secretary, its only office bearer in a position he held through the life of the Society. Sydney sculptors Paul Montford and Raynor Hoff and Daphne Mayo of Brisbane joined the Society and later the younger professional sculptors, Lyndon Dadswell and Stanley Hammond, also became members. In its next ten years until its demise because of the War, the Society promoted seven competitions for major public sculptures, of which Bowles won four, Hammond two and Anderson one; while none of the other members were successful.

In April 1933 the first group exhibition of sculpture to be held in Melbourne was organised by members Dutton, Bowles, Wallace Anderson, Ola Cohn, George Allen, and Charles Oliver. Arthur Streeton enthusiastically welcomed the exhibition and expressed surprise that Australia, which had a clear atmosphere and a suitable climate to show sculpture to its best advantage, did not make more of it. An illustration of Dutton's plaster maquette of St. George from the show was published in Art in Australia in December that year. After joining the Victorian Artists Society, his Troubadour was exhibited at their galleries in East Melbourne in May 1935.

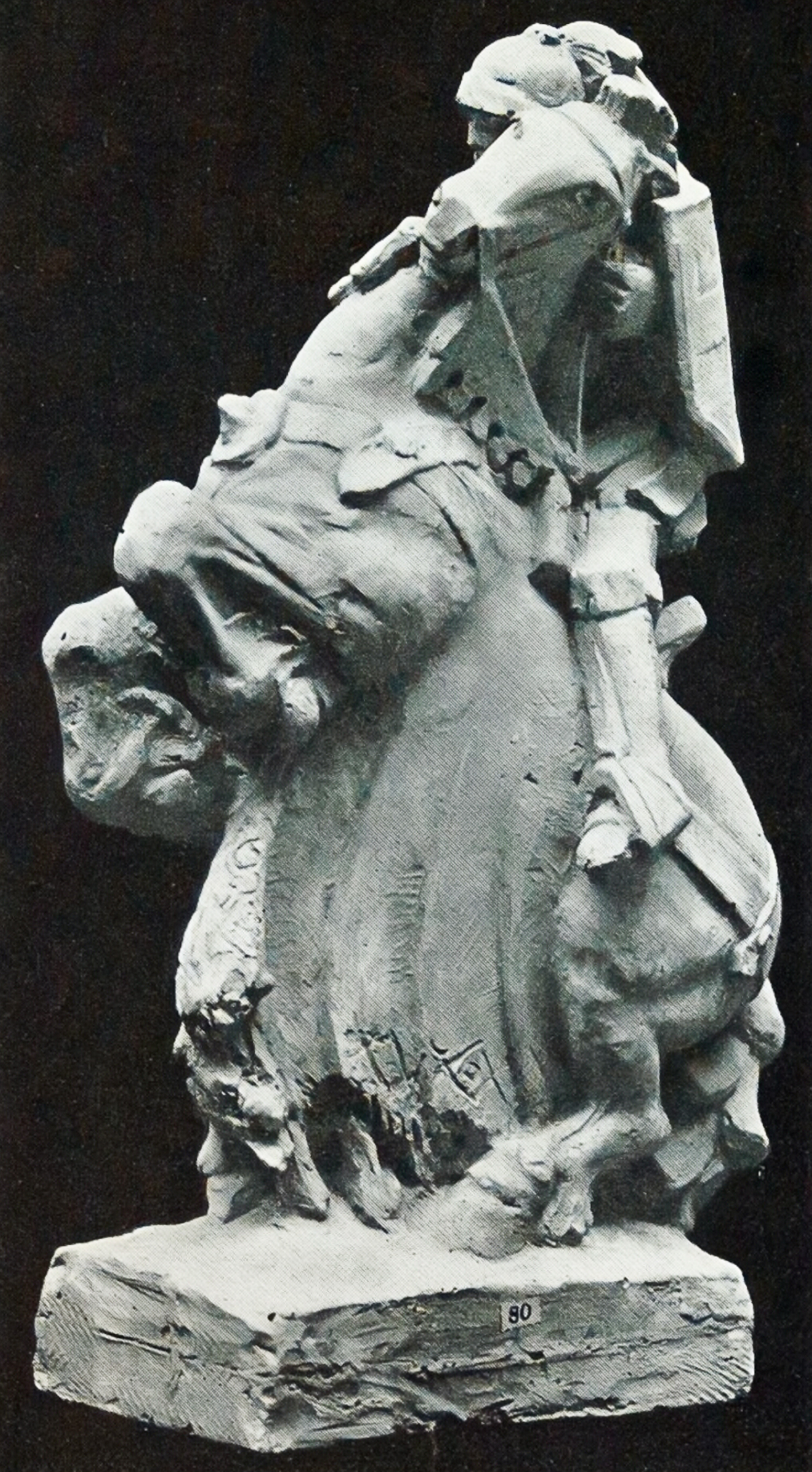
Orlando Dutton (1933) St. George. Plaster sketch for stone, from the first group exhibition of sculpture to be held in Melbourne

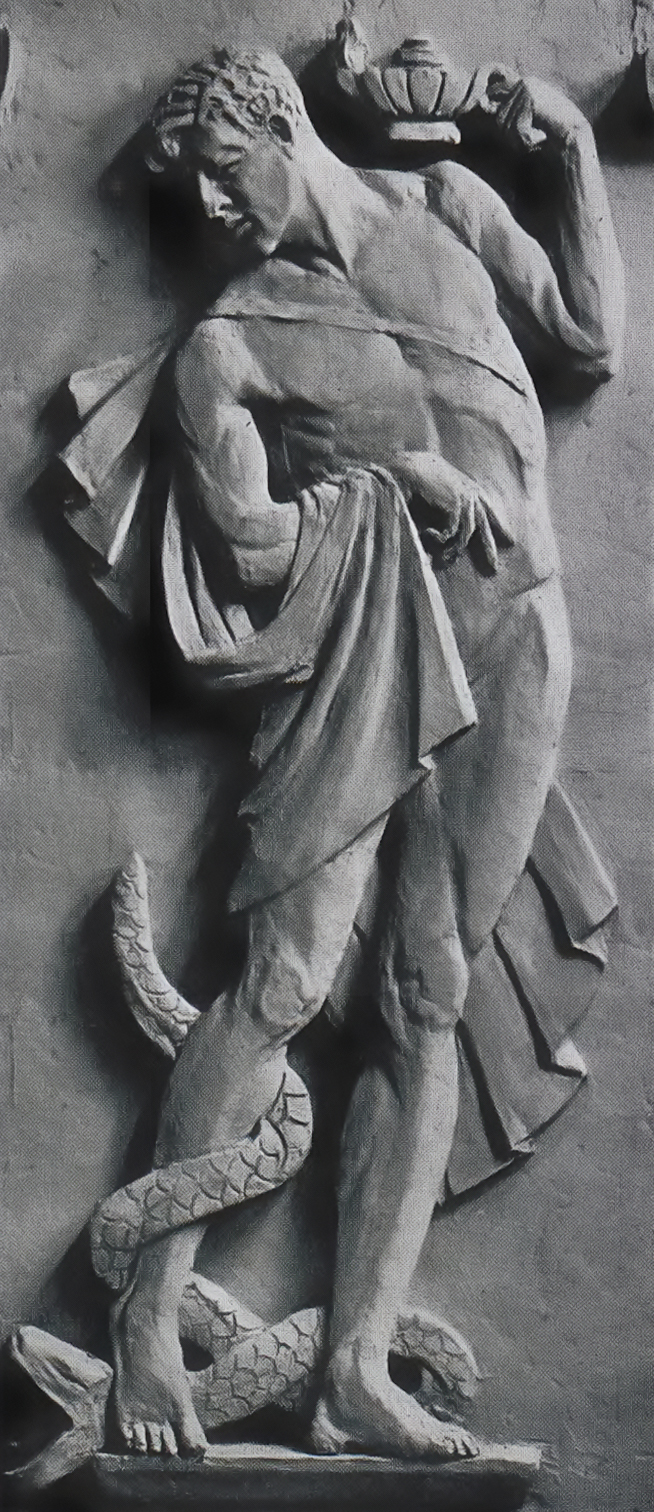
Photograph of 1938 Orlando Dutton relief sculpture, front elevation, Anzac House, Collins Street, Melbourne

Like others in the Society, Dutton was active from the mid-1930s in entering sculpture awards. He submitted for the Melbourne City Council competition for sculpture to decorate the Fitzroy Gardens, which was won by Leslie Bowles. In December 1935 Dutton submitted for the (Sir John) Monash Equestrian Memorial commission a finished maquette as one of the competitors, with Paul Montford, Lyndon Dadswell, Raynor Hoff, Wallace Anderson, Henry Harvey and A. de Bono, whose entries apart from that of winner, who again was Bowles, were exhibited in Melbourne at the new Arts and Crafts Society gallery.

Dutton's architectural decoration continued in 1938 with his contribution of a symbolic bas-relief to the facade of Anzac House in Collins Street of a man holding high the Lamp of Honour while crushing the Serpent of Evil with his heel. That year in Adelaide, he received the Melrose Prize for a portrait bust of writer Robert H. Croll and the Art Gallery of South Australia, belatedly strengthening its sculpture collection, was the first to acquire Dutton's work, purchasing his stone carving Jeune Fille from the 1939 South Australian Society of Arts spring show through the Morgan Thomas Bequest Fund.

== World War II ==
During World War II Dutton again served, enlisting at Caulfield in the 2nd AIF with the service number VX22013, and as an older recruit in his late forties his skills were employed in the Mapping Division making landscape models for training purposes. Over 1941–42 he worked on Professor Edwin Sherbon Hills' large scale map of the Australian topography nine metres (thirty feet) square, at a scale of 5.2 km to the centimetre. It was made in plaster over plywood cut to follow fifty-foot (15.24 m.) contour intervals, and Dutton finished the final model with a scalpel before its casting in sections. The full map was displayed for the 1967 ANZAAS conference. Since the late 1970s a section showing eastern Australian states has been displayed in the School of Earth Sciences' Fritz Loewe Theatre, Melbourne University on the corner of Swanston and Elgin Streets, Carlton. Scienceworks retains the Commonwealth archives copy.

The War did not curtail Dutton's artistic practice and in 1939, though not yet a member of the conservative Australian Academy of Art, he showed a limestone carving Night, and a small sculpture of an aboriginal fisherman, in the Academy's second exhibition then participated in its third in 1940. That year he carved figures in the spandrels above the entrance of the monastery St. Paschal's House of Studies in Box Hill. Harley Cameron Griffiths (Sen.) painted his portrait in 1941 in an army greatcoat. Just before, and after, the War he resided in and kept his studio at 29 Muir St., Hawthorn.

Dutton exhibited with the Victorian Artists' Society from 1934, and as a member in 1939 he was a judge for an Age newspaper sculpture competition. Made its president in 1946–47, he encouraged sculptors to join and founded a sculpture group, inaugurating in 1947 an annual exhibition of the medium at the VAS in the first of which he included a life-sized Orpheus.

Lenton Parr remarks that it was the membership of the professional artists of high standing, James Quinn, George Bell and Orlando Dutton which lent the VAS credibility when amateurs dominated during the rise of the Contemporary Art Society, and when roundly criticised by The Age art critic for its drop in standards on the eve of Dutton's presidency.

Later, he and the other sculptors concerned set up their own society, asking George Allen, Head of the Sculpture School at RMIT and Stanley Hammond to write into its constitution aims including; promoting sculpture in the community; conducting competitions for professional sculptors; and encouraging young sculptors and students with opportunities to exhibit, and to learn by association with practising sculptors. Accordingly the Victorian Sculptors’ Society was founded in 1949 and it achieved its objectives until the departure in 1967 of splinter group the Centre 5.

In other official capacities Dutton on 25 May 1948 opened an exhibition of Bebe Rigg stained-glass windows and cartoons at the Independent Church Hall, Collins Street. With Daryl Lindsay and Louis McCubbin he judged the 1951 Jubilee art competition in Brisbane.

== On sculpture ==
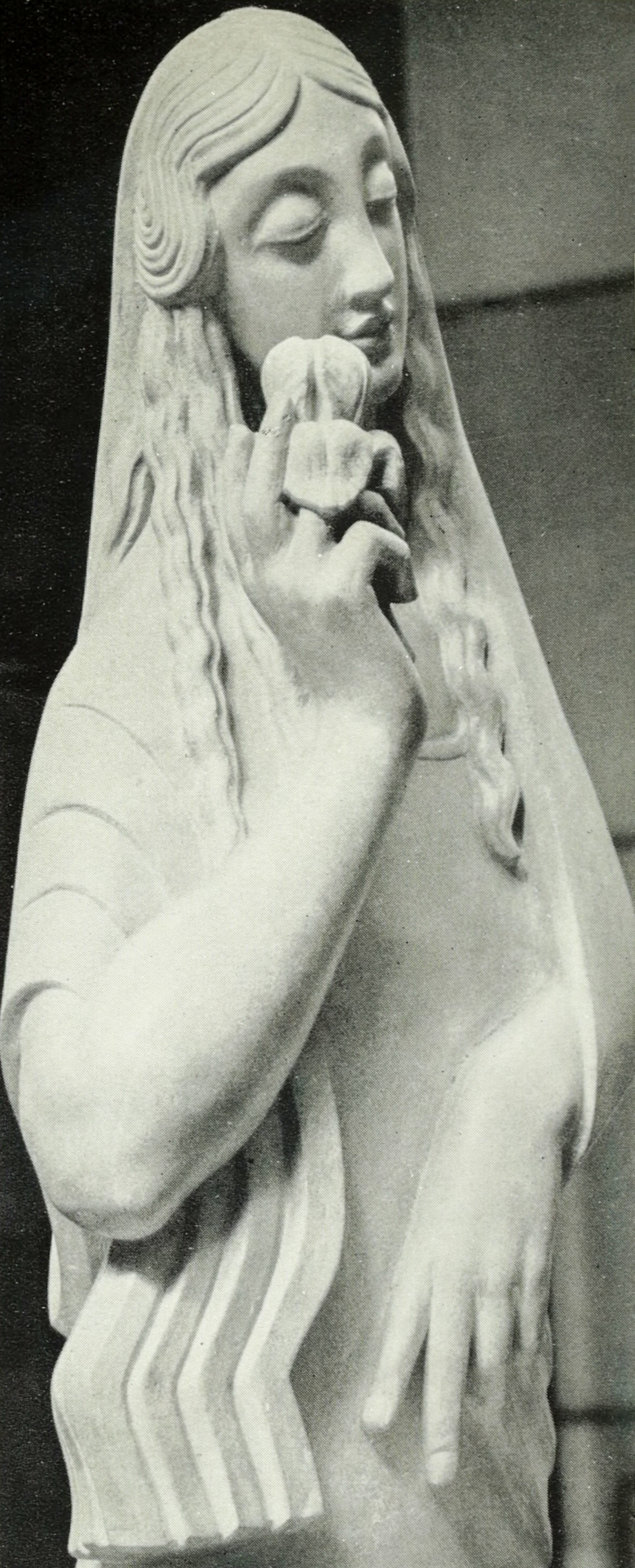
Orlando Dutton (c.1935) Iris, limestone sculpture 66.3 × 35.7 × 21.8 cm (overall). National Gallery of Victoria, Melbourne. Purchased, 1954

Well versed in, and habitually applying, allegory in his art, at the August 1935 meeting of the Victorian Institute of Architects Students Society, Dutton described the preparation of scale models and sculpting techniques in the execution of large stone carvings with reference to his work on the spire of St. Paul's Cathedral. In outlining evolving symbolism in the medium from Egypt and Assyria, and its diversity of forms brought about by Christian adaptations, he criticised “the great lack of sculptural significance in the decoration of most Melbourne buildings,” arousing discussion with his audience about the modern application of sculpture to architectural design.

Asked in 1935 to comment by The Herald on Jacob Epstein's sculpture Behold the Man, Dutton, described as "noted ecclesiastical sculptor" gave a less reactionary, but still ambivalent, response than the others including Paul Montfort who called it "a bit of bunkum", saying; "There are two aspects in which to look at the work. One is the literary. If it were not called Christ, but The Captive, or something like that, nobody would, bother about it. As a piece of sculpture, looking at its humps and bumps and hollows I find it very dull. I believe Epstein has done it on a large scale so that it cannot be carried around the country on tour, as happened to his Genesis."

In 1936 his presentation on ABC radio station 3AR, was titled 'A Sculptor at Work' as part of a series 'An Australian Period' devised by R.H. Croll, whose portrait bust by Dutton was awarded the Melrose Prize in 1938.

Promoting of Dutton's cause while he held presidency of the Victorian Artists Society, and decrying the "Neglect of Sculpture", an article with that heading opened with a paragraph signed "'The Age' Art Critic", asserting that it was the;

least appreciated of all arts. In fourteen years, sales from exhibitions in Melbourne have amounted to less than £100 a year, and, although recent exhibitions stimulated interest, they were not very successful financially. It is evident that, for the time being, survival of this art form depends on the courage and spontaneous love of a few, who, without hope of reward, must carry on in unwarranted obscurity.

The article mentions Arthur Fleischmann and Lyndon Dadswell, but is illustrated only with Dutton's The Torch Bearer and Iris (purchased in 1954 by the NGV), and quotes him as attributing the problem to "the Impact of Impressionism" as "detrimental to appreciation of sculptural form" and calling for a "return to formal relationships, composition and design," as seen in the then current painting, to "contribute to a readier understanding of these qualities in stone. These quatitles are an essential postulate of good sculpture, and their acceptance will lead to a return to the strength of lineal relationships and masses o! form.

In the 1950s Dutton continued to express his strong opinions about public sculpture.

== Reception ==
The Bulletin remarked in its review of the May 1933 Melbourne Fine Arts gallery show of sculpture, the first to be held in the city, that;

Rodin, the greatest of modern sculptors, summed up sculpture as 'the art of the hole and the lump.' Orlando Dutton comes nearest to realising Rodin’s dictum. His “A V.A.D.” and the pleasing “Head of a Girl” may be a trifle too highly finished, but they definitely suggest that he had human beings in front of him instead of a set of rules and regulations.

In reviewing the 1938 Victorian Artists’ Society's Show of 206 works the same magazine commented that "Orlando Dutton’s bust of his mother is limpid, alive." Of his contribution to the 1938 spring exhibition of the Victorian Artists Society, The Age recommends that "among the sculpture exhibits attention is drawn to a model for garden ornament by Orlando Dutton which is original in design and sound." and of the 1940 spring show at the same venue remarks that in "a sculptured head of Harley Griffiths, the artist, Orlando Dutton, has been happy in catching the illusive [sic] smile of his sitter."

In the sculpture section of the fifth Australian Academy of Art exhibition held 20–31 July 1943, The Age, beside Bowles' work "of a more stylised type," rated Dutton's portrait of Dr. Austin Edwards as "probably the best. It has admirable qualities of portraiture and modelling." It was a work shown also in 1946 and again praised by The Age critic who identified it as "the chief work In the exhibition...very ably and sensitively modelled from all profiles: has full "content": and conveys to one who has no acquaintance with the original the feeling that It is a very true likeness."

== Later life ==
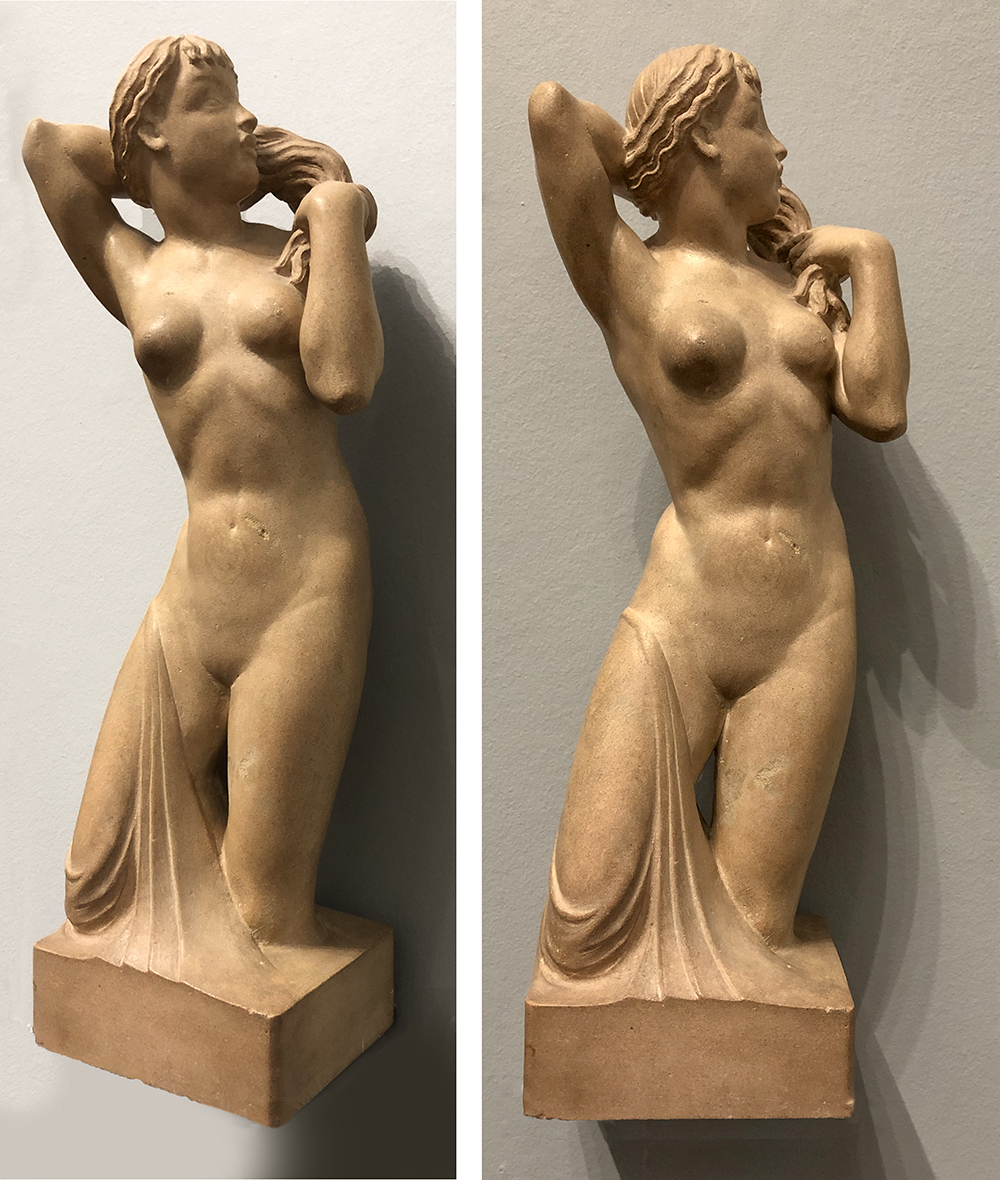
Orlando Dutton (1939) Jeune fille, stone (oblique and front views). Art Gallery of South Australia

In his later years Dutton also painted, showing a self-portrait praised by The Age at the Victorian Artists Society in September 1948, and in its first portrait show in 1949, and from 1961 is his formal oil painting on board of C.S.I.R.O. geologist Sir Frank Stillwell in academic regalia, held in the University of Melbourne. In 1962 he submitted a painting Friday Night to the Crouch Prize at the Ballarat Art Gallery which was noted by critic Arnold Shore as being of "special worth."

In December 1955 Dutton returned with wife Emma to England on the SS Largs Bay intending to live there. He declared in a 1955 article in the Walsall Observer on life in Australia, that "with the stout help of a dear wife, an interesting life has been savoured to the full. We look back with affection to England and after 35 years returned there, but we never allowed our backward glances to prevent us from looking hopefully ahead." In the article he expressed horror at the loss of green fields to housing estates, and while there, agitated for a museum of art in his home town of Walsall.

Mourning his wife Emma who died while they were still in England, he returned again to Melbourne in 1960. On return, he taught sculpture at Prahran Technical College for an unknown period.

== Death ==
Dutton was reported on 24 August 1962 to be missing from his flat in Brougham St., Kew after walking to post a letter 0.8 km away. A number of friends and sculptor colleagues searched Melbourne for him. After a reported sighting of him in Chadstone, police surmised he may have been suffering dementia, though he had written in June a clearly argued letter to the editor of The Age, and in August had joined with Alan Sumner, principal of the Prahran College, in a deputation to the State Government's Chief Secretary Arthur Rylah to advocate for appointment of Melbourne artists to the National Gallery of Victoria board of trustees.

On 2 September, his body was found in the river Yarra at Fairfield. His funeral service was held at Springvale Crematorium on 4 September 1962. The Coroner conducting an inquest into his death in October found no evidence, or signs of violence, to show Dutton might have been pushed into the river, and could discover "no reason why he should have taken his own life," before returning an open finding.

== Exhibitions ==
- 1933, May: Six sculptors; Orlando Dutton, Leslie Bowles, Wallace Anderson, Ola Cohn, George Allen, and Charles Oliver
- 1934, 2–14 October: Victorian Artists Society, East Melbourne
- 1935, 9–16 September: Victorian Artists Society, East Melbourne
- 1935, from 20 December: The Monash Equestrian Memorial; finished sketch model as one of the competitors, with Paul Montford, Lyndon Dadswell, Raynor Hoff, Wallace Anderson, Henry Harvey and A. de Bono, for the Sir John Monash memorial statue commission. Arts and Crafts Society, 220 Collins Street, Melbourne
- 1936, 28 September-11 October: Victorian Artists Society, East Melbourne
- 1939: South Australian Society of Arts Spring show
- 1939, 5 April-3 May: Second Australian Academy of Art exhibition. National Gallery of Victoria
- 1939, from 2 May: Stair Gallery, Victorian Artists Society, East Melbourne
- 1939, 5 April-3 May: Australian Academy of Art exhibition, McAllan Gallery
- 1940 March–April: Third Australian Academy of Art exhibition, Education Department gallery, Sydney
- 1940, from 24 September: Victorian Artists Society Spring Exhibition, East Melbourne
- 1943, 20–31 July: Fifth annual exhibition of the Australian Academy of Art, opened by Robert Menzies. Melbourne Athenaeum
- 1947, from 18 August: Victorian Artists Society Annual Exhibition of Sculpture with 21 participants including Dutton, Andor Mezzaros, Arthur Fleischmann, Ray Ewers and George Allen, opened by Prof. Brian Lewis. Victorian Artists Society Galleries, East Melbourne
- 1948, from 12 May: Diocesan Centenary Celebrations contemporary religious art exhibition, opened by Cardinal Spellman. Lower Town Hall, Melbourne
- 1948, September: Victorian Artists Society Spring Show, Victorian Artists Society Galleries, East Melbourne
- 1948, from 15 November; My Best Picture of the Year, including paintings by Edward Heffernan, B. Fiven, Rollo Thomson, Orlando Dutton, Ian Bow, James Farrell, R. Malcolm Warner, Arnold Calder (stained glass design), and M. McChesney Mathews. Victorian Artists Society Galleries, East Melbourne
- 1949, from 15 August: Victorian Artists Society first portrait show, including works by R.H. Grieve, Fred Williams, Jan Nigro, Charles Bush and Murray Griffin, opened by its president James Quinn
- 1957, 7–29 December: Australian Artists’ Association exhibition, Imperial Institute Art Gallery, London (1 work)

== Awards ==
- 1938: Melrose Prize in Adelaide
- 1956: medal for sculpture exhibited during the Olympic Games held in Victoria

== Commissions ==
- 1922: Four bronze reliefs for WWI monument in Booleroo Centre, South Australia
- 1922: Soldier figure for Kapunda & District Fallen Soldiers Monument
- 1929 Four figures surrounding tower of St Paul's Cathedral, Melbourne (spire constructed 1926–31)
- 1930-31 Two identical sets of figures Faith, Hope and Charity, Manchester Unity Building, Melbourne
- 1930 Allegorical panel, façade of Castlemaine Art Museum
- 1932 Emblem for AMP Society Building, Melbourne
- 1933 reportedly produced a 'mural vase' in cement for Emily McPherson College, Melbourne. Whereabouts of work no longer known.
- 1937 Panels on Anzac House, Melbourne (beside some by Stanley Hammond))
- Stations of the Cross for St Teresa's Church, Essendon.
- Two panels at St John's Church of England, Toorak.
- Symbolic reliefs for National Bank, Melbourne.
- Symbol for Mutual Life and Citizens Assurance - since destroyed.

== Collections ==
- National Gallery of Victoria
- Art Gallery of South Australia
- Castlemaine Art Museum
- Victorian Artists' Society Collection
- University of Melbourne

== Memberships ==
- c. 1922 Royal South Australian Society of Arts (exhibited 1923).
- 1933-39 Victorian Sculptors' Society
- 1943 Made a member of the Australian Academy of Art
- Victorian Artists' Society. President 1946–47, Member until 1955.

== Publications ==
- Orlando Dutton Recumbent Figures on Tombs in English Churches and Cathedrals. Unpublished manuscript which cannot be located.
- Dutton, Orlando (April 1948). "Why Be A Sculptor". The Australian Artist: A Journal of Modern Art. 1 (3).
