= May Butler George =

Australian artist

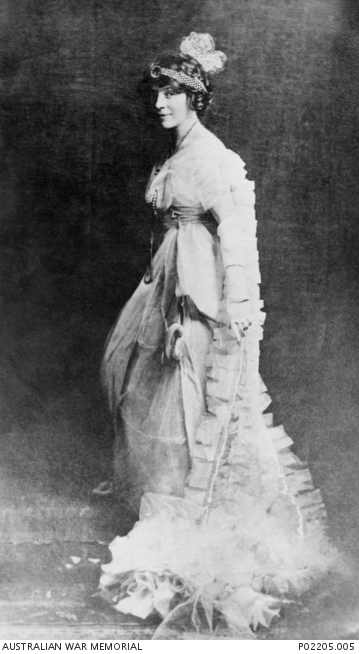
- Born: 1881; Gippsland, Victoria
- Died: 1973 (aged 91–92)
- Notable work: Mount St Quentin, France 1918 for a monument erected in memory of the Second Division AIF.

May Butler George was an Australian artist.

She was born in 1881 in Gippsland, Victoria. Her father, Richard Butler George (1844–1940), was one of the pioneer settlers of Gippsland.

== Artist career ==
Butler George exhibited with the Victoria Artists' Society in 1908 and the Yarra Sculptors’ Society in 1911. Her miniature portraits were shown at the Australian Artists’ exhibition in Melbourne in 1912 and with the sales from this exhibition, she travelled to England. While there Butler George painted portraits of eminent figures including Lord Kitchener, Princess Henry of Battenberg, Sir George Reid. Her work was shown in the Old Salon, Paris in 1914. Butler George's portrait of Miss Fairleigh Cunninghame was shown in the Royal Society of Miniature Painters’ exhibition held in London. She had joined the Melbourne Society of Women Painters and Sculptors as early as 1913 and exhibited with it in 1923. She also exhibited with the NSW Society of Artists and the Royal Art Society at Sydney in 1933.

== War art ==
Butler George was a Voluntary Aid Detachment (VAD) during World War I. After the First World War in 1919, Butler George was commissioned to execute four bronze relief plaques for the pedestal of a statue by fellow Australian artist Charles Web Gilbert. The work was in memory of Australian soldiers who had died in France for the Mont St Quentin Memorial. Butler George was sent to France to visit French battlefields in order to sketch for the panels. Butler George then reworked these sketches at her studio in St Kilda.

During the Second World War the monument was removed by the Germans and in 1948 copies to replace two of the plaques were made by Wallace Anderson. A panel from the 1919 commission titled 2nd Division infantry attack was recast from an original plaster cast in 1996.

The panel was installed in the Australian War Memorial sculpture garden and is displayed on the Western Courtyard. Another work Bringing up the Guns by Butler George is held at the Australian War Memorial, Brigadier Lewis Barker was used as one of the models by the sculptor.

Butler George died in 1973.
