= Brunswick Terracotta Works =

Heritage-listed former pottery in Melbourne, Victoria, Australia

- Location within Melbourne
- Interactive map of the Brunswick Terracotta Works area

General information
- Status: Completed
- Type: Studio office
- Architectural style: Eclectic
- Location: Alfred Street, Brunswick, Melbourne, Victoria, Australia
- Coordinates: 37°46′07″S 144°57′32″E
- Completed: 1887; 139 years ago

Technical details
- Material: Bricks; terracotta

Design and construction
- Architect: Graham Ferry

Victorian Heritage Register
- Official name: Former Ferry Terra Cotta and Enamelled Brickworks Office
- Type: Registered place
- Designated: 9 January 1997
- Reference no.: H1285
- Heritage overlay no.: HO5
- Category: Manufacturing and Processing

The Brunswick Terracotta Works, (Note: Terracotta is sometime spelled as two words, terra cotta.) also known as the Ferry Terracotta Pottery and Brickworks, were a late-nineteenth and early-twentieth century pottery, terracotta, and brickworks factory, located on Alfred Street in Brunswick, an inner northern suburb of Melbourne, in Victoria, Australia.

Whilst most the original site has been destroyed, the small remnant studio office, located at 310 Albert Street, completed in 1887, remains extant and was added to the Victorian Heritage Register on 9 January 1997 in recognition of its historic and architectural importance. The heritage-listed building was repurposed as a cafe in c. 2014.

== History ==
=== Ferry brothers ===
Graham Robert Ferry (1847–1924) and his younger brother, William Ferry (c. 1861–1934) were born in Yorkshire, England and learned their trade as potters at the Linthorpe Art Pottery between 1870s–1880s. At Linthorpe, they were both influenced by Dr Christopher Dresser, a distinguished botanist and freelance designer, who helped to establish the Yorkshire Pottery Works to alleviate local poverty. The Ferry brothers both migrated to Colonial Australia in the 1880s and 1890s and became successful sculptors, ceramicists, and businessmen.

==== Graham ====
Graham qualified as an architect which included the use of clay as a modelling medium for the design of architectural terracotta embellishments which in turn provided a new career direction. At Linthorpe, he held the prestigious position of first modeller and he sculpted original pieces out of clay which were usually designed by Dresser. Moulds of Ferry's work were taken which in turn produced the famed Linthorpe art wares.

Ferry migrated to Melbourne in 1882 and initially worked at Alfred Cornwell’s Brunswick Pottery. During this period, he modelled a fine bust of Alfred Cornwell and a considerable amount in terracotta, some of which was exhibited at the colonial exhibitions. His bust of Oliver Twist was often a central attraction. Ferry is almost certainly responsible for the introduction of the fanciful terracotta roof finial sculptures that the Brunswick Pottery manufactured, principally dragons, grotesques, eagles and other figures.

In July 1886 he started his own pottery called the Brunswick Terracotta Works. The heart and centre of Ferry’s terracotta works was his studio, built in 1887, where he sculpted his figures and decorative building embellishments. In 1898/99 Graham Ferry exhibited with the Yarra Sculptors Society, alongside such contemporaries as C. Douglas Richardson and C. Web Gilbert. He exhibited a life study and some pug dogs, all in terracotta. His brother, William, also exhibited with the society, making it evident from their participation that they wanted to be acknowledged as artists.

After surviving the economic crash of the 1890s, Ferry expanded his output to include roofing and ridging tiles. Graham had great business acumen and purchased Whitby house, in Brunswick, as his principal residence in 1903. After his death on 24 November 1924, William continued to work at the pottery, manager by their sister, Hephzibah. It was finally wound up in 1926, ending 49 years of pottery manufacture on the site.

==== William ====
William was a unique force in the Australian colonial pottery industry. He was trained in England by the avant garde of the Arts and Crafts Movement and arrived in Australia, partly for family reasons and partly to start his own art pottery works. His pottery conspicuously stands out from that of other Australian colonial manufacturers because of its original design and highly artistic nature. He made coarse clay vessels but of beautiful and elegant form, a lonely attempt to marry art and industry in the colonies.

After his time at Linthrope, William worked for 14 years at the Burmantofts Pottery in Leeds, between 1880 and 1894, where he was a designer and later a manager. He was responsible for the first art pottery that they sold in 1881. After his extensive period at Burmantofts, he was employed for a few months in Lorraine, France; most likely at the Niderviller factory.

William and his mother, Esther, arrived in Australia in 1896 to reunite with most of their family. William started producing pottery and concentrated on the production of jardinières, pedestals, vases and his imaginative grotesques. Called the Victoria Art Pottery, he successfully ran this enterprise for 16 years until it closed in 1912. He then rented part of Graham's works, where he continued to make his art pottery until 1921 when he retired; he died in 1934. William Ferry can be called Australia’s first art potter as his work predates both Alan Finlay and Merric Boyd, who did not throw his first pot until 1908.

== Description of the studio office ==
Built of red brick, and decorated with an ornate terracotta turret and finely crafted terracotta architectural mouldings, it is an eclectic composition of Picturesque architectural elements stood at the works entrance as a built advertisement to the brickmaker's and potter's craft.

The studio office is one of few buildings to survive from the 'Little Staffordshire' of brickworks and potteries that predominated in Brunswick for over one hundred years. Brunswick had the largest concentration of clay industry works in Victoria. The studio office is architecturally important for its unusual eclectic design which creatively incorporates a range of late nineteenth century terracotta building products into the fabric both for decoration and as a display of the type of wares produced within the works. The former City of Brunswick purchased the site in 1928 filling in the clay pits and demolishing all buildings other than the studio office which was used to house the scale for a public weighbridge. The scale, manufactured by the Australasian Scale Company of Sydney, remains inside the building.

The studio office was repurposed as a cafe in c. 2014.

== See also ==
- Australian art
- Linthorpe Art Pottery
- List of places on the Victorian Heritage Register in the City of Merri-bek
