= Leslie Bowles =

Australian sculptor (1885–1954)

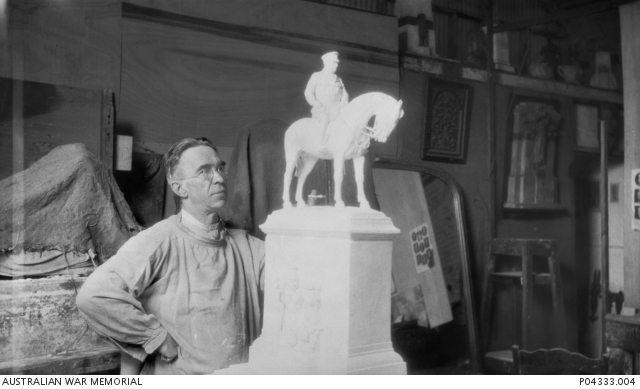
Bowles photographed between 1930 and 1935 with a sculpture he was working on

William Leslie Bowles (26 February 1885 – 21 February 1954), commonly referred to as Leslie Bowles or W. Leslie Bowles, was an Australian sculptor and medallist.

== Education ==
Bowles was born to William Hixson Bowles, compositor, and his wife Rachel Bowles, née Mark, in Leichhardt, Sydney, and was educated at Kangaroo Point State School, Brisbane, where his interest in art was encouraged by a teacher, Thomas Fisher. He studied sculpture at the Brisbane Technical College under L. J. Harvey from 1902 to 1908, and was awarded a travelling scholarship by the director, David R. McConnell, which took him to the "South London School of Arts", presumably the Royal College of Art. There he met Sir Bertram Mackennal, with whom he worked for three years, and was meanwhile a part-time student at the Royal Academy 1910–1914. Around this time he sold his statue Dancer to the Art Gallery of New South Wales.

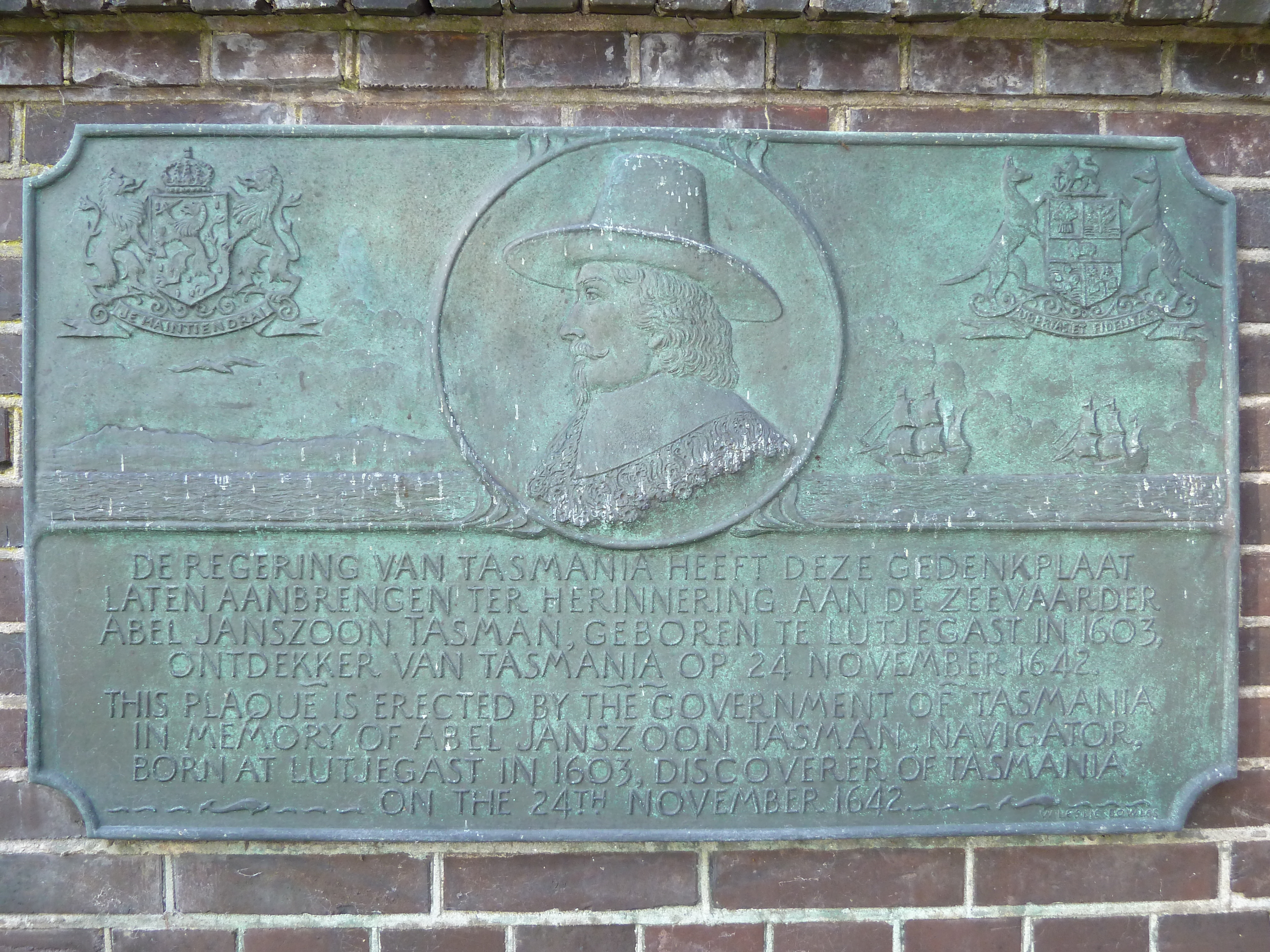
Memorial stone in Lutjegast (Groningen, Netherlands), dedicated to Abel Tasman

== England and Europe ==
Bowles was in London at the outbreak of World War I, and enlisted with the British army, serving in the 25th London Regiment, and the Tank Corps, when it was founded in 1916. After demobilisation he enrolled with the Royal Academy for further training. According to one reference, in 1918 he was attached to the Australian War Records Section along with Web Gilbert and Wallace Anderson. He married Mary Lees of Kelso, Scotland in 1924, and was involved in the 1924–25 Wembley British Empire Exhibition, perhaps helping H. C. Smart organise the Australian pavilion.

In June 1922 designs were invited for a proposed monument to diggers who fought in Egypt; a statue to be erected at Port Said at the head of the Suez Canal. Bowles' design, in association with architect G. G. Prentice, was judged in third place — the winner being C. Web Gilbert, with architects Stephenson and Meldrum.

== Return to Australia ==
Bowles and his new wife returned to Melbourne in 1924 to work for the Australian War Memorial (AWM). The sculptor Web Gilbert, who created the first of the AWM dioramas, died suddenly on 3 October 1925 while working on the full-size model for the Port Said memorial. That project was completed by Paul Montford and Sir Bertram Mackennal. Gilbert had another commission in train, a large bronze bas relief memorial to John Dias, former secretary of the Carpenters' Union. Bowles completed that work and took on several diorama projects:

- Australian Light Horse in the Sinai Desert, sculptures by Web Gilbert and landscape by Don Evans.
- The Australian Light Horse at Magdhaba
- The Australian defences at Dernancourt
- Desert Patrol
- Lone Pine, by Wallace Anderson
- Semakh, by Wallace Anderson
- Bullecourt, by Bowles, landscape by George Browning
- "Somme Winter 1916–17"
- "Pozieres Heights 1916"
- Magdhaba, by Bowles, on landscape by Don Evans
- Battle of Romani 4 August 1916

This list is incomplete and not reliable.
The mural backdrops were painted by Louis McCubbin.

His submission for the 1926 Henry Lawson Memorial design competition was judged second to that of G. W. Lambert. Despite this disappointment, Bowles completed his model, which he showed to the Lawson Society in April 1928. Progress on Lambert's statuary group had not stalled — cast in bronze in England, it was installed in The Domain, Sydney, and unveiled on 28 July 1931.

== Work ==
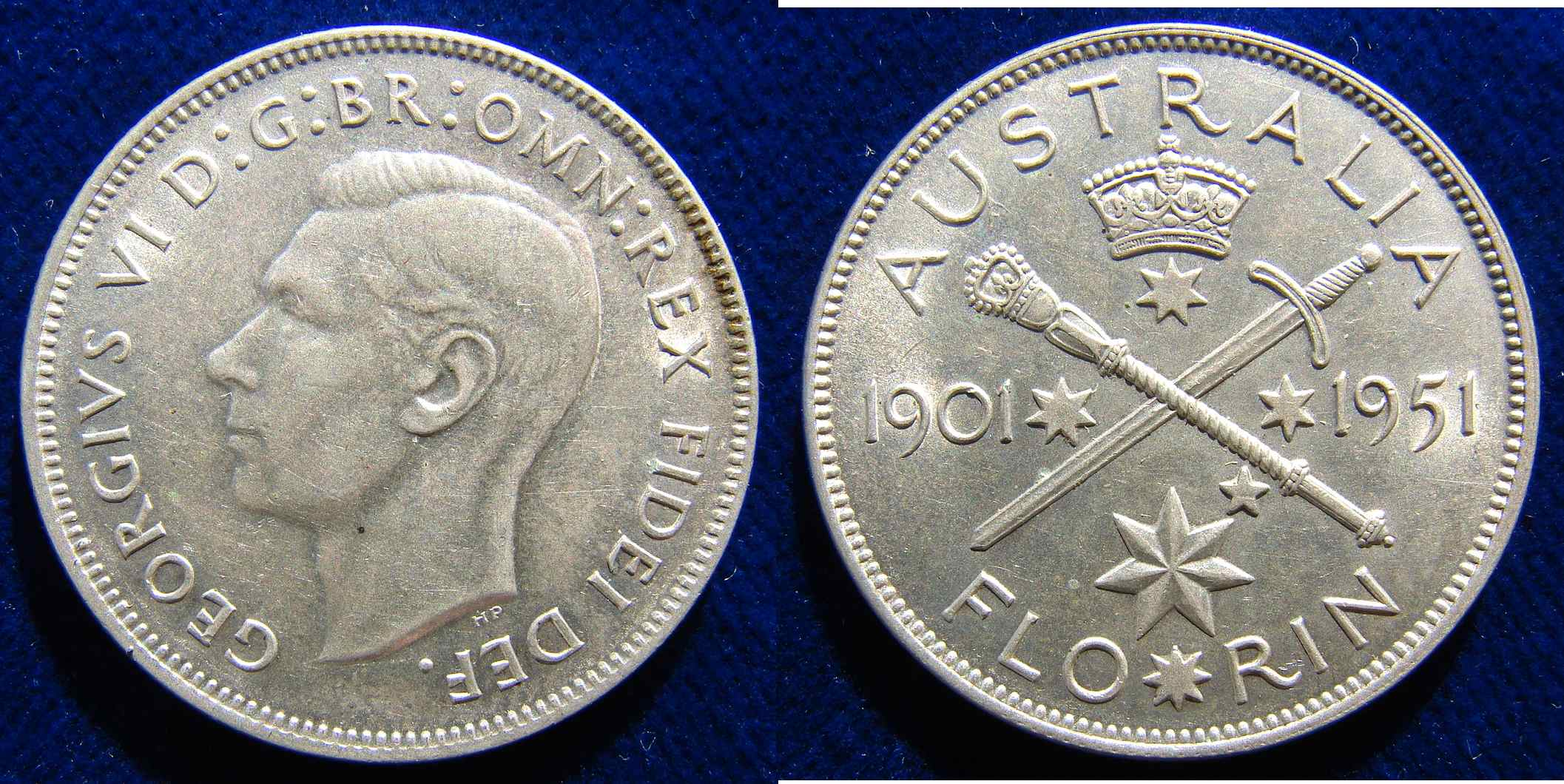
The reverse of the Australian Florin 1951 was designed by William Leslie Bowles to commemorate the 50 Years of the Commonwealth of Australia. This coin carries the standard obverse designed by Thomas Humphrey Paget

He started work in Mackennal's studio. After the war he worked and exhibited in England. Later in the Twenties in Australia, Bowles was employed at Melbourne Exhibition Building on the Australian War Memorial. In 1926 he had become a member of the Royal Society of British Sculptors. He became mainly connected with the design of large monuments, nevertheless he was also invited to design Australian coins and medals.

Bowles designed the sculpture of Sir John Monash which stands at the Shrine of Remembrance in Melbourne. He designed several sculptures at the Australian War Memorial in Canberra, including the Man with the donkey (a tribute to John Simpson and his donkey). He designed the memorial for the 9th Battalion (AIF) in the crypt of Brisbane's Anzac Square. Bowles designed decorative bronze window panels for the Queensland Commonwealth Bank Building in Queen Street, Brisbane (built 1927–1930) with his work depicting the trinity images of Industry, Agriculture and Commerce. He designed sculptures of "Diana and her hounds" and others for Fitzroy Gardens in Melbourne in 1935. He designed the King George V memorial in Melbourne. He designed engravings for Australian banknotes released in 1953.

In 1933 Bowles was, with Ola Cohn, Wallace Anderson and Orlando Dutton, a founder of the short-lived Sculptors' Society of Australia, which succeeded the Yarra Sculptors' Society and was followed in 1948 by the Victorian Sculptors' Society.

During the Second World War, Bowles recommended the sculptor Ray Ewers be appointed war artist, with the rank of lieutenant. Bowles and Ewers subsequently worked together.

He died at Frankston, Victoria

== See also ==
- Australian official war artists
