= Wallace Anderson =

Australian art teacher and sculptor

William Wallace Anderson (20 January 1888 – 7 October 1975), invariably known as Wallace Anderson or W. Wallace Anderson, was an Australian art teacher and sculptor, known for memorials at the Australian War Memorial, Canberra and throughout Victoria.

== History ==
Anderson was born in Dean, Victoria, third child and twin son of William Anderson, MLA and his wife Helen Glover, née Naples. He was educated at Geelong College and Gordon Technical College, taking art classes part-time with J. R. Tranthim-Fryer (died 13 July 1928) and Charles Richardson, later conducting classes himself. Anderson enlisted with the First AIF in June 1915. His elder brother, Albert Naples Anderson, enlisted in December 1914, fought at Gallipoli and was wounded at Lone Pine. He was repatriated, then in January 1917 re-enlisted with the 8th Light Horse in Egypt and was killed in action in April 1917. Anderson served in France as a lieutenant in the 23rd Battalion, and in 1918 was attached to the Australian War Records Section, London, along with sculptors W. Leslie Bowles and C. Web Gilbert, and toured battlefields in France, Egypt and Palestine, making sketches and notes for later reference.

In 1920 he returned to Melbourne, working for the Australian War Museum, Canberra, producing the intricate figures for several of the battlefield dioramas, then from 1930 was engaged in work for other clients. Well-known public pieces include:

- Bronze frieze on memorial stone (1930) at Ararat
- "The Man and His Donkey" (1936), elsewhere named as John Simpson Kirkpatrick at the Shrine of Remembrance, Melbourne
- "King George V" (1937), in Geelong
- Series of nine busts of Australian prime ministers, in the Botanic Gardens, Ballarat.

Anderson was a member of the Australian Academy of Art, Australian Sculptors' Society, Victorian Artists Society, and the Victorian Sculptors' Society, and exhibited regularly.

== Family ==
Anderson married Gladys Ada Andrews (died 25 September 1952) on 6 May 1916.

They had a son Rod Anderson and daughters Lucie Cleary and Joy Bleakley.

== See also ==
- Australian official war artists
