= Margaret Baskerville =

Australian sculptor (1861–1930)

Margaret Francis Ellen Baskerville
- Born: 14 September 1861; Melbourne, Colony of Victoria
- Died: 6 July 1930 (aged 68); Melbourne, Victoria, Australia
- Known for: Sculpture
- Spouse: Charles Douglas Richardson (m. 1914)

Margaret Francis Ellen Baskerville (14 September 1861 – 6 July 1930), was an Australian sculptor, water-colourist, and educator. She is regarded as Victoria's first professional woman sculptor. Baskerville was born on 14 September 1861 in Melbourne, Colony of Victoria.

== Training ==
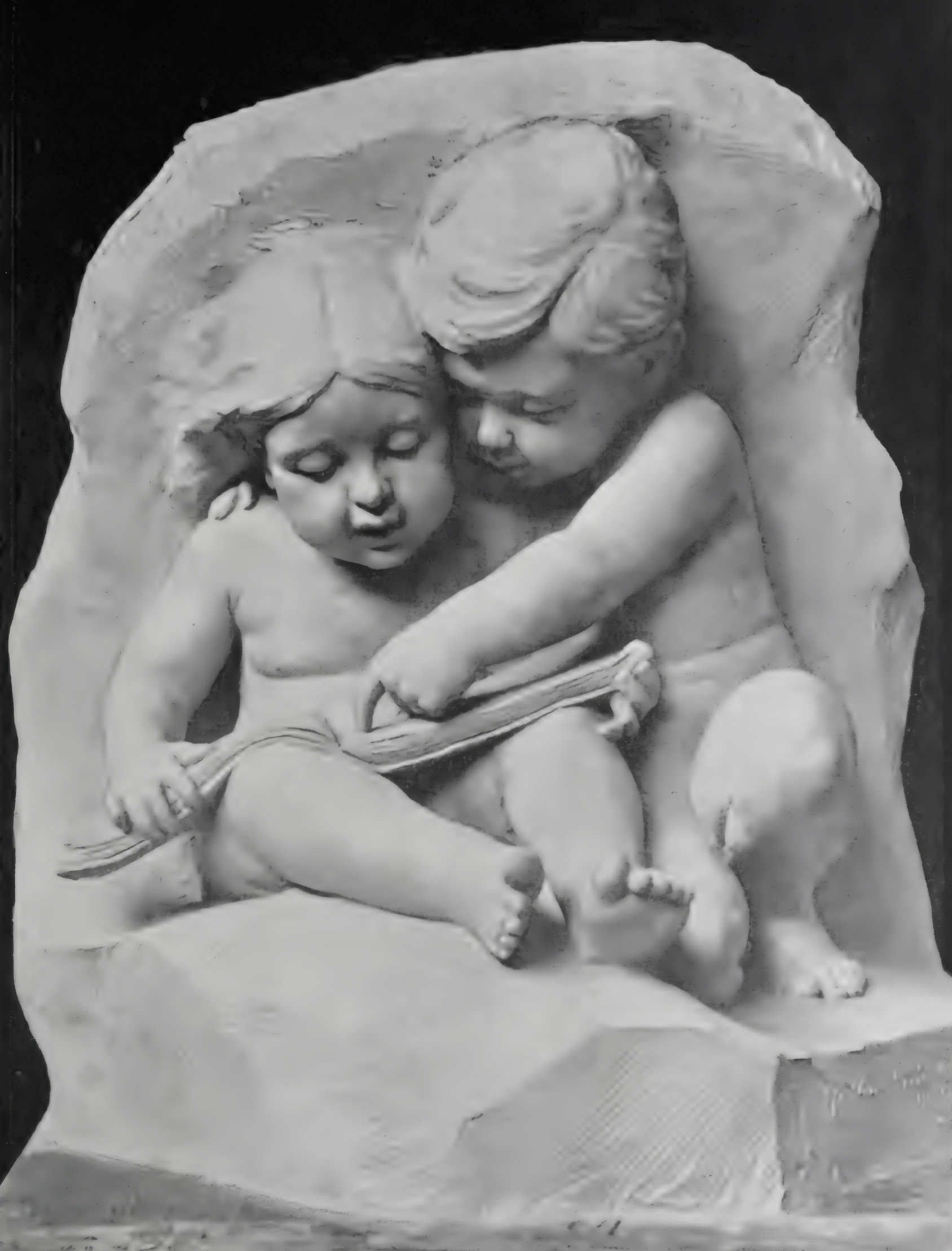
Margaret Baskerville (c.1905) 'Dawn of the Mind', relief sculpture

From 1879-1887 Baskerville attended the National Gallery Schools in Melbourne, in both the School of Painting and the School of Design. In 1886 she joined and was an active member of the bohemian Buonarotti Club in its last two years. From 1904-1906 she attended the Royal College of Art Modelling School in London, England.

Baskerville returned to Australia in 1906. In the 1907 Australian Exhibition of Women's Work she won First Prize for 'Best Model of a Figure or Group of Figures in Marble or Bronze' for Dawn of the Mind (later purchased by Nellie Melba and illustrated in Melba's Gift Book of Australian Art And Literature), and 2nd in Medal Design

She assisted her former teacher Douglas Richardson in a shared studio. The two married in 1914.

== Professional sculptor ==
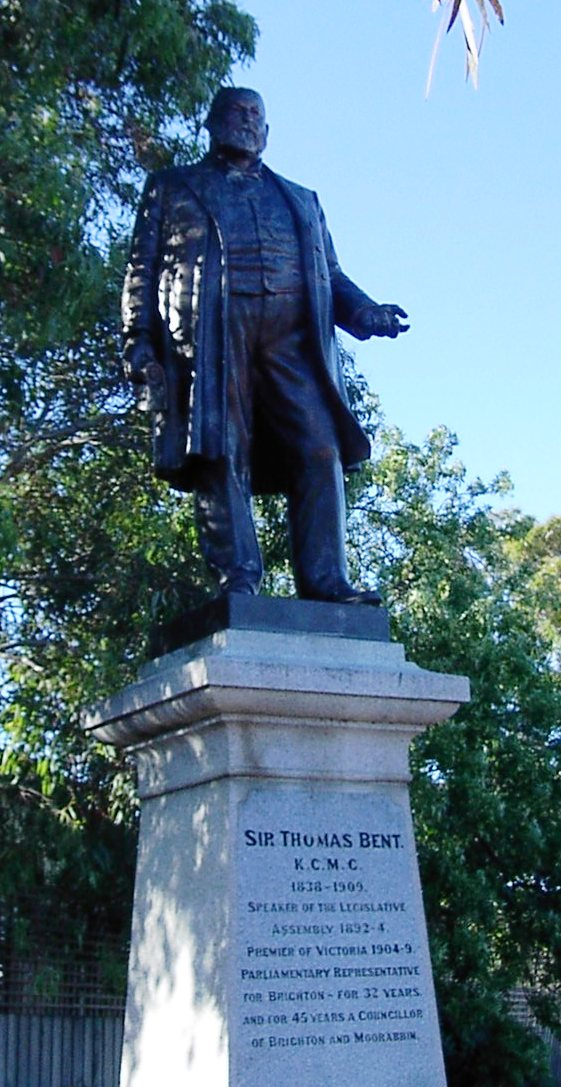

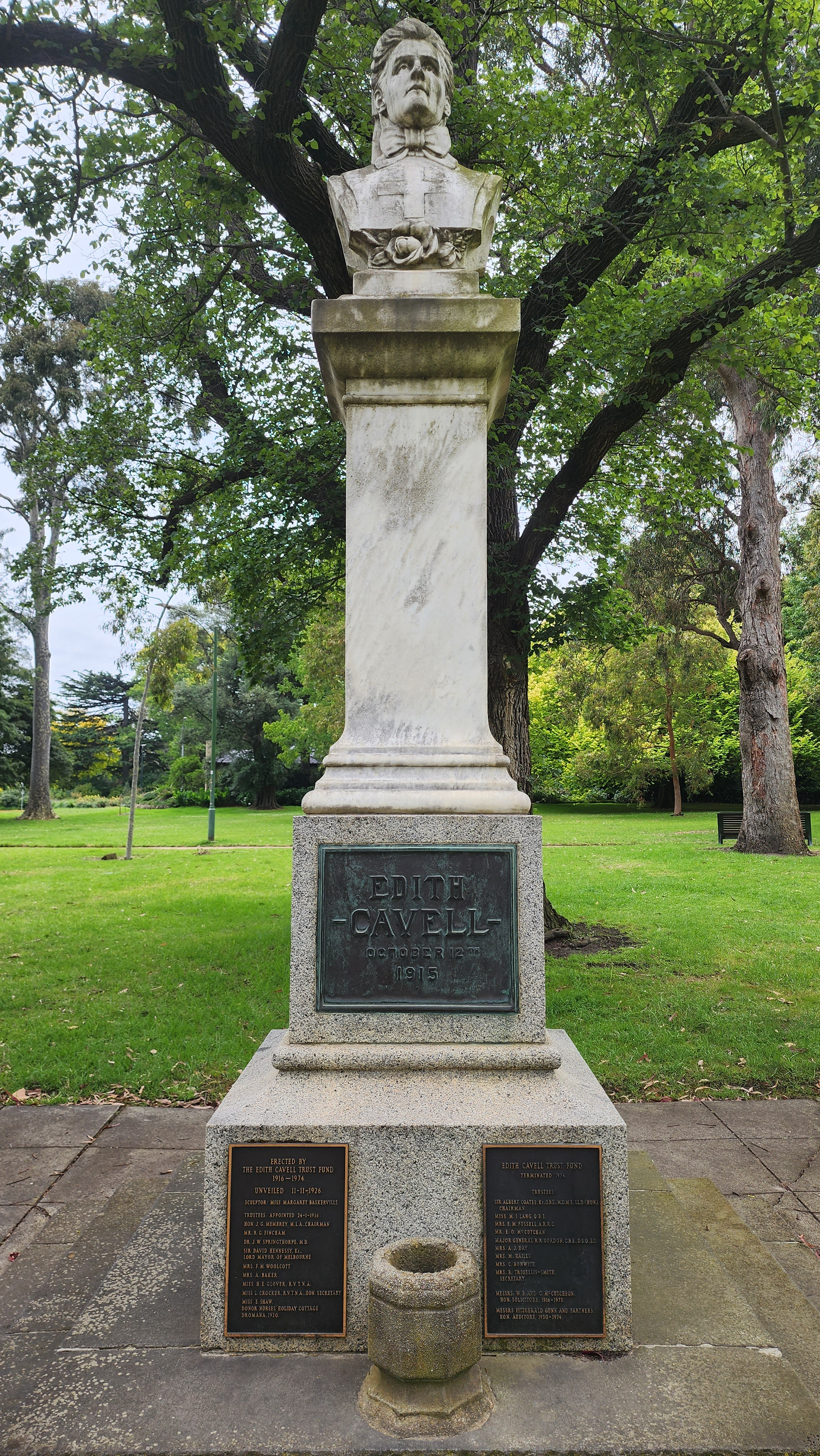
Bust of Edith Cavell in Kings Domain, Melbourne

After WWI Baskerville created a number of soldier monuments in Australia. Her first commission was the major commission for a bronze monument to the 22nd Premier of Victoria, Sir Thomas Bent. She was the first Australian woman sculptor to receive this honour. She also produced the James Cuming memorial, and Melbourne's Edith Cavell Memorial.

In 1916 Walter Burley Griffin and Marion Mahony Griffin undertook for the entrepreneurial Greek émigré restaurateur (Greek Consul-General) Antony J. J. Lucas the luxury refit of the Vienna Cafe at 270 Collins Street, Melbourne in a transitional Art Nouveau/Art Deco style. They commissioned local artists; Baskerville jeweller Charles Costerman for the sculptural elements and Bertha Merfield for a mural.

== Exhibiting artist ==
Baskerville was a member of the Melbourne Society of Women Painters and Sculptors. Other memberships include the Yarra Sculptors' Society, the Victorian Sketching Club, the Women's Art Club, the council of the Australian Institute of the Arts and Literature, the Austral Salon and the Victorian Artists Society. Baskerville exhibited her work regularly, her last being in 1929.

== Death and legacy ==
Baskerville died on 6 July 1930 in Melbourne. Baskerville Street in the Canberra suburb of Chisholm is named in her honour.
