= Edith Cavell Memorial (Melbourne) =

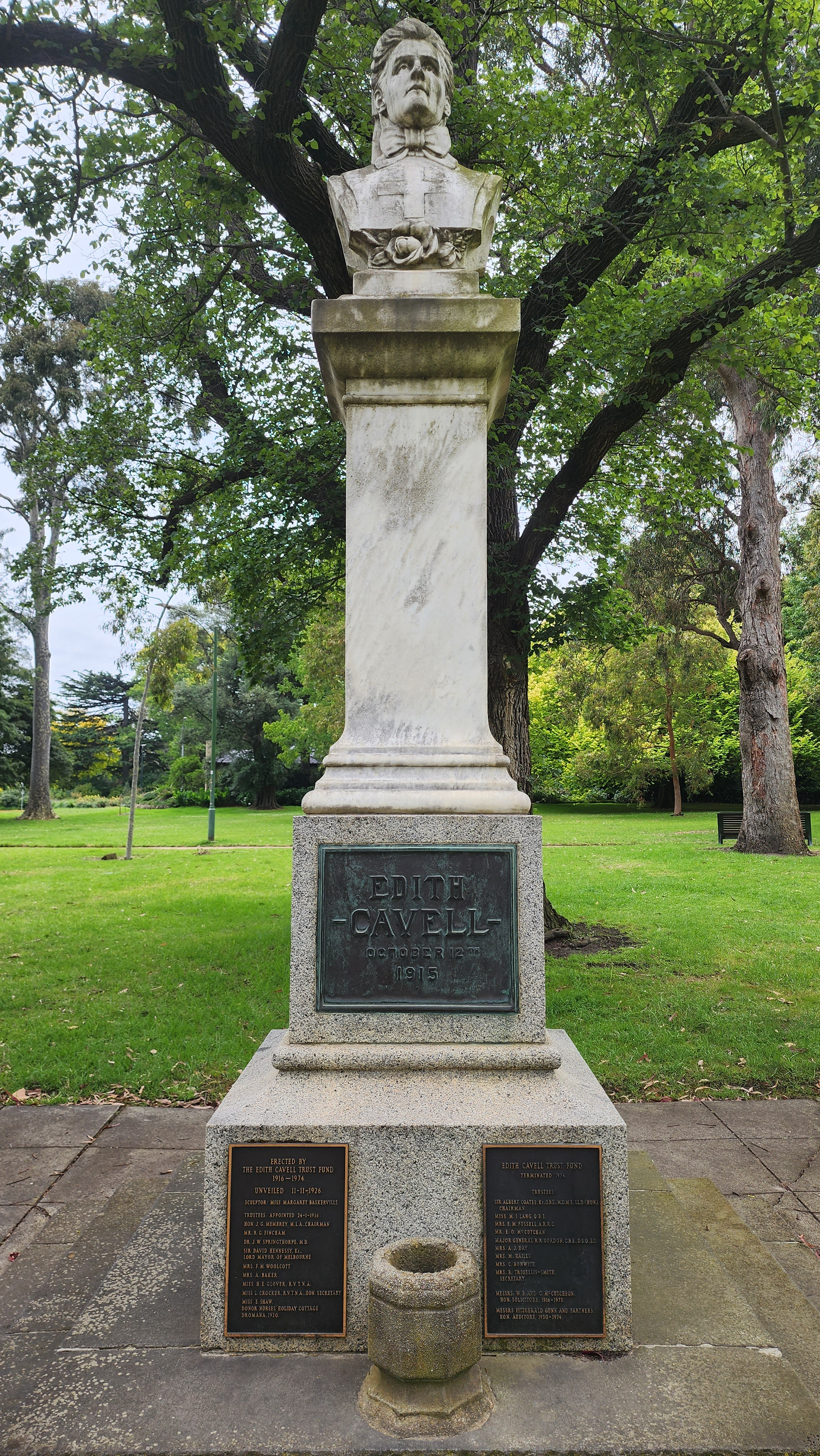
- Interactive map of Edith Cavell Memorial
- Location: Kings Domain, Melbourne
- Coordinates: 37°49′41″S 144°58′25″E
- Designer: Margaret Baskerville
- Type: Bust on a pedestal
- Material: marble and granite with bronze reliefs
- Opening date: 12 November 1926
- Dedicated to: Edith Cavell

The Edith Cavell Memorial is an outdoor memorial to Edith Cavell located in Kings Domain, Melbourne, Australia. It consists of a marble bust on a granite pedestal; the bust was sculpted by Margaret Baskerville. The memorial was unveiled in November 1926.

== Background ==
Cavell was a British nurse from Norfolk. She was matron at Berkendael Medical Institute in Brussels, Belgium, when World War I broke out in 1914. In addition to nursing soldiers from both sides without distinction, she assisted some 200 Allied soldiers to escape from German-occupied Belgium. She was arrested in August 1915, court-martialled, found guilty of treason, and shot by a German firing squad on 12 October 1915. Her remains were initially buried in Belgium, but returned to Britain after the war in May 1919 for a state funeral at Westminster Abbey before she was finally buried at Norwich Cathedral.

In 1916, the Edith Cavell Trust Fund was officially inaugurated in Victoria, and received significant financial support. Some of this was used to support war nurses on their return to Australia, and some for the commissioning of the memorial. The Edith Cavell Trust Fund commissioned the bust in 1917; due to the difficulty of obtaining Carrara marble from Italy after the war and the large number of Baskerville's other commissions, the memorial was not completed until 1926.

== Description ==
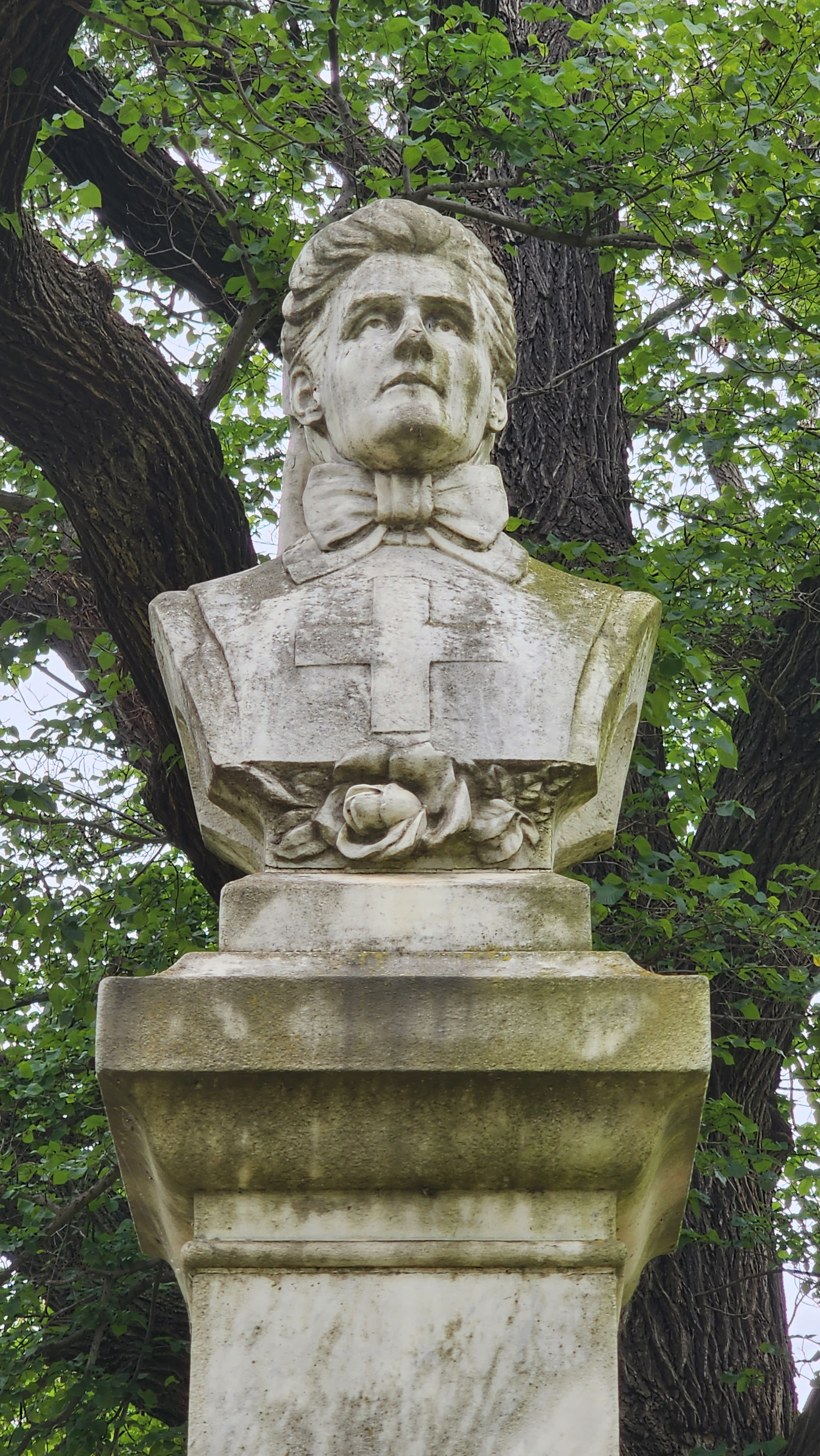
Bust of Edith Cavell

The bust of Cavell in her nurse's uniform was sculpted in Carrara marble by Australian sculptor Margaret Baskerville, who had created a number of civic memorials in Melbourne and in rural towns. The bust sits atop a granite pedestal, which has cast-bronze relief panels on its sides depicting scenes from Cavell's life, arrest and execution. The plaster maquette of the bust is held in the Bayside Gallery in Melbourne.

On the front of the base is the inscription "Edith Cavell, October 12th 1915". At the back of the base is the inscription "Nurse Cavell's last message to the world "But this I would say, standing as I do in view of God and Eternity, I realise that patriotism is not enough. I must have no hatred or bitterness to anyone.""

The memorial was unveiled on 12 November 1926 by Lieutenant-General Sir Harry Chauvel (chief of the general staff). An official guard and a military band from the Victoria Barracks also attended.

The memorial has been a location for Anzac Day services and other military commemorations and services.

== See also ==
- Edith Cavell Memorial, a memorial located in London, England
