= Whitby House =

Heritage-listed house in Melbourne, Victoria, Australia

Whitby house
- Location within Melbourne
- Former names: Whitbyfield
- Etymology: Edward Whitby and family

General information
- Status: Completed
- Type: House, coach house and stables
- Architectural style: Victorian Rustic Gothic
- Location: 28 Whitby Street, Brunswick, Melbourne, Victoria, Australia
- Coordinates: 37°45′51″S 144°56′50″E
- Completed: c.1850; 176 years ago
- Client: Edward Whitby
- Owner: Edward Whitby (1849–1876); Alfred Theodore Somers (c. 1876–1903); Graham Ferry (1903–1925); Ralph Loch Garett (1925–????); anor

Technical details
- Material: Bricks; stucco; stone; slate; timber; weatherboard
- Floor count: 1–2 storeys
- Grounds: 2 ha (5 acres) (1850s–1925)

Design and construction
- Architect: John Gill

Victorian Heritage Register
- Official name: Whitby house
- Type: Registered place
- Designated: 28 March 1984
- Reference no.: H0546
- Heritage overlay no.: HO197
- Category: Residential buildings (private)

Register of the National Estate
- Official name: Whitby House and Remains of Stable
- Type: Defunct register
- Designated: 30 June 1992
- Reference no.: 511

The Whitby house is a Victorian Colonial house, at 28 Whitby Street, Brunswick, an inner northern suburb of Melbourne, Australia.

The house was added to the Victorian Heritage Register on 28 March 1984; and was also added to non-statutory lists by the Victorian branch of the National Trust on 7 May 1981 and the now defunct Register of the National Estate on 30 June 1992.

== History ==
Edward Whitby was a merchant who operated his business from Flinders Lane in Melbourne. In 1849, Whitby purchased approximately one hectare (two acres) in Brunswick, and in the early 1850s, constructed "Whitbyfield", that comprised a house, coach house and stables.

Whitby died on 28 June 1876 and his estate passed to his wife, who sold the house and other buildings, set on two hectares (five acres), to Alfred Theodore Somers, a publican, in c. 1876 – c. 1879. He rented out the property only living there in 1888–89. The property was sold to Graham Ferry in 1903, the owner of the Brunswick Terracotta Works. Ferry added a single-storey music room in c. 1907 – c. 1909.

From 1923, portions of the property were sub-divided and all portions sold. After Ferry's death in 1924, sub-division of an allotment on the eastern side of the property resulted in the demolition of half of the coach house and stable building and sub-division of a number of allotments to the north created Ferry Street. Ralph Loch Garett, a local builder, bought the portion containing the house and remaining part of the stables in 1925. The house was later converted in flats.

== Description ==
The original eight-roomed house, of one and two storeys, with adjacent coach house and stables, has stucco walls, a step-pitched slate roof, prominent gable, gables dormers, fretted barge and gutter boards, oriel window on the south facade, and paired octagonal chimneys above a slate roof.

Designed by John Gill (Note: Gill also designed other well-known Melbourne buildings such as the Royal Terrace (1853–58), the Collins Street Baptist Church (1845, demolished), and Goldsborough Mort Woolstore, 574-528 Bourke Street (1862) in Melbourne; Invergowrie (c. 1846) and The Hawthorns (1846–47) in Hawthorn; Banyule Homestead (1846) and St. John's Anglican Church (1849–51) in Heidelberg; and Barham House (1850), in St Kilda.) in a Victorian Rustic Gothic style, the house and associated structures were comparable to a number of other large houses of the period.

In detailing it reflects an English Tudor influence with fretted barge and gutter boards and paired octagonal chimneys. The gable ends originally had heavily decorated half-timbering and squat timber finials (since removed). The 1900s music room addition was in the style of the original house and introduced a half-timber effect to gables and fanciful carved brackets. It is of special interest for the carved Chimera fixed to the bottom of the brackets.

In the 1920s the original verandah was partly enclosed and the remainder demolished and various unsympathetic alterations and additions were made. The interior was further altered to convert the house to a series of separate flats.

Whitby House is one of the earliest surviving buildings in Brunswick and is associated with the earliest settlement on the northern fringe of the city of Melbourne. It is a rare survivor of the Victorian Rustic Gothic houses constructed in Melbourne in the 1850s and is representative of a small but influential stream in early Victorian architecture. The building has suffered alterations to its detail internally and externally, and it retains its basic architectural form and concept.

=== Auction listing, 1870 ===
Listed for auction on 11 April 1870, (Note: However, did not sell in 1870. Property was listed for auction by Whitby's Estate in September 1876.) "Whitbyfield" was described by the listing agent as follows:

A Substantial, Commodious and Gentlemanly Residence, Situate in Close Proximity to the Moonee Ponds, a Mile off the Sydney road, Brunswick, and Adjacent to the Properties of Messrs. Michael Dawson, Graham, Beckott, Melville, Pryce, etc.
WM. PERRY and Co have received instructions from Edward Whitby, Esq , J P., to SELL by AUCTION, at their rooms, 14 Collins Street West, on Monday, 11th April, at twelve o'clock.

All that piece or parcel of freehold land, situate near the Moonee Ponds, Brunswick, and containing by measurement about 5 1/4 acres, more or less, and on which is erected a convenient well built brick house (stuccoed on the weather side), on stone. foundation, slated roof having a fine double lined verandah on three sides, about 10ft. wide; a tastefully-planned garden, lawn, kitchen garden, paddock laid down with English grass and clover.

The MAIN HOUSE, which is a two-storeyed building, has on the ground floor:

- drawing room, with handsome bow window, about 19ft x 17ft, and 12ft. high
- dining room, about 16ft x 16ft, do
- Bedroom, about 16ft x 12ft
- Bedroom, about 18ft 16ft
- Kitchen, fitted with an order, pantry' arranged with shelves, and cellar for wine, etc.; scullery, with water laid on and a store or occasional room

The upper floor, approached by an easy and wide staircase with a large landing, gives access to three comfortable bedrooms, one of which has an oriel window, and from which is seen the bay, the Benevolent Asylum, etc., and from the others a pleasing landscape view of Essendon, Monavale, Pascoevale, etc.

Entrance hall about 10 x 30, with folding green baize doors, enclosing the bedrooms, kitchen, etc.;. Outside of the verandah is a fine terrace about 3ft. high, forming delightful accommodation for a prompt made.

BRICK STABLE VG: On stone foundations, for two horses, paved with bluestone pitchers and bricks, slated roof, harnessroom, tool closet, carriage house, and capacious hay-loft.

The entrance gates are handsome, being similar to those at the opening into Temple-court Chancery lane, and are supported on two worked stone pillars, and two brick pillars upon stone, and the property is well and securely fenced. The frontage has a substrate for brick wall some 90ft. long on stone foundation, whilst the garden is a neat picket fence, and the stabling, etc., is enclosed with 6ft. paling, and has a distinct entrance thereto in the rear. The weatherboard buildings consist of stabling for three horses, hay and milking shed, piggeries, and other conveniences. There is also a very large tank, built of brick, cemented, and arched over, which, from the extent of slate roofing, receives copious supplies through underground pipes, that a deficiency has never been experienced in the driest season.

The above house was built under the superintendence of the late John Gill, Esq in a most substantial manner, and of the best materials, and the property can be recommended as a desirable residence for any family requiring a quiet and respectable home, being now and for the past three years rented by Basil Gray, Esq., whose tenancy is just expiring.

For cards to view, and all other information, apply to the auctioneers. Title guaranteed, and terms very liberal. One-fourth cash; balance 6, 12, 18, and 24 months, with 8 per cent, interest.

— Advertisement in The Argus, 2 April 1870.

== See also ==
- Architecture of Melbourne
- Brunswick Terracotta Works
- List of places on the Victorian Heritage Register in the City of Merri-bek
