= Ray Ewers =

Australian sculptor (1917–1998)

- Born: Raymond Boultwood Ewers; 20 August 1917; Wyalong, New South Wales
- Died: 5 June 1998
- Known for: Sculptor

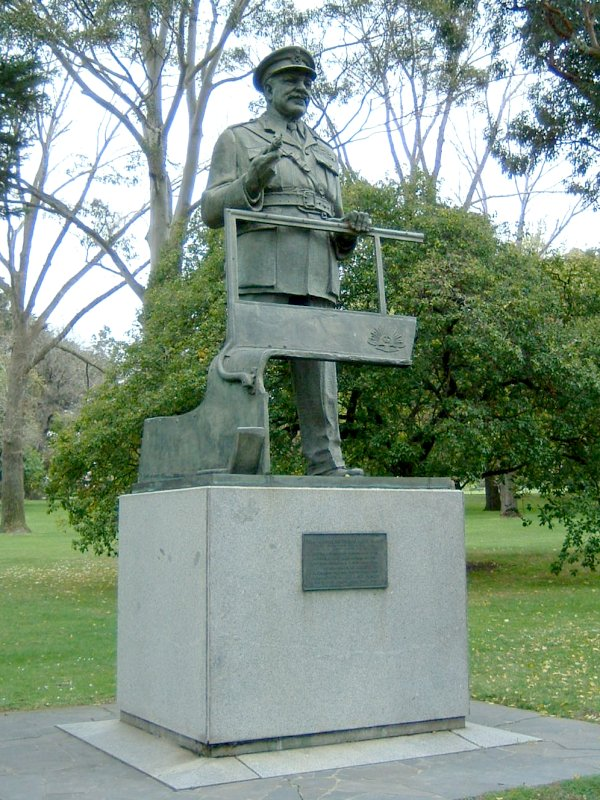
Statue of Thomas Blamey, erected in 1960

Raymond Boultwood Ewers OAM (20 August 1917 – 5 June 1998) was an Australian sculptor, best known for his sculpture Australian Serviceman in the Australian War Memorial sculpture garden in Canberra.

Ewers was born in Wyalong, New South Wales. He worked as a jackaroo before he entered the Working Men's College in Melbourne (nowadays the Royal Melbourne Institute of Technology), where he studied from 1936 to 1940. William Leslie Bowles chose him as his assistant.

During World War II, Ewers enlisted as a sapper in the Australian Imperial Force in 1941. Upon recommendation by Bowles, he was transferred and made an official war artist with the rank of lieutenant.

From 1943 until 1958, Ewers produced 32 dioramas depicting war scenes. He also worked together with Bowles on the statues of King George V and of John Monash, and produced until the 1960s 22 statues of his own design for the War Memorial. His Australian Serviceman was originally placed in the Hall of Memory, where it was displayed from 1958 until 1993, when it was moved to the sculpture garden.

He was a member of Victorian Sculptors' Society and its president in 1954.

Ewers was awarded the Medal of the Order of Australia in the 1995 Australia Day Honours for his "service to the arts, particularly as a sculptor".
