= Sculptors' Society of Australia =

Australian artists' society, 1932–1939

The Sculptors’ Society of Australia was formed in 1932 and ceased its activity with the onset of WW2, in 1939.

== History ==
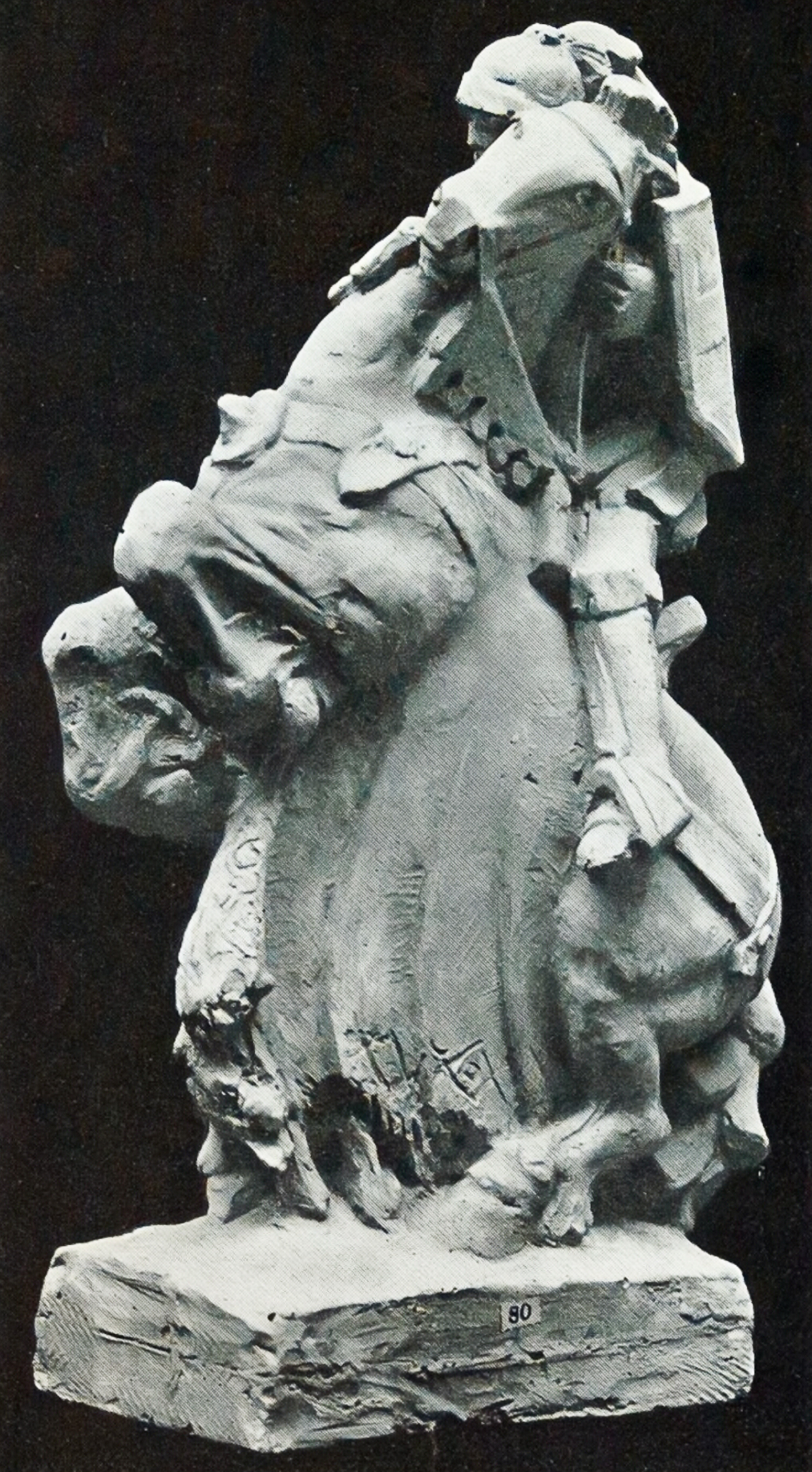
Orlando Dutton (1933) St. George. Plaster sketch for stone, from the first group exhibition of sculpture to be held in Melbourne. Illustrated in Art in Australia

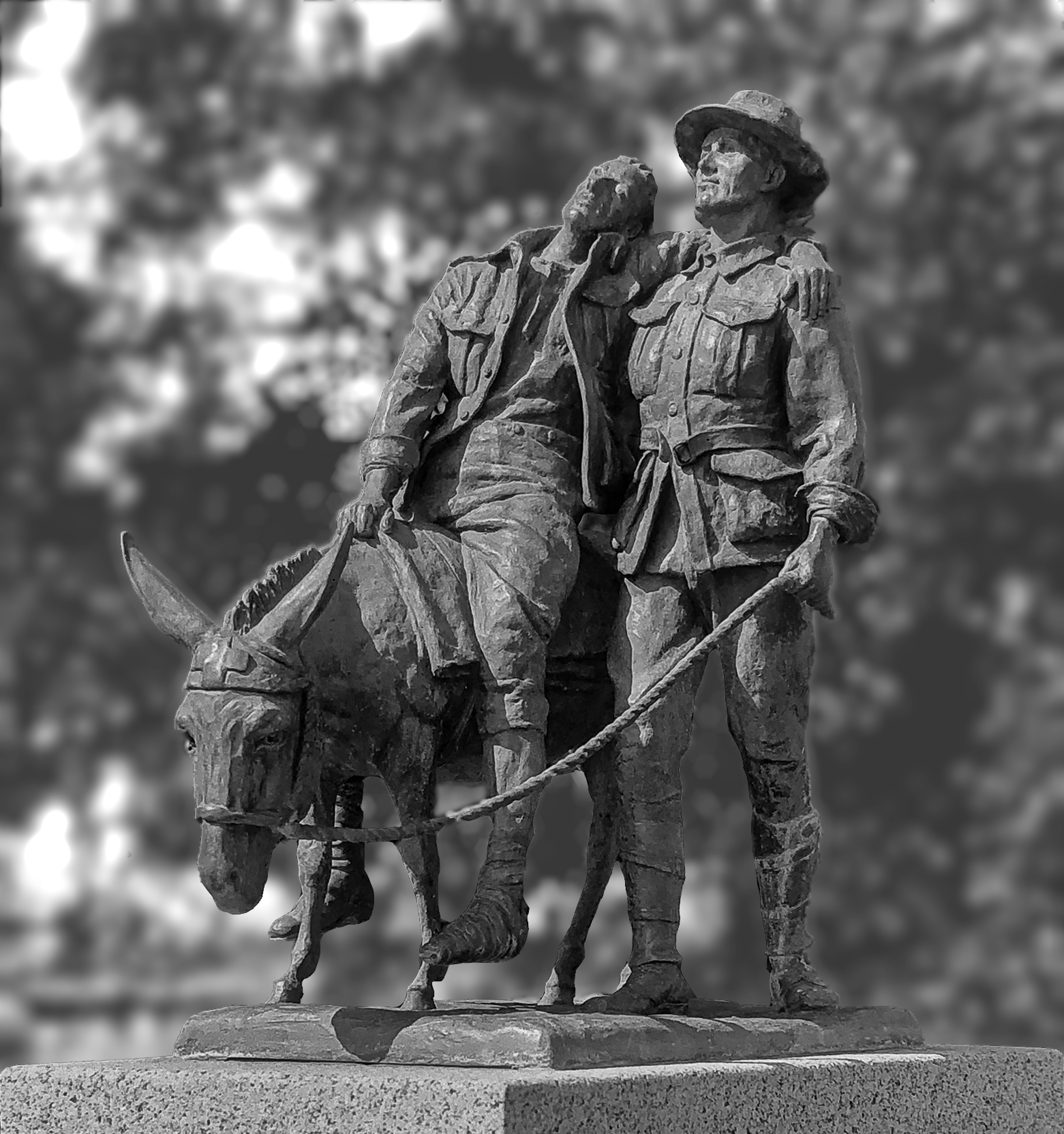
Wallace Anderson (1935) The Man with the Donkey

In 1932 W. Leslie Bowles met with Orlando Dutton, Wallace Anderson, Ola Cohn, George Allen and Charles Oliver, proposing to form a Sculptors’ Society in the hope that commissions could be shared amongst the Society members. The Sculptors’ Society of Australia was duly instituted with Bowles, as Secretary, its only office bearer in a position he held through the life of the Society. The State Library of Victoria holds Ola Cohn’s unpublished manuscript Me in the making which documents the Society’s establishing meeting.

Sydney sculptors Paul Montford and Raynor Hoff, and Daphne Mayo of Brisbane, joined the Society and later the younger professional sculptors, Lyndon Dadswell and Stanley Hammond, also became members. In its next ten years until its demise because of the War, the Society promoted seven competitions for major public sculptures, of which Bowles won four, Hammond two and Anderson one; none of the other members being successful.

== Commissions, exhibitions and awards ==
In April 1933 the first group exhibition of sculpture to be held in Melbourne was organised by members Dutton, Bowles, Anderson, Cohn, George Allen, and Oliver. Arthur Streeton enthusiastically welcomed the exhibition and expressed surprise that Australia, which had a clear atmosphere and a suitable climate to show sculpture to its best advantage, did not make more of it. An illustration of Dutton's plaster maquette of St. George from the show was published in Art in Australia in December that year.

Members of the Society, were active from the mid-1930s in entering sculpture awards; the Melbourne City Council competition for sculpture to decorate the Fitzroy Gardens was won by Leslie Bowles. In December 1935, for the (Sir John) Monash Equestrian Memorial, entries by Montford, Dadswell, Dutton, Hoff, Anderson, Henry Harvey and A. de Bono were exhibited in Melbourne at the new Arts and Crafts Society gallery; the entry by winner, again being Bowles, was not exhibited.

In 1935, with rules set by the Society and auspiced by the Red Cross, another competition was won by Anderson for The Man With The Donkey, installed at the Shrine of Remembrance, Melbourne.
