= Victorian Sculptors' Society =

1948 arts organisation in Victoria, Australia

The Victorian Sculptors' Society was an arts organisation formed in Victoria, Australia in 1948.

== History ==
The society had two predecessors:

- The Yarra Sculptors' Society was founded in 1898 by Margaret Baskerville and her husband Douglas Richardson. Prominent members included Web Gilbert, William Scurry, and wood carvers H. F. Dunne and Mortimer Godfrey, who created the Gog and Magog figures attending the clock in the Royal Arcade.
- In 1933 the Sculptors' Society of Australia was founded by Leslie Bowles, Ola Cohn, Wallace Anderson and Orlando Dutton. Bowles, as honorary secretary, was diligent in soliciting contracts for Australian sculptors on the occasions of Melbourne's centenary and memorials to George V.

In 1948 the Victorian Sculptors' Society was founded.

They organised a special exhibition at the National Gallery of Victoria in 1958, and later a travelling exhibition, visiting country centres. The society held exhibitions at the Victorian Artists Society (VAS) galleries from 1948. The society was disbanded in 1969.

Presidents

- 1951 Victor Greenhalgh
- 1952 George Allen
- 1953 Stanley Hammond (sculptor)
- 1954 Ray Ewers
- 1955–1956 Andor Mészáros
- 1957 Stanley Hammond
- 1958–1959 Jeffery Wilkinson
- 1960–1961 Lenton Parr
- 1962–1963 Andor Mészáros
- 1964–65 Ken Scarlett
- 1966–1969 Charles Miller

== Successor ==
The Association of Sculptors of Victoria was founded in 1971 and held annual exhibitions at the VAS.

Presidents

- 1971: Charles Miller
- Stanley Hammond
- Michael Meszaros
- Karl Duldig
- 1979: Ernest Fries

Hon. Secretary

- 1980 John M. Davies
