= Charles Douglas Richardson =

English-born Australian sculptor and painter

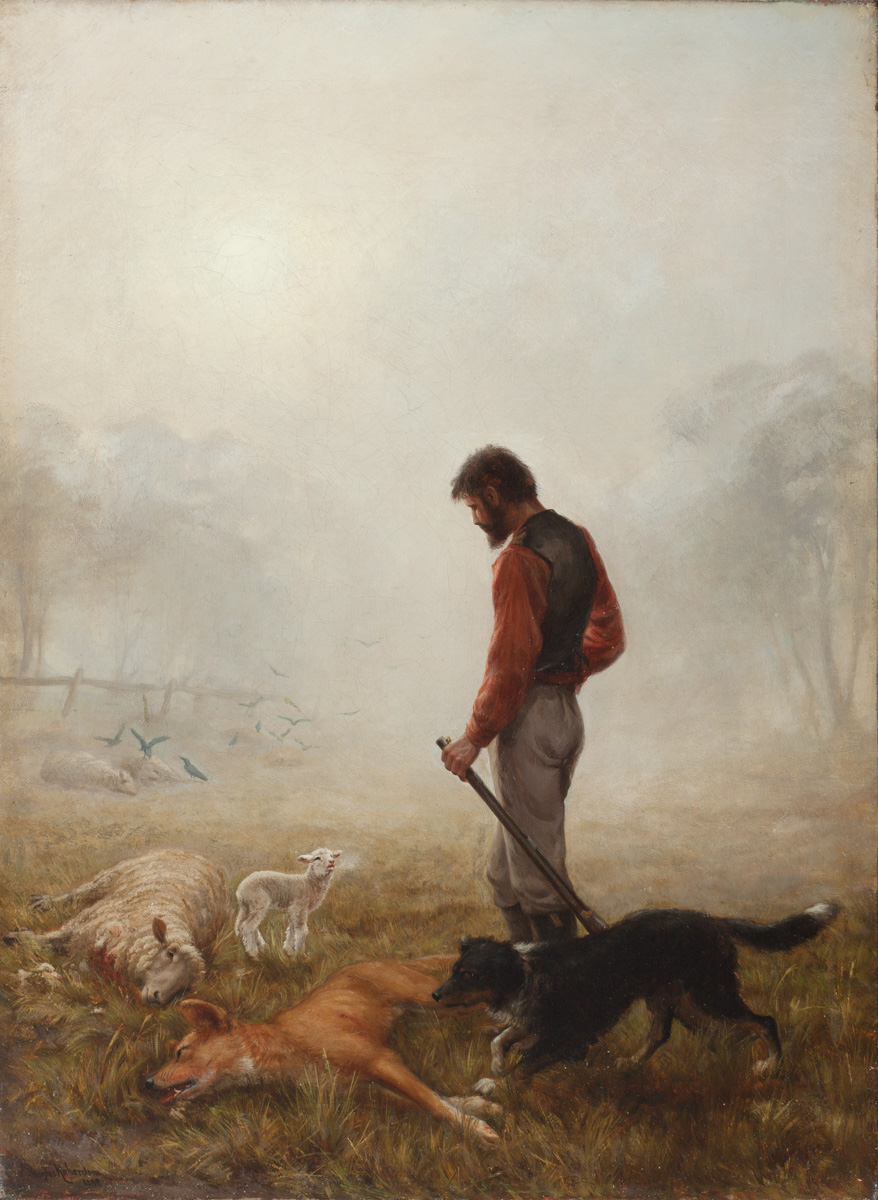
The Last of the Flock: An Incident in Australia, 1882

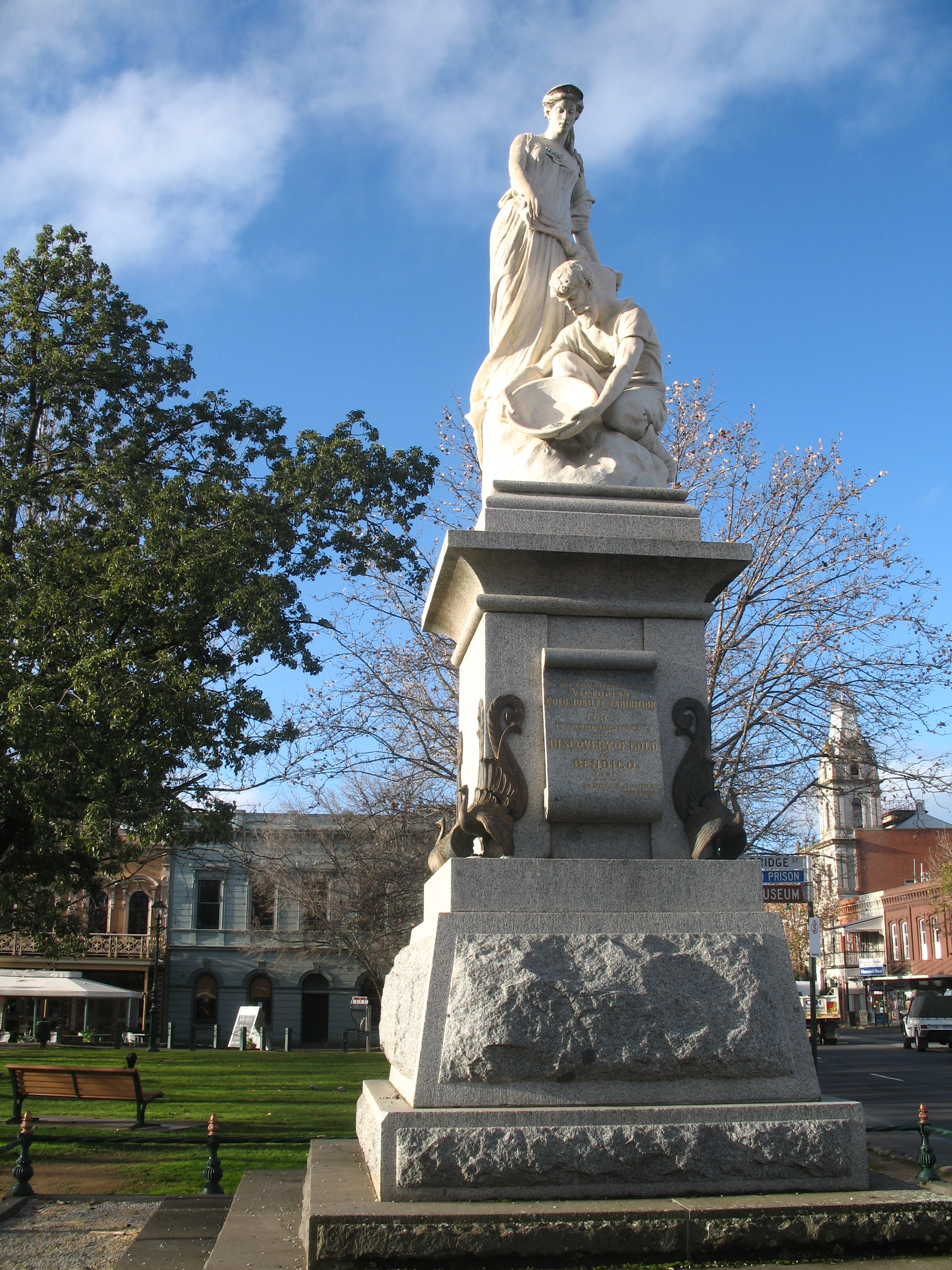
Discovery of Gold statue, Bendigo, designed by Richardson and completed in 1906

Charles Douglas Richardson (7 or 9 July 1853 – 15 October 1932), often referred to as C. Douglas Richardson, was an English-born Australian sculptor and painter. In the 1880s, he was an associate of the Heidelberg School of impressionists, and contributed works to the landmark 9 by 5 Impression Exhibition of 1889.

== History ==
Richardson was born in Islington, London, second son of artist John Richardson (1853–1932) and his wife Mary Frances, née Holmes. In 1858 the family left aboard the ship Swiftsure for Victoria, Australia, where the eldest son Rev. Thomas Elliott Richardson (1814–1869) was a Presbyterian minister and editor of the Portland Guardian from 1854 (or earlier) to 1863.

== Training ==
He was educated at Scotch College, where his interest in sketching was encouraged, then trained at the Artisans' School of Design, Trades Hall, Melbourne and later the National Gallery School, Melbourne. In 1881 he left for London, studying at the Royal Academy schools for six years, for a time sharing studios with fellow students from Melbourne, Tom Roberts and Bertram Mackennal. He returned to Melbourne in 1889, working in various media as well as oils and watercolours.

Richardson was regarded as one of the most important artists of his generation in Melbourne during the late 1880s and the 1890s. He was discussed by critics as the equal of such artists as Tom Roberts, Arthur Streeton and Frederick McCubbin. Richardson's works were read as synonymous with the new nationalist school of plein air painters. At c. 1890, Richardson was a close associate of these artists, both personally and professionally. He showed both sculpted and painted "impressions" at the famed 9 by 5 Impression Exhibition, Melbourne August 1889, regarded as one of Australia's first modernist group shows with a manifesto. In 1880 he was a ringleader alongside Tom Roberts of student protests at the National Gallery school.

He was a co-founder in 1898 of the Yarra Sculptors' Society, along with Margaret Baskerville and Web Gilbert.

== Presidency of Victorian Artists' Society ==
Richardson joined the Victorian Artists' Society soon after his return to Australia in 1889. In 1918 he was elected president of the Society, following dissatisfaction with his predecessor Max Meldrum and his very vocal core of supporters. He retained the position until succeeded by John Longstaff in 1925, and was elected again a year later, to be replaced by Paul Montford in 1931. Although one of the longest serving presidents, Richardson is little remembered by that group.

Richardson's reputation has diminished amongst subsequent curators, critics and historians, partly because relatively few of the significant and highly regarded works that he was known to have produced came on the market, partly because his interest in symbolism and the British New Sculpture movement did not speak to the social realist values that were read into the plein air group by many later commentators. He is now read as a curious adjunct to the plein air school of painters known as the Heidelberg School rather than the core figure that he once was.

== Marriage ==
In 1914 he married the sculptor Margaret Baskerville, one of the most influential Australian women artists prior to Margaret Preston. Baskerville received many commissions but her work lacked the lyrical and poetic qualities of the best of Richardson's works.

A recent bronze casting of his female figure, The Cloud, was set into a formal water garden beside the former Brighton Town Hall (Victoria, Australia) in the 1980s.
