= Ola Cohn =

Australian artist, sculptor (1892–1964)

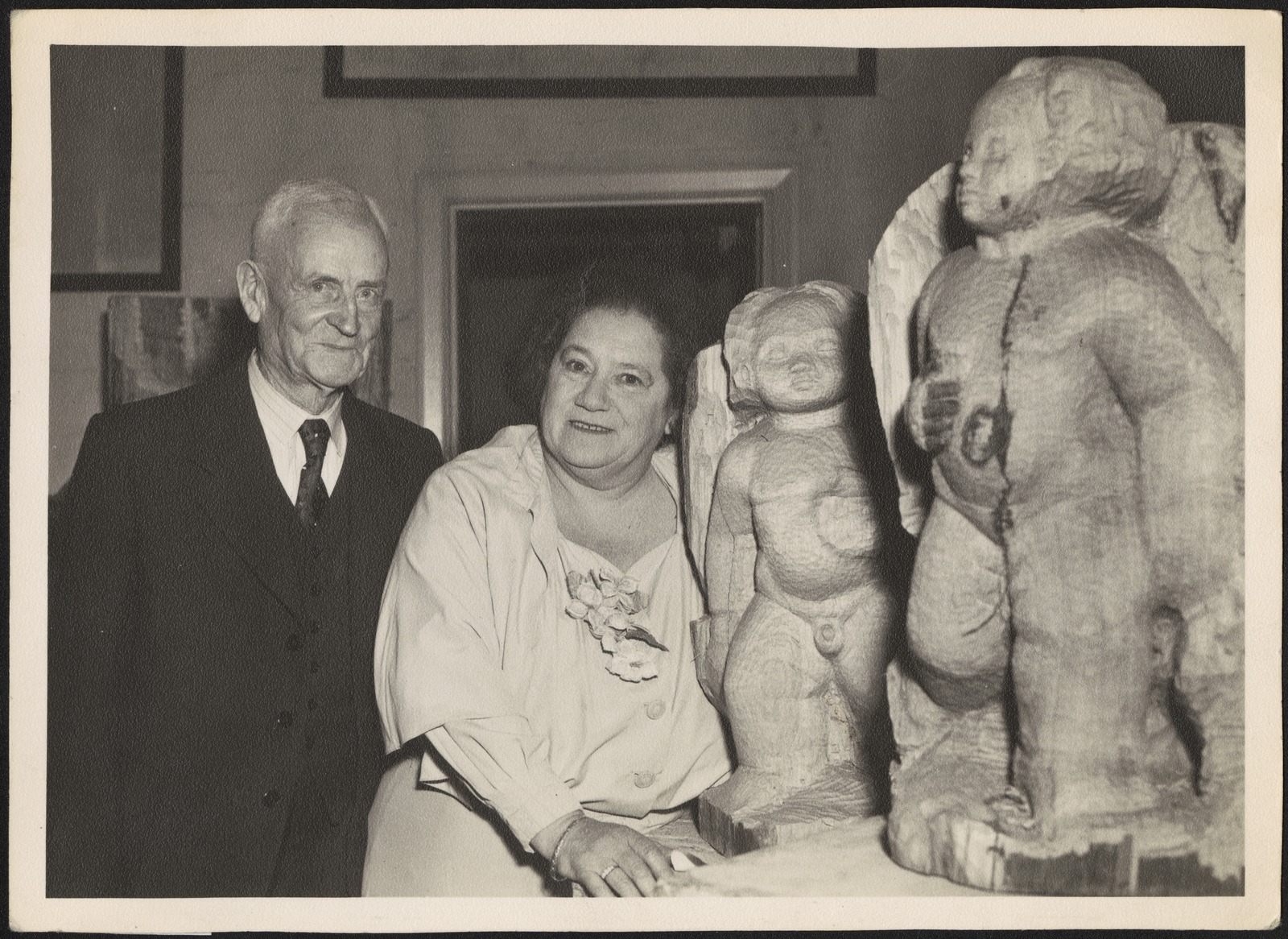
- Pictures Collection, State Library Victoria
- Born: Carola Cohn; 25 April 1892; Bendigo, Victoria, Australia
- Died: 23 December 1964 (aged 72); Cowes, Victoria, Australia
- Education: Swinburne Technical College, Royal College of Art in London under Ernest Cole and Henry Moore
- Known for: Sculpture
- Notable work: Fairies' Tree, Head of a Virgin, Abraham, statue in Adelaide Pioneer Women's Garden
- Movement: Modernist
- Awards: Crouch Prize (1952), MBE

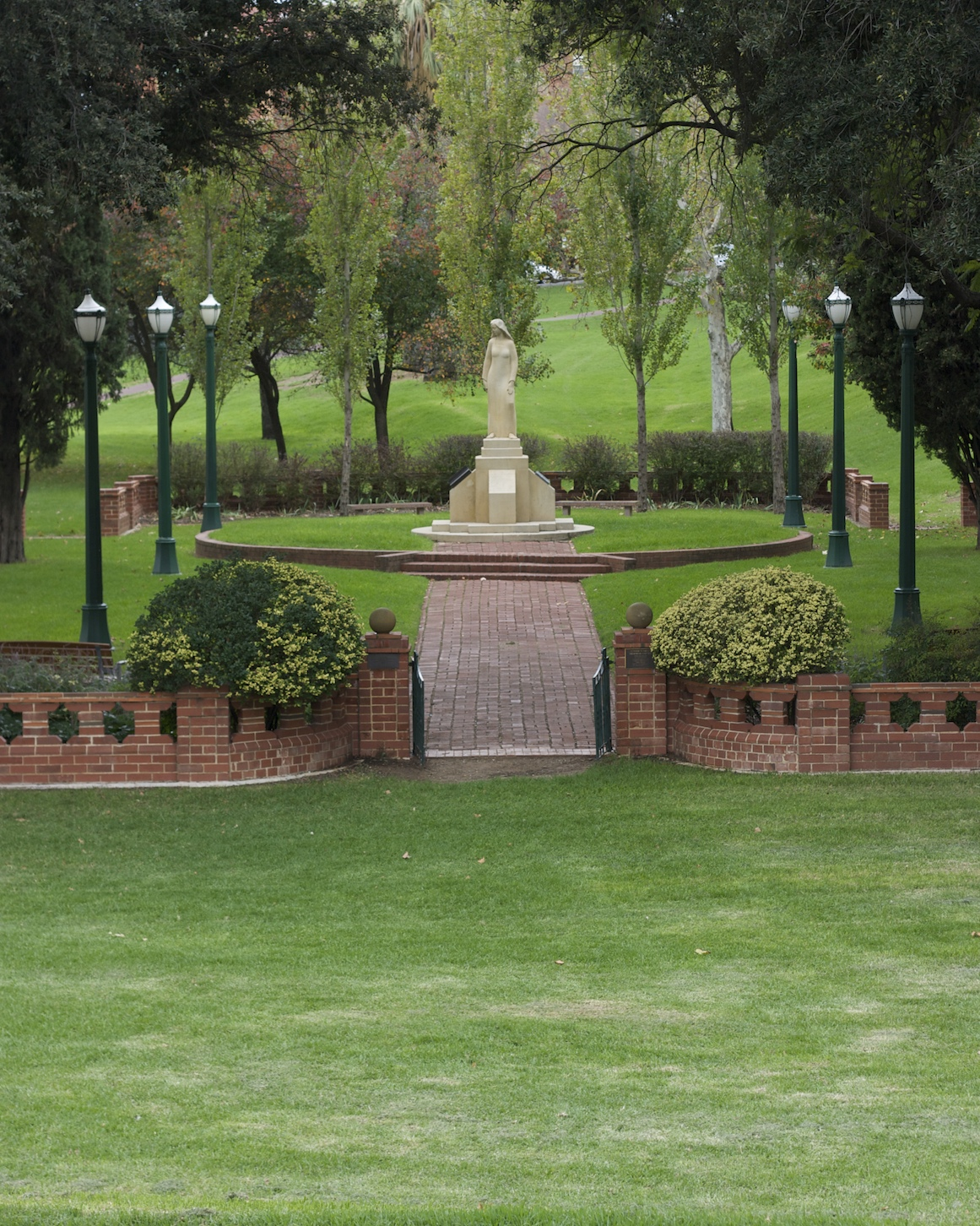
Cohn's statue in the Pioneer Women's Memorial Garden, Adelaide.

Ola Cohn (born Carola Cohn; 25 April 1892 – 23 December 1964) was an Australian artist, author and philanthropist best known for her work in sculpture in a modernist style, and famous for her Fairies Tree in the Fitzroy Gardens, Melbourne.

== Early life ==
Cohn was born in Bendigo, Victoria. She went to school at Girton College in Bendigo and then studied drawing and sculpture at the Bendigo School of Mines. She continued her studies in Melbourne at Swinburne Technical College and then at the Royal College of Art in London. On her return to Melbourne in 1930 she established a studio at Grosvenor Chambers (9 Collins Street, Melbourne, subsequently occupied by Georges and Mirka Mora), later moving to Gipps Street, East Melbourne.

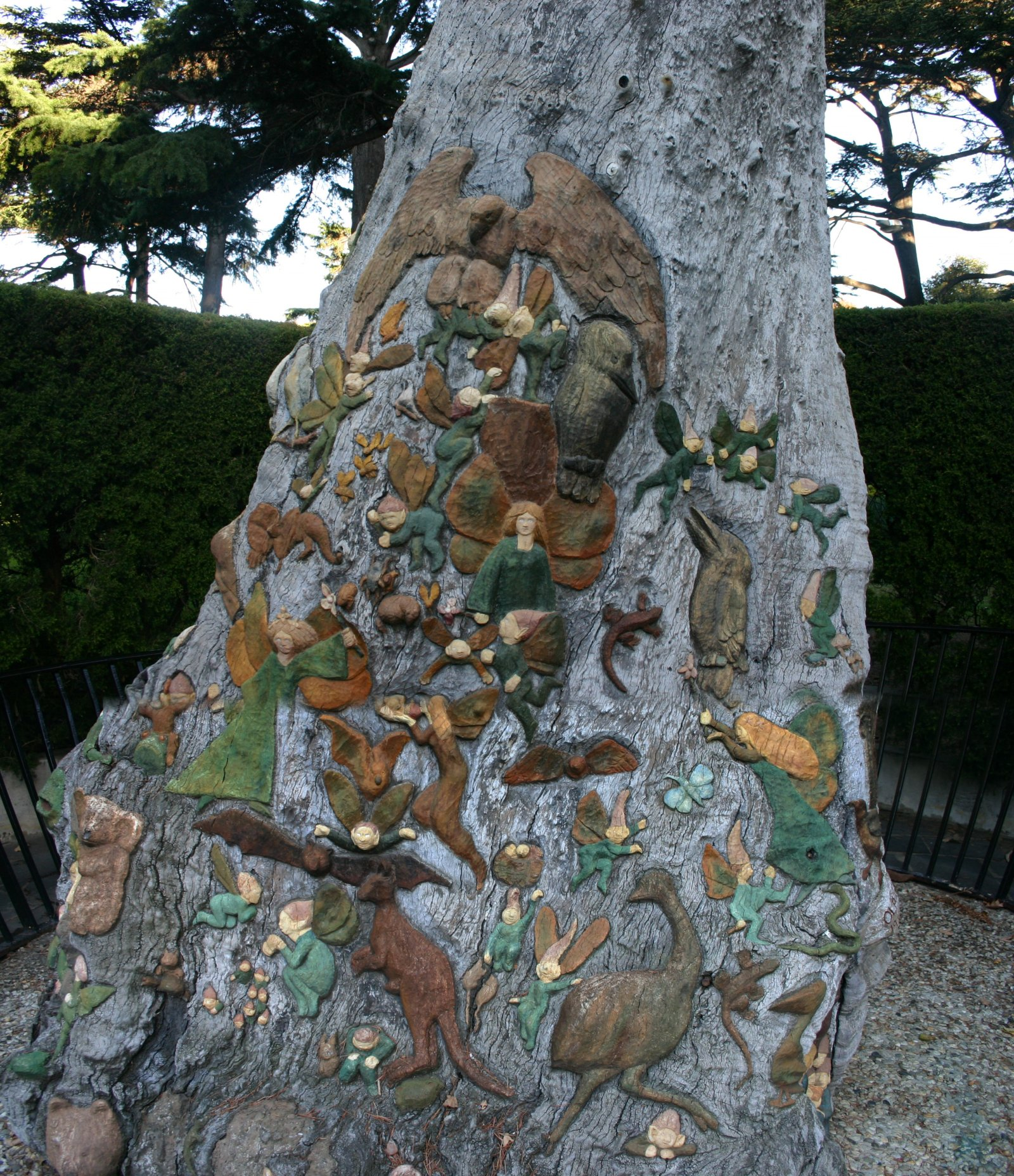
Fairies Tree in Fitzroy Gardens

== Works ==
Cohn's works in bronze, stone and wood are held in many state and regional galleries. Important works include:

- the Fairies' Tree in the Fitzroy Gardens, Melbourne which she sculpted between 1931 and 1934 and donated to the children of Melbourne and
- the statue for the Pioneer Women's Memorial Garden in Adelaide, South Australia, carved in limestone in 1940–1941.

The Fairies Tree work also inspired her writing and publication of The Fairies' Tree (1932), More about the Fairies' Tree (1933) and Castles in the Air (1936). Her book Mostly Cats was published in 1964. In 2014 her autobiography was published; A Way with the Fairies: The Lost Story of Sculptor Ola Cohn.

== Career and influence ==
She was president of the Melbourne Society of Women Painters and Sculptors from 1948 to 1964, a founding member of the Australian Sculptors Society and an active member of the Victorian Artists' Society, the Victorian Sculptors' Society and Melbourne Contemporary Artists.

Through her membership of artists' and sculptors' societies, Cohn gave lectures and demonstrations to make sculpture more accessible to the public. Private instruction in sculpture was given from her studio in East Melbourne, which became an important centre for artists. During the Second World War, she gave recreational sculpture lessons for soldiers.

Cohn travelled through Europe and Iceland from 1949 to 1951. In 1952, she won the Crouch Prize at Ballarat for her woodcarving, "Abraham". This was the first time that the prize had been awarded to a sculpture.

Her studio home in Gipps Street, East Melbourne, was bequeathed to the Council of Adult Education (since renamed the Centre for Adult Education) and is now known as the Ola Cohn Memorial Centre.

In 2002, the Centre for Adult Education considered selling Cohn's studio to raise money for new buildings. A public campaign at the time motivated the Victorian state government to intercede and fund the restoration of the Ola Cohn Memorial Centre Her studio at Gipps Street is still under the control of the CAE and is heritage listed.

== Honours and awards ==
On 1 January 1965, shortly after her death, Cohn was appointed a Member of the Most Excellent Order of the British Empire for her work in the service of art, especially sculpture. In 2007, she was added to the Victorian Honour Roll of Women.

== Gallery ==
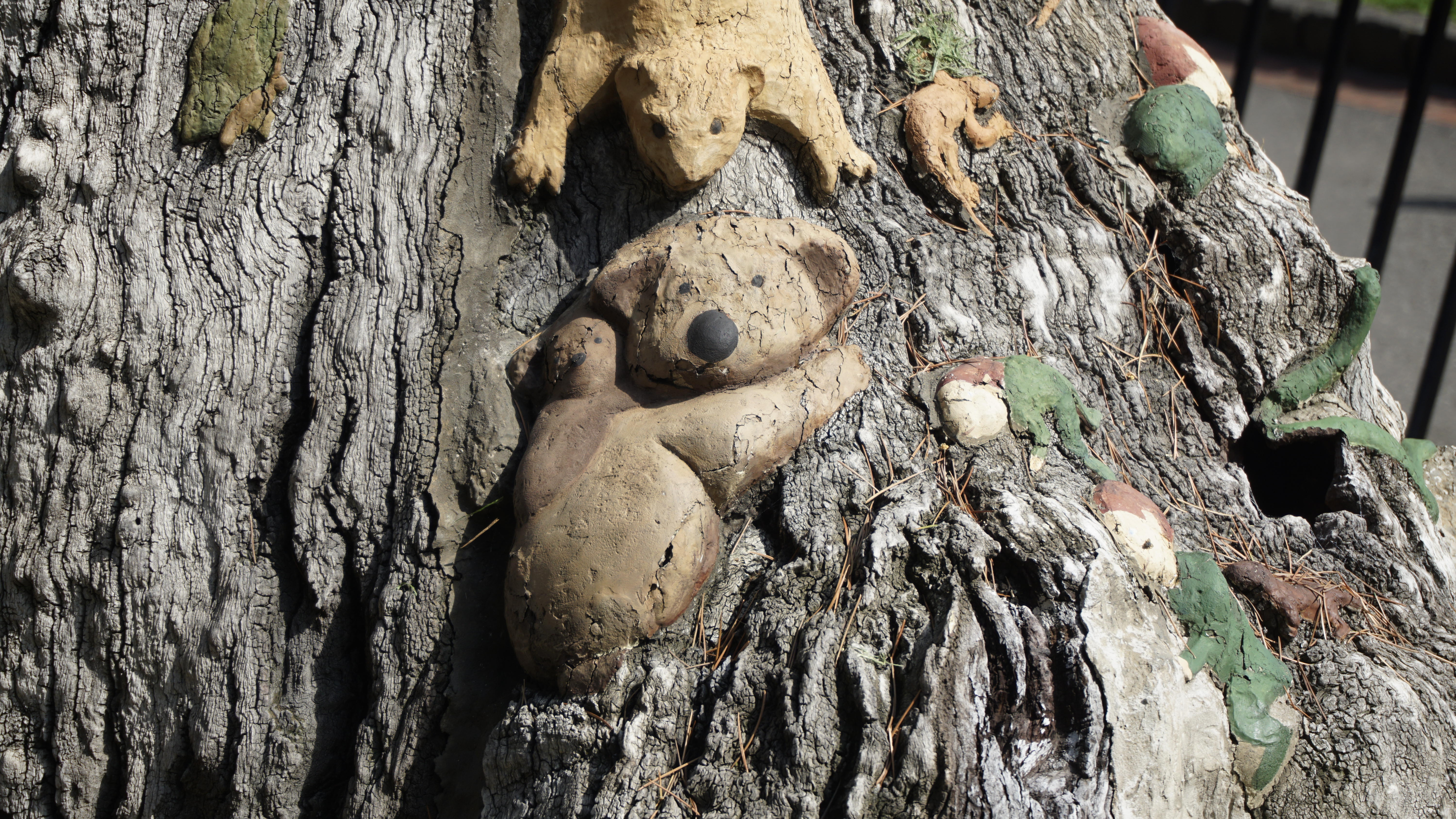

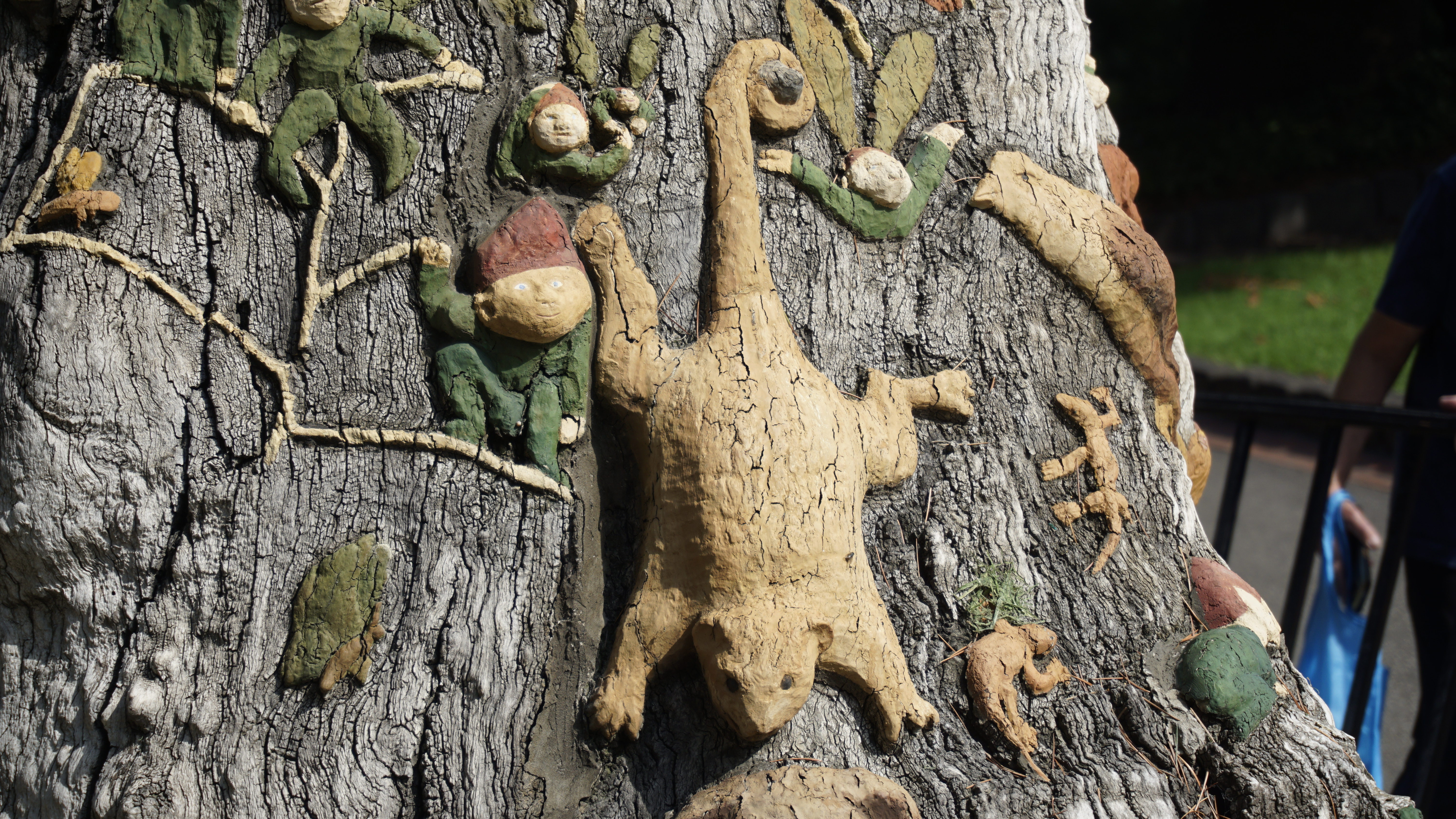

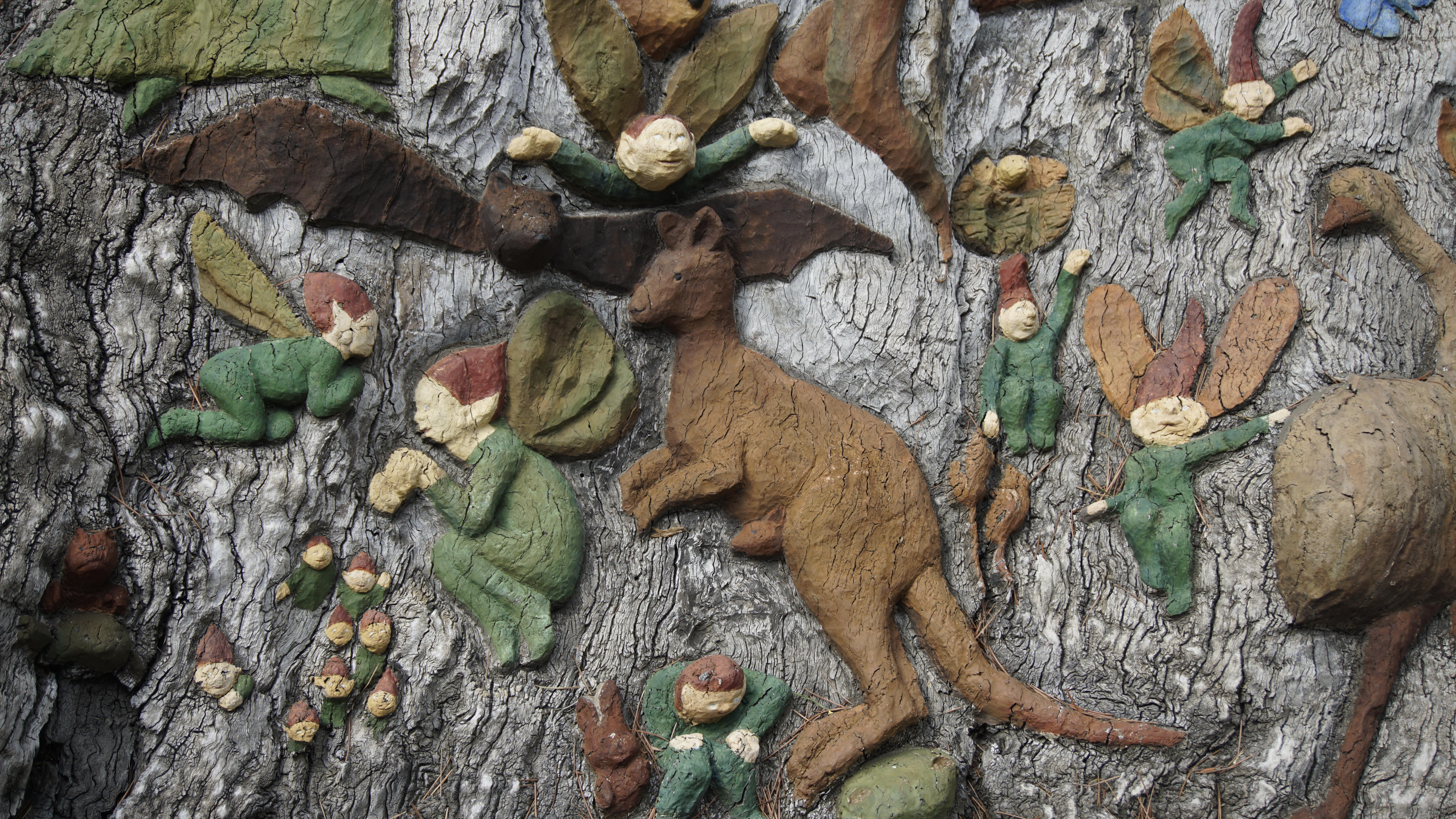

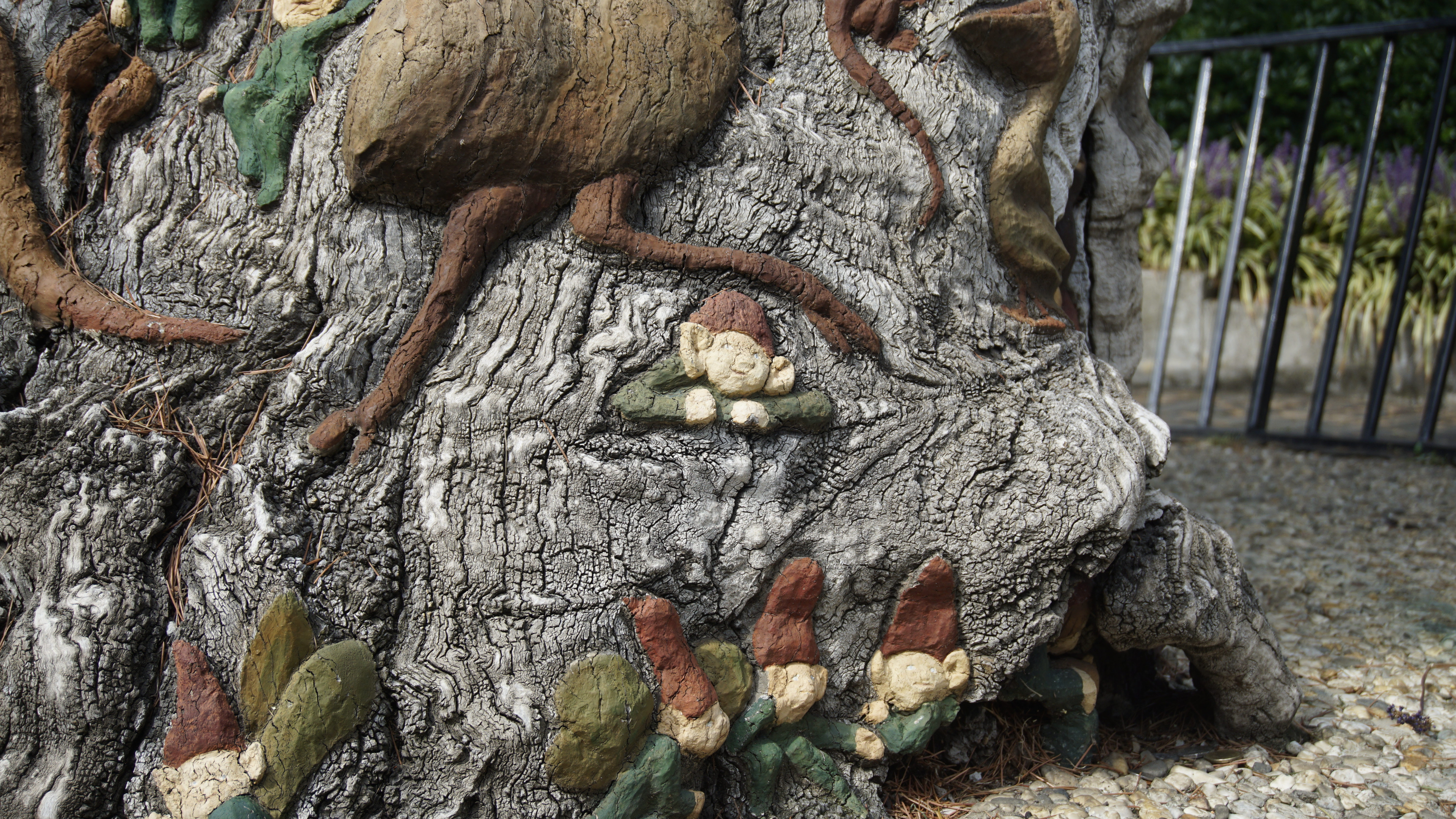

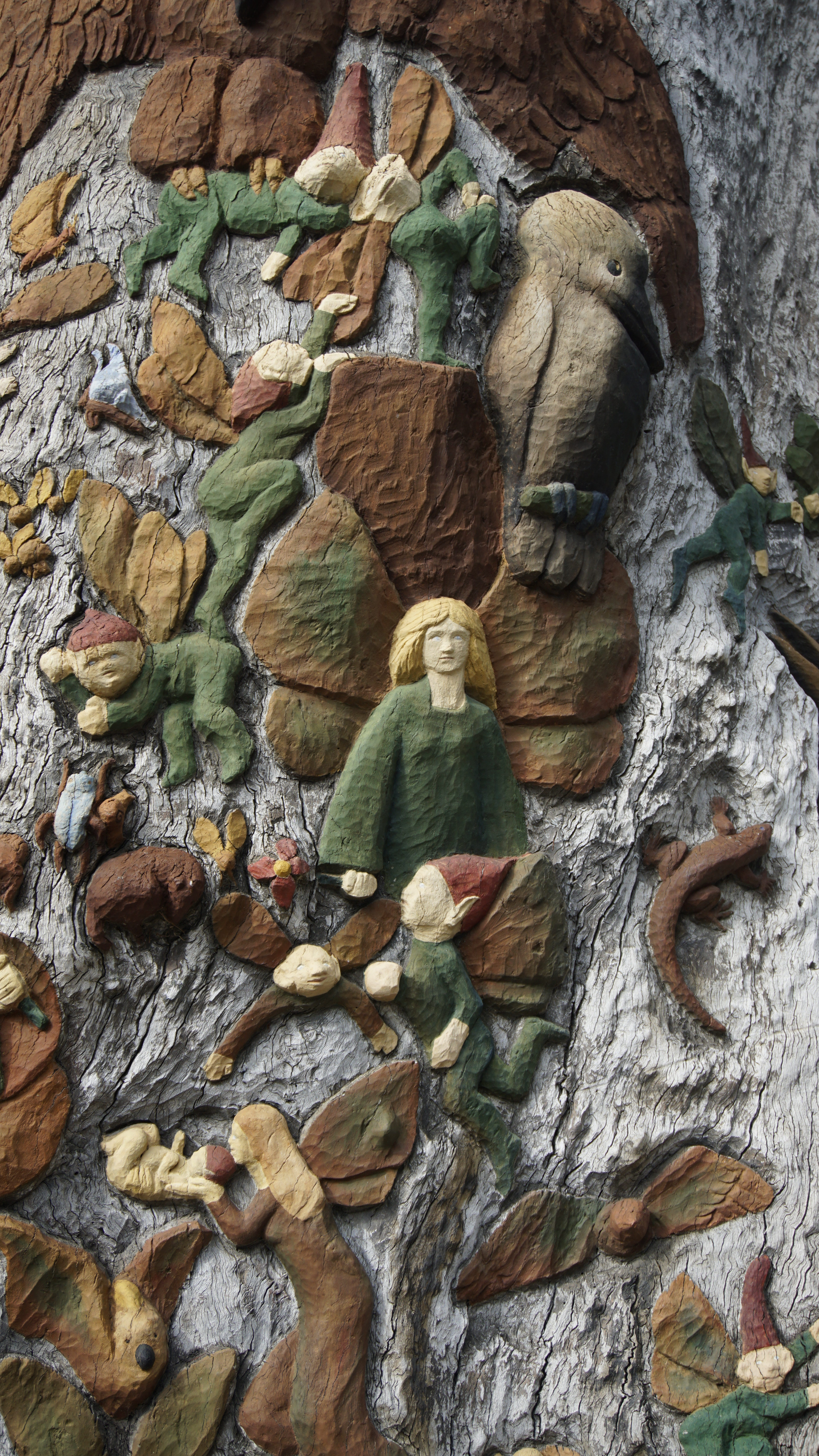

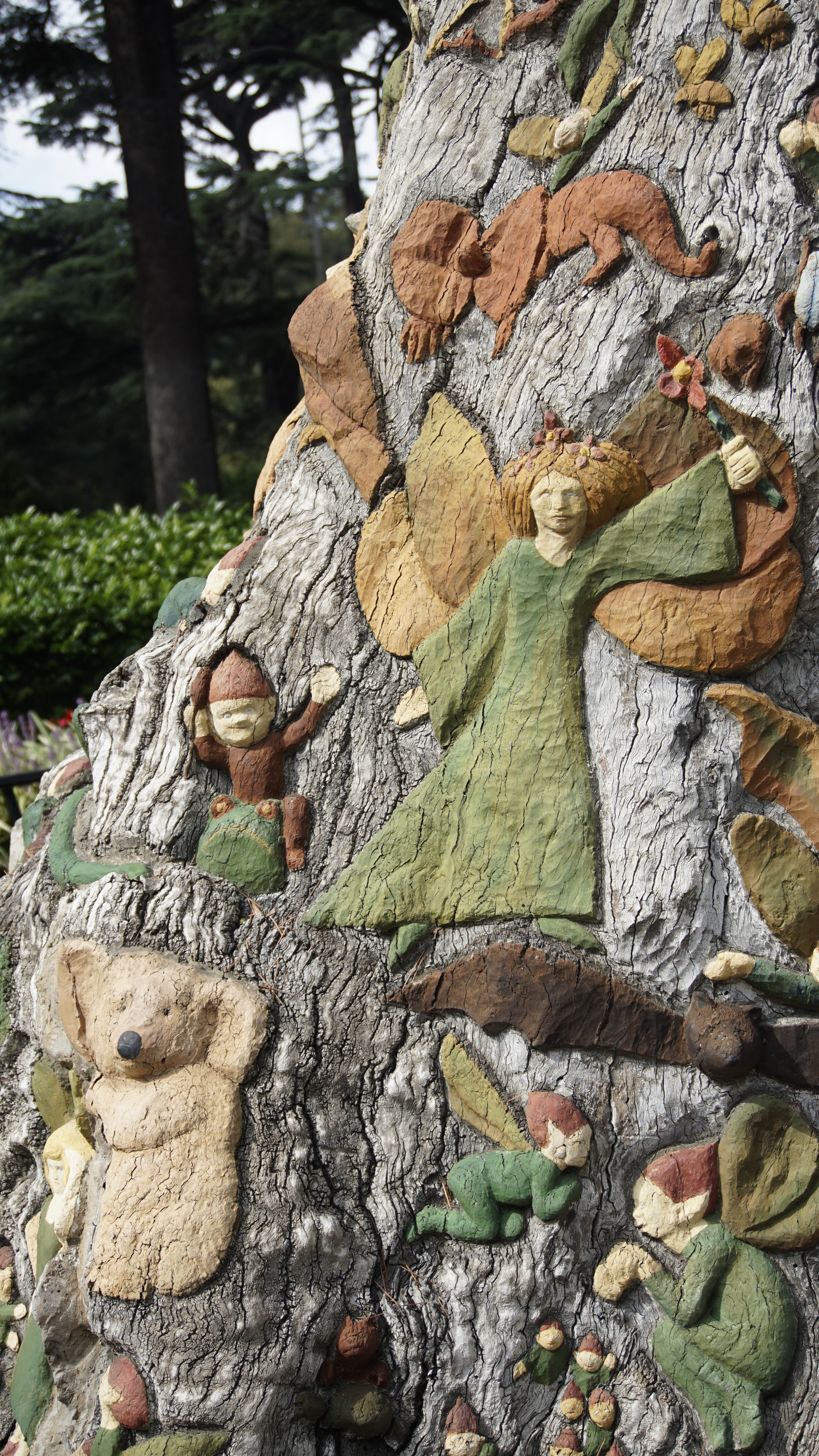

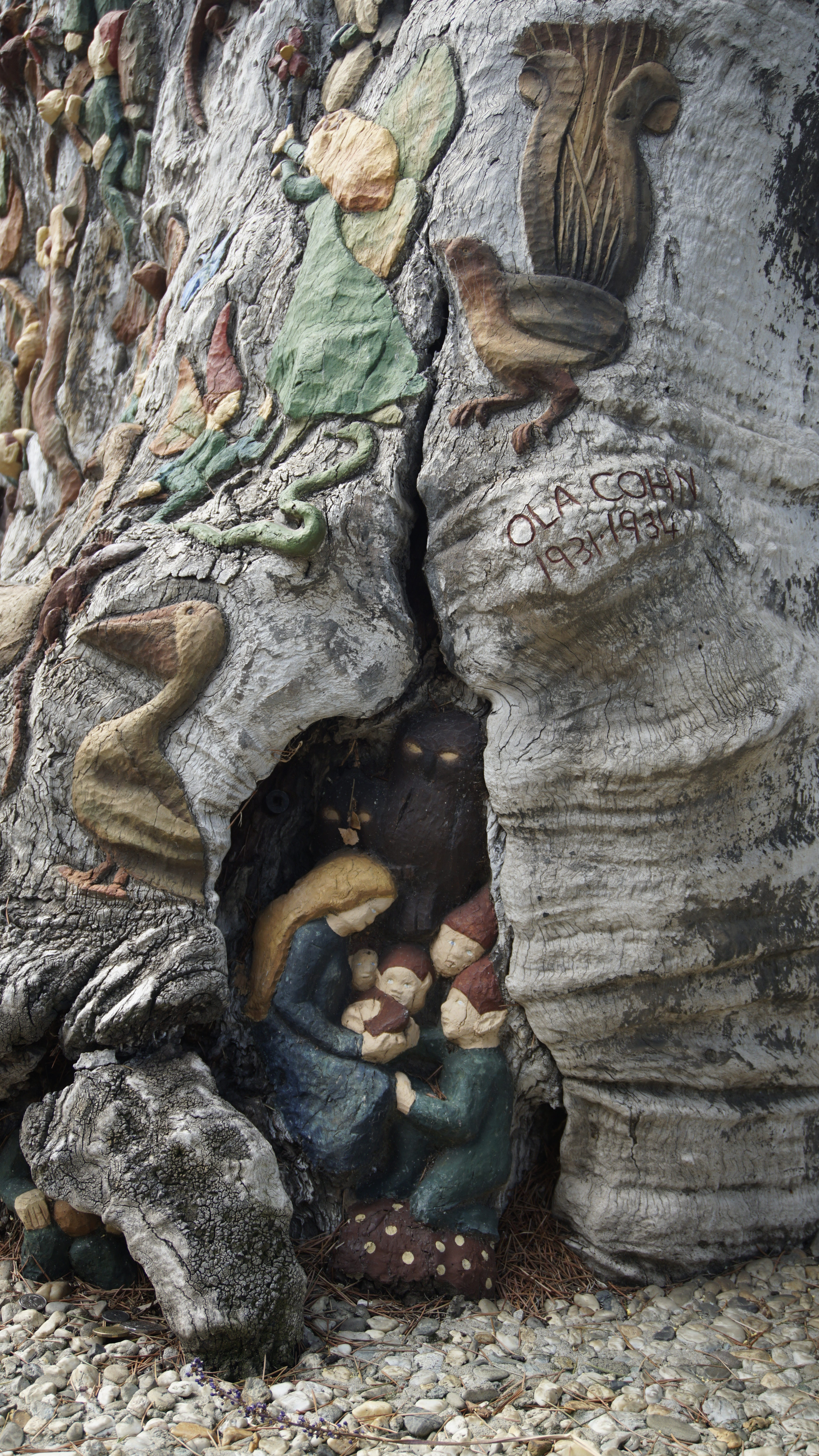

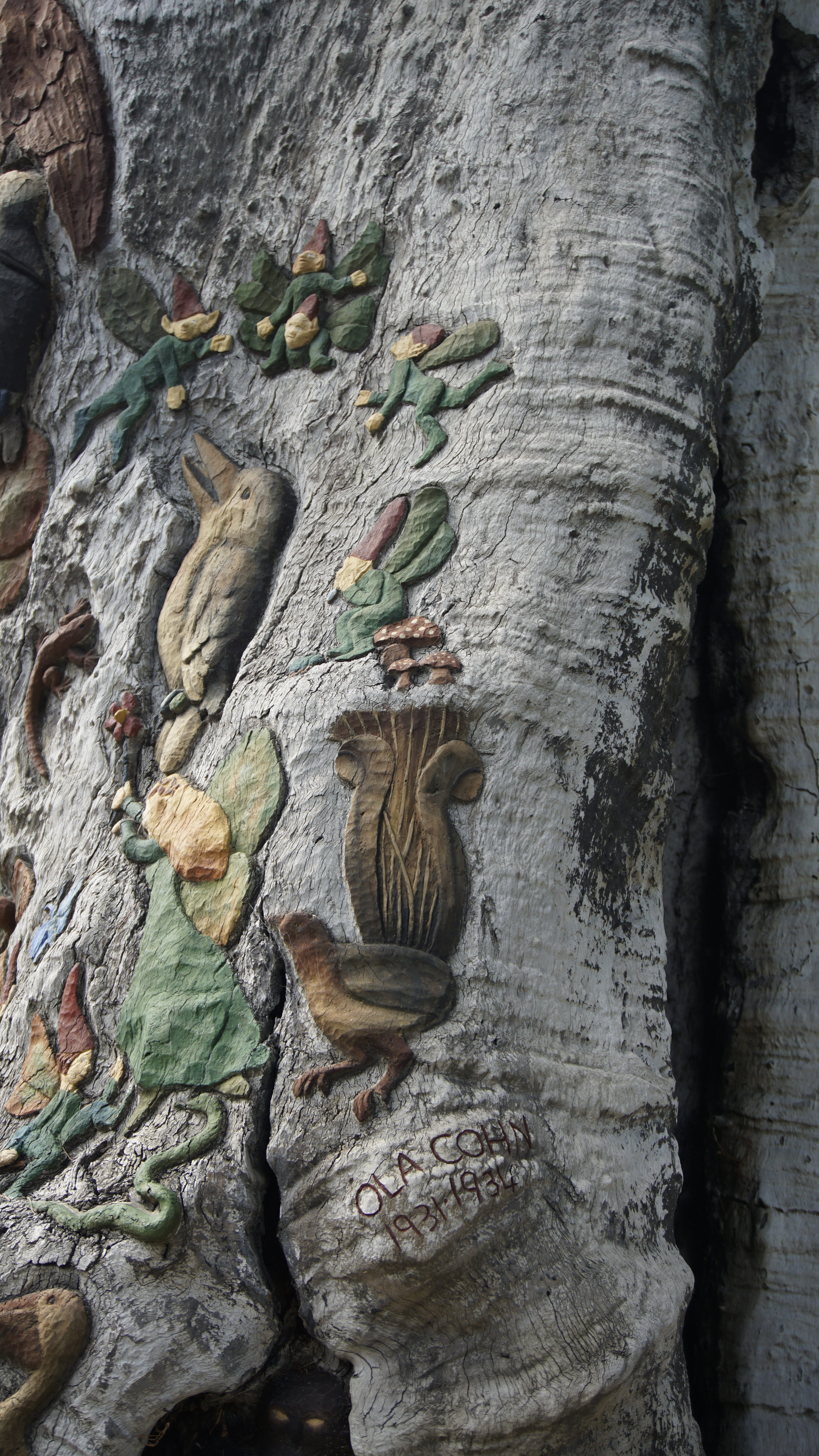
