= Charles Web Gilbert =

Australian sculptor

Charles Marsh Webb (Nash) Gilbert (18 March 1867 – 3 October 1925), known professionally as C. Web Gilbert, was a self-taught Australian sculptor renowned both within Australia and abroad.

Gilbert was born at Cockatoo, a mining and farming hamlet north-east of Talbot, Victoria.

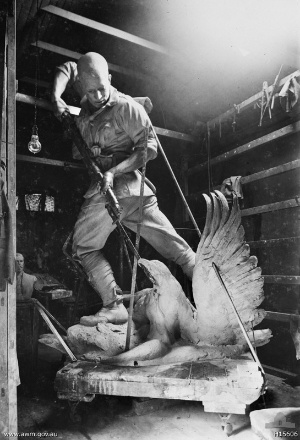
Sculpture for 2nd Division memorial at Mont St Quentin, France

His other war memorials include large and dramatic bronze sculptures of Australian soldiers in public streets in Broken Hill in New South Wales and the City of Burnside in South Australia, as well as those for the Melbourne University medical school and the Victorian Chamber of Manufacturers. He created the miniature figures in the diorama "Mont St Quentin" held by the Australian War Memorial. He married Alice Rose Eugenia Daniell in 1887, they divorced in 1911. He married again while in London and left a widow, Mabel Annette Gilbert, née Woodstock, with three children, daughter Marj, and identical twin sons, Charlie and Jim.

Gilbert is buried at Coburg Cemetery, Preston, Victoria. His grave is included in a self-guided heritage walk at the cemetery and information about his life and death are available on a sign posted at his graveside.

== See also ==
- Australian official war artists

== Bibliography ==
- Serle, Percival (1949). "Gilbert, Charles Web". Dictionary of Australian Biography. Sydney: Angus & Robertson.
- G. Sturgeon (1983). "Charles Marsh Web (Nash) Gilbert (1867–1925)". Australian Dictionary of Biography: 'Gilbert, Charles Marsh Web (Nash) (1867–1925)'. National Centre of Biography, Australian National University.
