= Norma Redpath =

Australian sculptor (1928–2013)

Norma Redpath OBE
- Redpath in 1964, photographed by Mark Strizic
- Born: Norma Redpath; 20 November 1928; Melbourne, Australia
- Died: 12 January 2013 (aged 84)
- Education: Swinburne Technical College and Universita per Stranieri in Perugia
- Known for: Sculpture
- Notable work: Treasury Fountain, Canberra
- Movement: Centre 5
- Awards: OBE

Norma Redpath OBE (20 November 1928 – 12 January 2013) was an Australian sculptor who worked in Italy and Melbourne.

== Early life and education ==
Norma Redpath was born on 20 November 1928.

She studied painting from 1942 to 1948 (with a long break due to illness) at the Swinburne Technical College in Hawthorn, and from 1949 to 1951 sculpture at the Royal Melbourne Institute of Technology, both in Melbourne. Her studies there were largely self-directed, as she found no contemporary sculpture of interest to her in Australia.

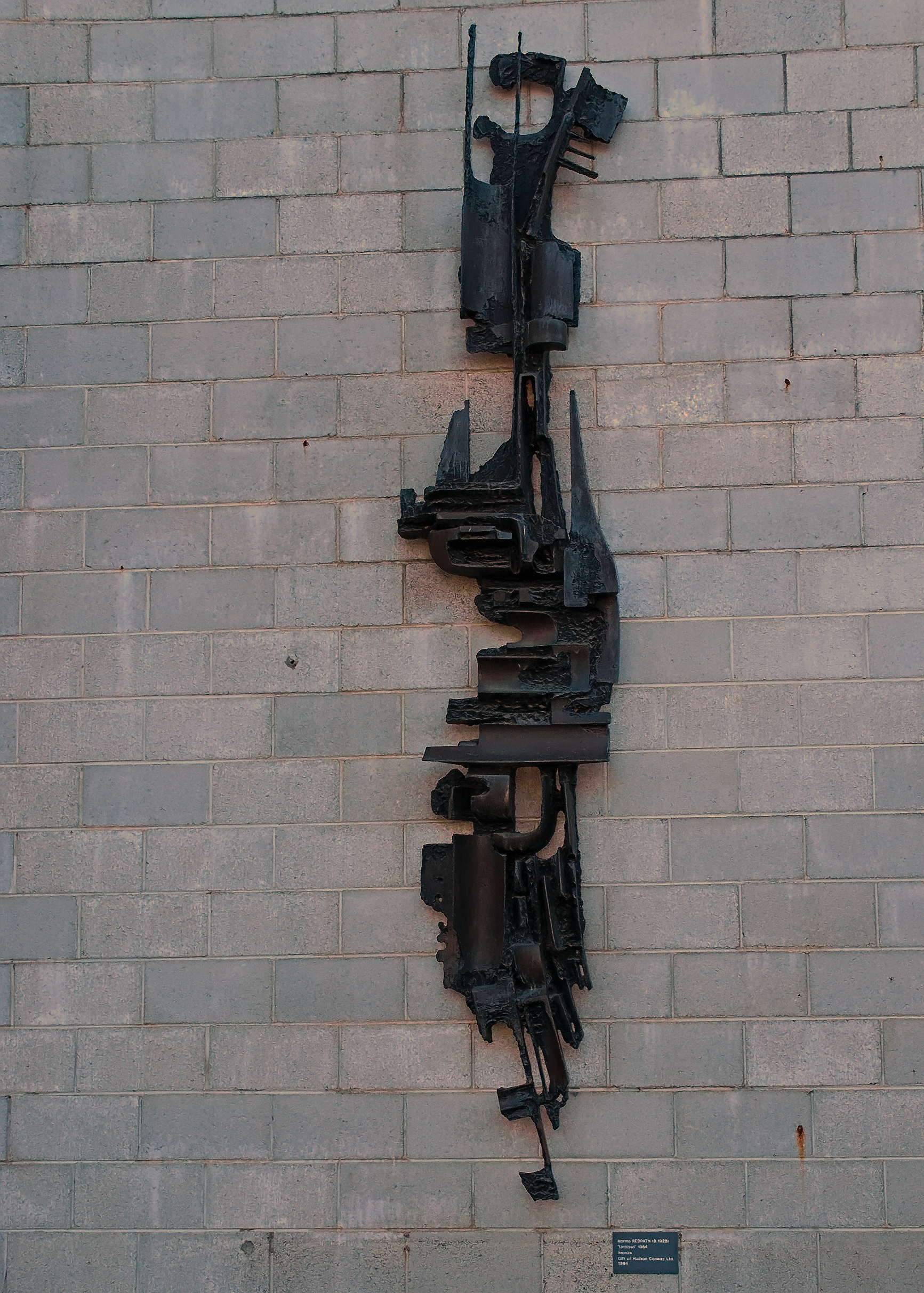
Bronze Relief (1964), at McClelland Sculpture Park

While still a student, she was invited to be a member of the Victorian Sculptors' Society (VSS) (which in late 1967 disbanded, and was reconstituted as the Association of Sculptors of Victoria (ASV)), where she exhibited, and was later vice-president.

== Career ==
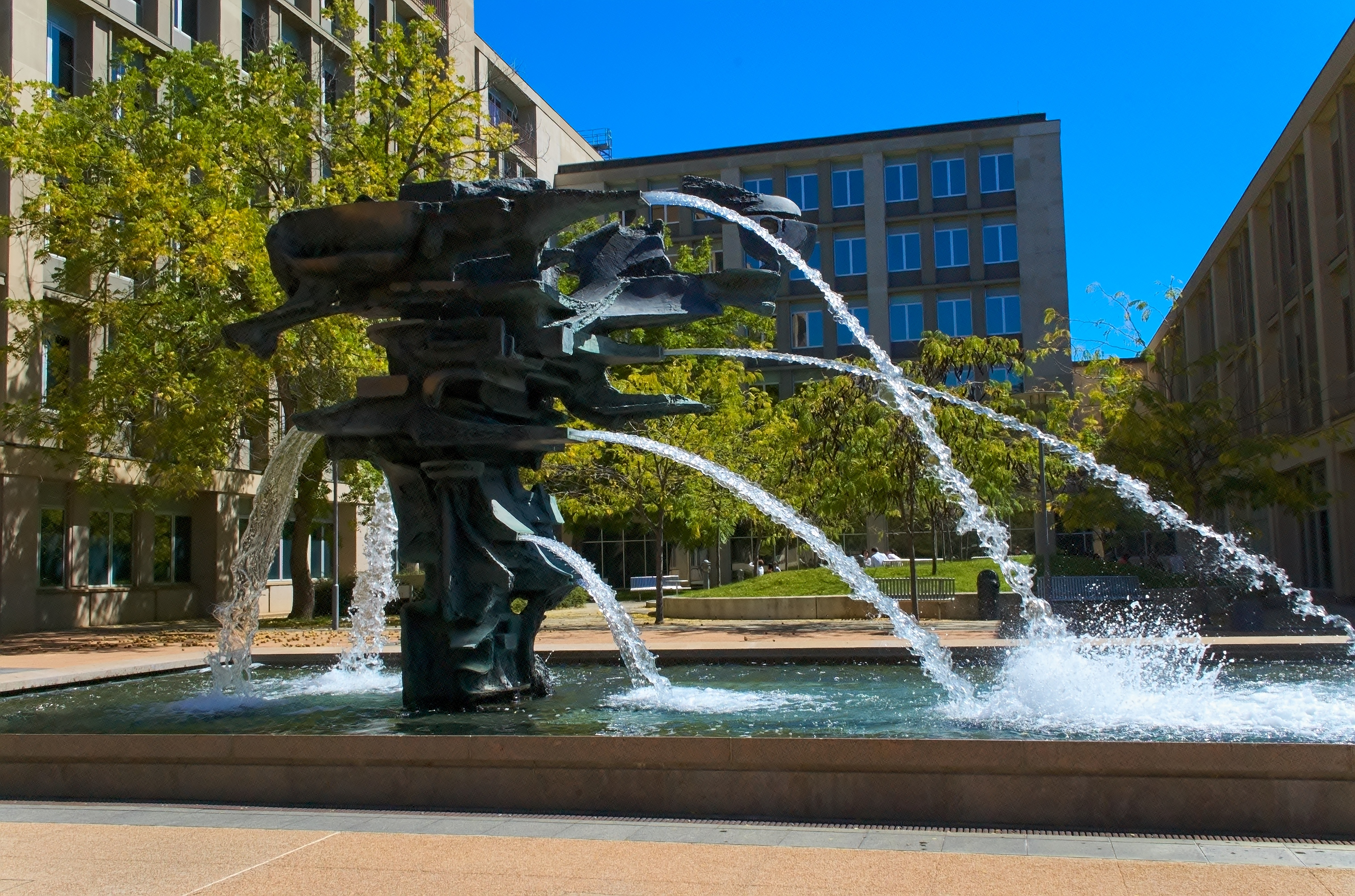
Treasury Fountain (1969), Treasury Building, Canberra

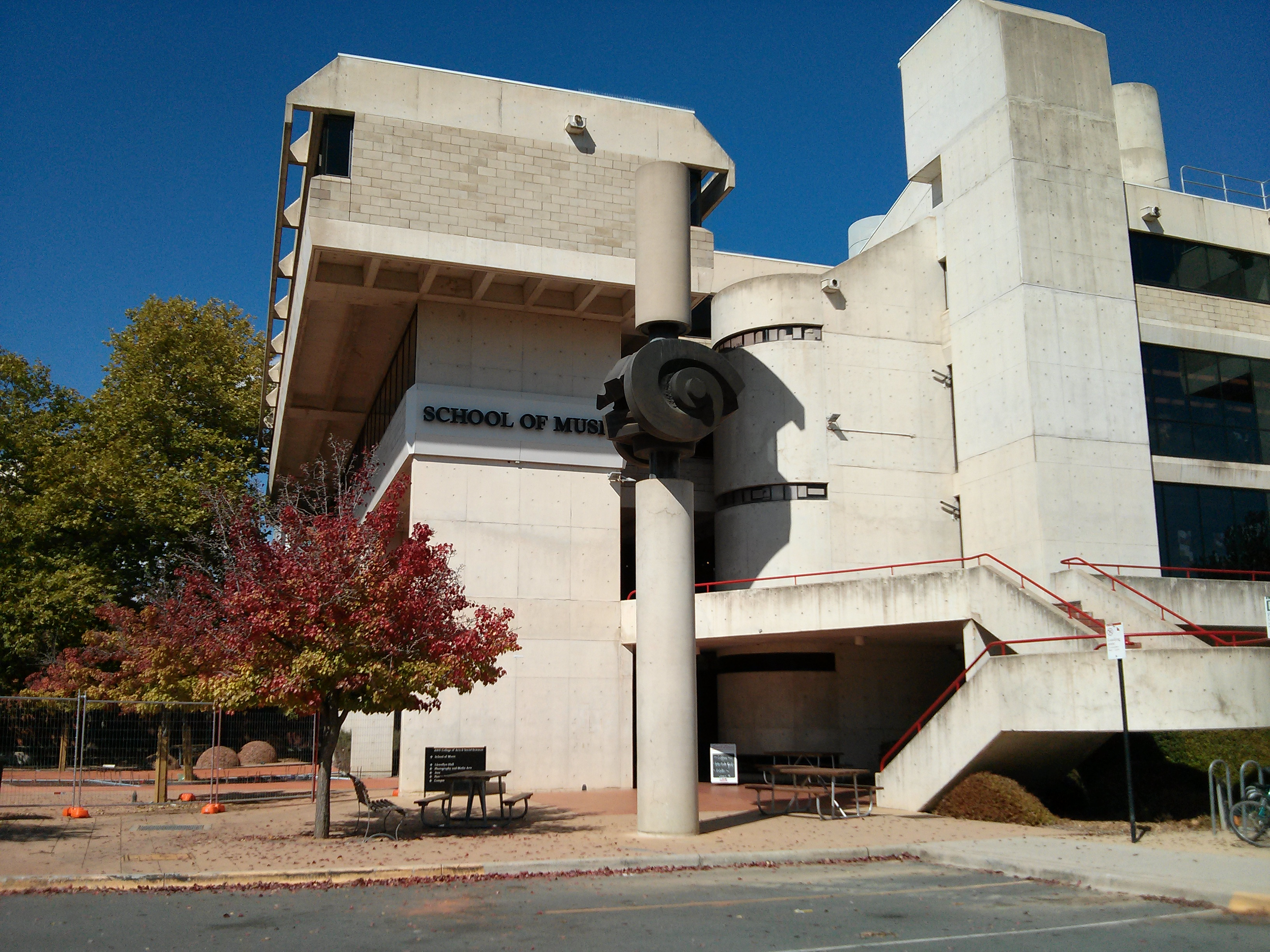
Extended Column (1975), Canberra School of Music

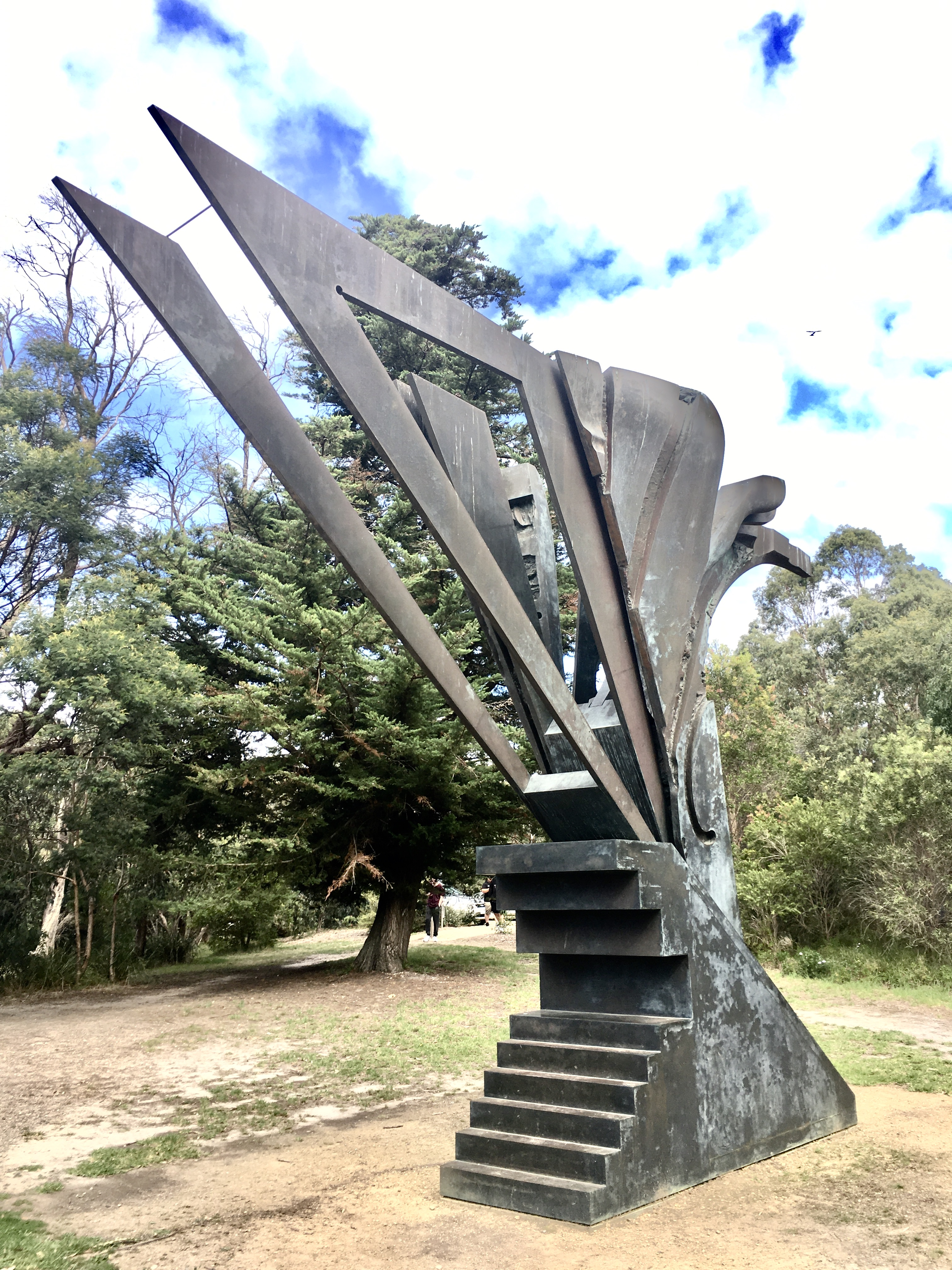
Landscape Caryatide (1985), at McClelland Gallery and Sculpture Park

In 1952, she was teaching at the Korowa Anglican Girls' School and the Melbourne Technical College, and around this time also set up her first self-funded professional sculpture studio.

In 1953 she was a founding member of the "Group of Four" with Inge King, Julius Kane and Clifford Last.

During the 1950s, she travelled to Europe, and studied in Italy from 1956 to 1958 at the Universita per Stranieri in Perugia, developing a love for Italy and Italian art.

In 1958 she returned to Australia to take up a teaching post at the Swinburne Technical College, and became a founding member of the renowned Centre Five group of sculptors in 1959, a group which expanded from the Group of Four to add (among others) Lenton Parr, Vincas Jomantas and Teisutis Zikaras, who broke with the VSS, organised private exhibitions, talks and other publicity promoting the use by architects of modern sculpture. In 1960, she was one of the artists selected for the National Gallery of Victoria's Six Sculptors exhibition, which was the first exhibition of local modernist sculpture by the Gallery.

By 1961 she had decisively turned to bronze, with Dawn figure, a plaster cast envisaged for casting which was awarded the inaugural Mildara (later Mildura) Prize for Sculpture. The same year she won both the Italian Government Travelling Scholarship and the Althea Dyason Bequest travelling scholarship (awarded by the Art Gallery of New South Wales).

In 1962 she pursued her studies at the Accademia di Belle Arti di Brera in Milan, northern Italy, where she would later make a base as she travelled frequently back and forth between Italy and Australia. Sculptures cast there formed the basis of her Gallery A exhibition in Melbourne the following year. One of the sculptures was awarded her second Mildara Prize for Sculpture in 1964, and in 1966 she won the Transfield Prize for Sculpture.

In March 1964 because increasing work commitments in Milan meant she was unable to fully participate, Redpath resigned her membership of Centre Five.

Redpath wrote in her diary in 1965, "To relate sculpture to architecture is a special problem and a great challenge, there is a need to retain the truth of a creative work of art at the same time relating it to special architectural needs..."

In 1968 she returned to Melbourne, establishing her second studio, in the inner-city suburb of Parkville, where she worked on a number of major commissions.

In 1974, while again in Italy, Redpath married Antonio de Altamer, an Italian naval architect. The worked together to refine the technical procedures of the Fonderia Artistica Battaglia and other foundries in the next decade. From the late 1970s she ceased studio work, instead describing her sculptural ideas in a manuscript, Ideas and Images.

From 1974 to 1985 she lived and worked alternately in her Milanese studio and Melbourne, and from 1985 she returned to Australia with her husband and set up her third Australian sculpture studio, this time in Carlton. Her last show was at the Heide Museum of Modern Art, in 2000.

== Recognition ==
In 1970 Redpath was appointed an Officer of the Order of the British Empire for services to contemporary sculpture.

In 2006 she was awarded an honorary doctorate from her old college, now Swinburne University.

== Later life and legacy ==
Redpath's husband died in 2000, the same year as her last show.

After a long illness, she died in Melbourne in 2013, aged 84.

Her Carlton studio and home is owned by the University of Melbourne, and is now available to artists and academics. It is managed by the Faculty of Fine Arts and Music, and is open to selected international visiting artists. Residencies of varying lengths of time are offered to artists, writers and researchers to develop new work as well as engage with the local workers in related fields.

== Selected works ==
- Areopagitica (1958), Baillieu Library, University of Melbourne
- Bronze Reliefs (1964), BP Administration Building, Crib Point, Victoria – relocated to BP building South Melbourne, relocated again to the McClelland Gallery and Sculpture Park in 1997. (image and details)
- Treasury Fountain (1965–1969), Treasury Building, Canberra (ACT) – a two-piece bronze fountain in a rectangular granite pond.
- Victoria Coats of Arms (1968), above entrance, National Gallery of Victoria, Melbourne– a bronze relief
- Sculpture Column (1969–1972), Reserve Bank of Australia, Brisbane
- Facade Relief (1970–1972), Victorian College of Pharmacy, Parkville, Melbourne
- Sydney Rubbo Memorial Capital (1970–1973), Microbiology and Immunology Building Courtyard, University of Melbourne
- Higuchi Sculpture (1971–1972), Manning Building at the Monash University in Melbourne – unveiled by Dr. Takeru Higuchi details in pdf document page 6
- Extended Column (1972–1975), Canberra School of Music, Canberra
- Paesaggio Cariatide (Carrying the Landscape) (1980–1985), undercroft of State Bank Centre, Bourke Street, in Melbourne – since 2003 at the McClelland Gallery and Sculpture Park in Langwarrin, Victoria
