= McClelland Sculpture Park and Gallery =

McClelland Sculpture Park+Gallery
- Established: 1971
- Location: Langwarrin, Melbourne, Australia
- Coordinates: 38.1463°S 145.1764°E
- Type: Art museum
- Visitors: 130,000
- Director: Lisa Byrne
- Website: http://www.mcclellandgallery.com/

McClelland Sculpture Park and Gallery (stylised as McClelland Sculpture Park+Gallery) is an Australian sculpture park and gallery located in Langwarrin (near Frankston) in Melbourne, Victoria. It displays more than 100 large-scale works by prominent Australian sculptors in 16 hectares of bush and landscaped gardens.

== History ==
Established in 1971 under the will of Miss A. M. (Nan) McClelland, the gallery is situated on land owned by the McClellands and dedicated to Nan's brother, Harry McClelland. As a Victorian regional gallery, the McClelland Foundation Ltd. manages the administration by the McClelland Trust and Elisabeth Murdoch Sculpture Foundation. The McClelland Bequest (est. 1961) continues to support construction, operation and maintenance of the gallery.

The gallery runs a program of changing exhibitions and displays of works from its collection of Australian sculptures, paintings and works on paper. The buildings house a research library and air-conditioned, licensed café, but it is best known for its sculpture park within a system of lakes and billabongs, landscaped gardens and natural bush. In it are found sited a representative selection of works by most of the mid-century avant-garde modernist Centre Five sculptor group, including Inge King, Lenton Parr, Norma Redpath, Clifford Last and Vincas Jomantas, among selections of contemporary Australian sculptors. In 2006, eleven different philanthropists and organisations contributed more than $A2 million toward the addition of another 8 hectares to make a total of 30 hectares as a 'green wedge' and for the display of sculpture and to more than double the size of its gallery buildings.

Architects Munro and Sargent designed the original building with a large and small gallery space, storeroom, offices and kitchen facilities for catering openings. In 1997 it closed for two years for extensive refurbishment by architects Williams and Boag who upgraded café, shop, existing exhibition spaces and offices, brought the collection storage facilities and secure loading dock up to contemporary standards, and provided a multi-purpose room while maintaining the integrity of the original Munro and Sargent design, joining extensions subtly to the original modernist building. Four community arts and crafts studios, Harry McClelland's studio and a small caretakers residence are within the grounds.

=== Directors ===
- 1971-75: Carl Andrew
- 1975-77: John Ashworth
- 1977-78: Denis Colsey
- 1978-79: David Bradshaw
- 1979-81: Frank McBride
- 1981-84: Raymond Francis
- 1985-97: Simon Klose
- 1998-2000: Jane Alexander
- 2001: Georgia Rouette
- 2001-02: David Bradshaw
- 2002-2006: Simon Ambrose, curator Robert Lindsay
- 2006–2015: Robert Lindsay
- since 2018: Lisa Byrne

== Permanent Collection ==
McCulloch notes that in 2006 there were more than 1,500 works in the collection, of Australian painting, sculpture and supporting material.

To the original 1971 McClelland Collection of paintings, furniture and some decorative arts, twenty-five Rupert Bunny figure drawings were added through donation by Sir Daryl Lindsay in 1973. Other holdings include the Maurice Callow Collection of 75 works of predominantly 19th century English watercolours with a 1982 gift of 45 watercolours and engravings; his daughter Antoinette Niven gifted 22 works on paper by George Bell and his library; the 1992 Dr Orde Poynton Gift comprises over 200 items including prints by Rembrandt, Dürer, Whistler and some Australian paintings and decorative arts; Dame Elisabeth Murdoch AC DBE gifted many through the Elisabeth Murdoch Sculpture Foundation (set. 1989), with support by Dr Joseph Brown AO OBE.; while the L. M. Fornari Bequest (1980) supports the acquisition of Australian paintings, drawing and prints.

=== Selected works in the collection ===
- Bruce Armstrong: City (1987)
- George Baldessin: Untitled (1966/67)
- Geoffrey Bartlett: The rise of the flowering plants (1984)
- Ewan Coates (1965, Melbourne): Three pillars of instant gratification (2007)
- Peter Corlett (1944): Tarax Play Sculpture (1969), La Stupenda (2003)
- Vincas Jomantas (1922–2001): Landing object II (1992)
- John Kelly (1965, Bristol (U.K.): Maquette for a public monument (2003), Untitled (2006)
- Inge King (1918, Berlin): Flight Arrested (1964), Jabaroo (1984), Island Sculpture (1991)
- Clifford Last (1918 - 1991): Metamorphosis II (1987)
- Michael Le Grand: Schism (2006)
- Clement Meadmore (1929, Melbourne): Paraphernalia (1999)
- Robert Owen: Double Vision Nr. 2 (2003)
- Adrian Page : Torus - Hidden and revealed (2003)
- Lenton Parr (1924 - 2003, Melbourne): Custom House Screen
- Phil Price (1965, Nelson, New-Zealand): Ratytus (2005)
- Anthony Pryor (1951 - 1991, Melbourne): Sea Legend (1991–2000)
- Norma Redpath (1928, Melbourne): Untitled (1964), Desert Arch (1968), Landscape Caryatid (1980/85)
- Ron Robertson-Swann (1941, Sydney): Turn (1988), Lunar chariot (2003)
- Lisa Roet (1967, Melbourne): White Ape (2005)
- Peter Schipperheyn (1955, Melbourne): Thus Spake Zarathustra (2006)
- Ken Unsworth (1931, Melbourne): Annulus of stones (2007)
- David Wilson (1947, London): Black Vessel (1977), Earth (1978), Dry pool (1979), Shore column (1981), Stump stall (1985) en Around the mirror (1987)

== Selected exhibitions ==
- 1982: Australian printmakers 1945-81
- 2002: 9 March–19 May 2002: Rodin, A Magnificent Obsession: Sculpture and Drawings
- 2004, 8 August 2004: King hits. Inge King: Small Sculptures. Grahame King: Master printer and painter
- 2004, 10 October–5 December: Lisa Roet: finger of suspicion
- 2005: The McClelland Contemporary Sculpture Survey & McClelland Award 2005
- 2007–3 February 2008: The farside of the moon
- 2007–3 February 2008: The Mary and Lou Senini Student Art Award - Ceramics
- 2007, 8 April –1 July: Anthony Pryor: Maquettes and monuments
- 2007,15 July–28 October: McClelland: the bohemian legacy
- 2007/08, 18 November–6 July:The McClelland Sculpture Survey & Award 2007
- 2008, from 4 May: Premonitions: Monash University Collection 1961-2007
- 2008 from 6 July: McClelland sculpture survey
- 2009/10, 16 November–1 February: Misty Moderns: Australian tonalists 1915-1950
- 2009, 10 May–19 July: The gallery ark
- 2009, 15 February–27 April: Sydney Ball: The colour paintings 1963-2007
- 2009, 15 February–27 April: Jacob Epstein: Portraits and flowers
- 2009, 10 May–19 July:Teisutis Zikaras: Sculptures and drawings
- 2009, 2 August–11 October: Journey: the sculpture of Augustine Dall'Ava
- 2010/11: MacClelland sculpture survey & award 2010
- 2011, 6 March–15 May: Simryn Gill: Inland
- 2011, 6 March–15 May: David Wadelton: Icons of suburbia
- 2011, 21 August–30 October: John Farmer: landscapes and vignettes
- 2012/13, 18 November–14 July: McClelland Sculpture survey & award 2012
- 2014: McClelland sculpture survey & award 2014
- 2014/15, 16 November–8 February: Map 12 Christopher Langton: this is not a life saving device
- 2022/23, 12 November–5 March: Centre 5: bridging the gap.

== Publications ==
- Dall'Ava, Augustine (2009). Journey : the sculpture of Augustine Dall'Ava (exhibition cat. ed.). Langwarrin, Vic.: McClelland Gallery + Sculpture Park. ISBN 9780980429015.

== Photo gallery ==
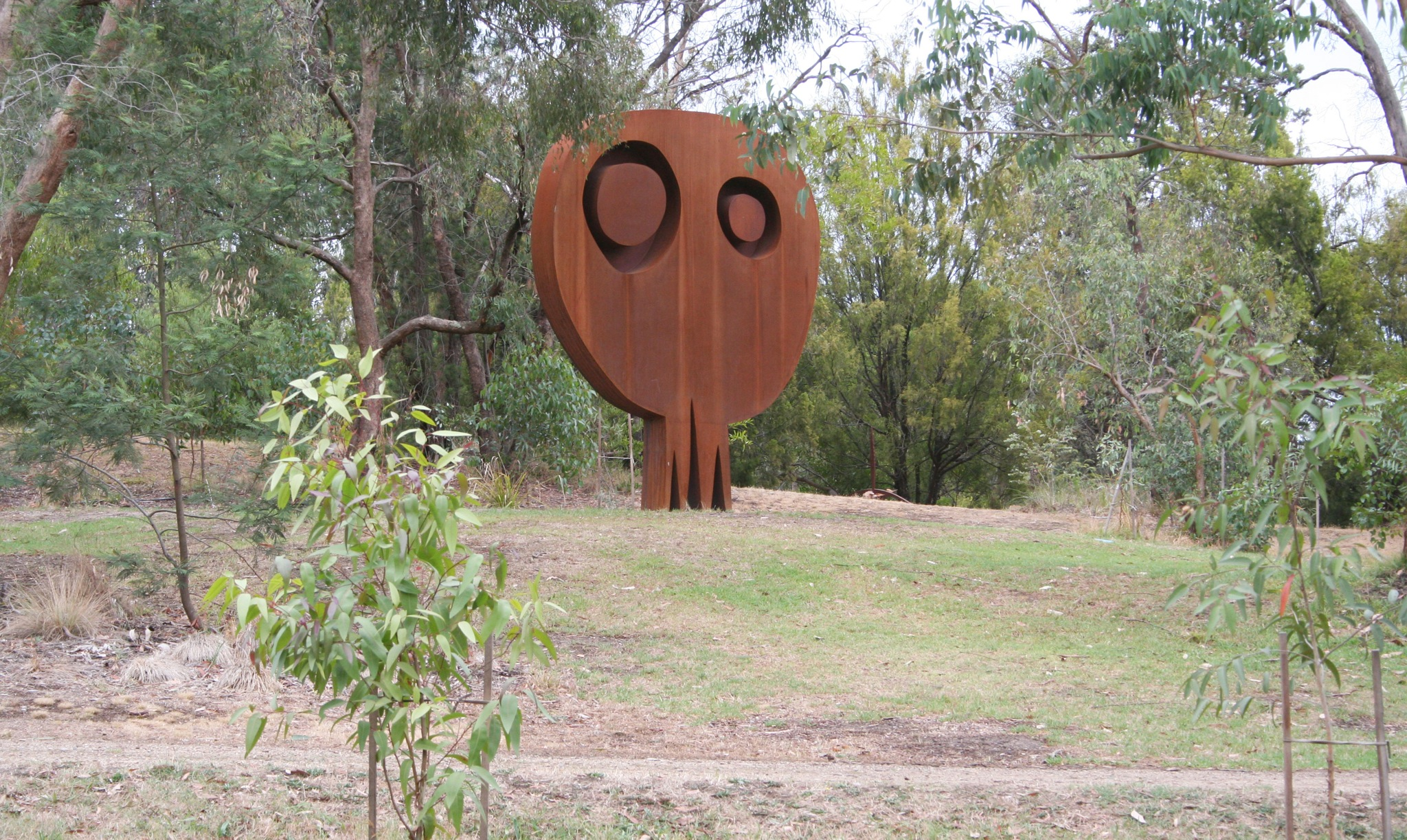
Untitled (2006) by John Kelly

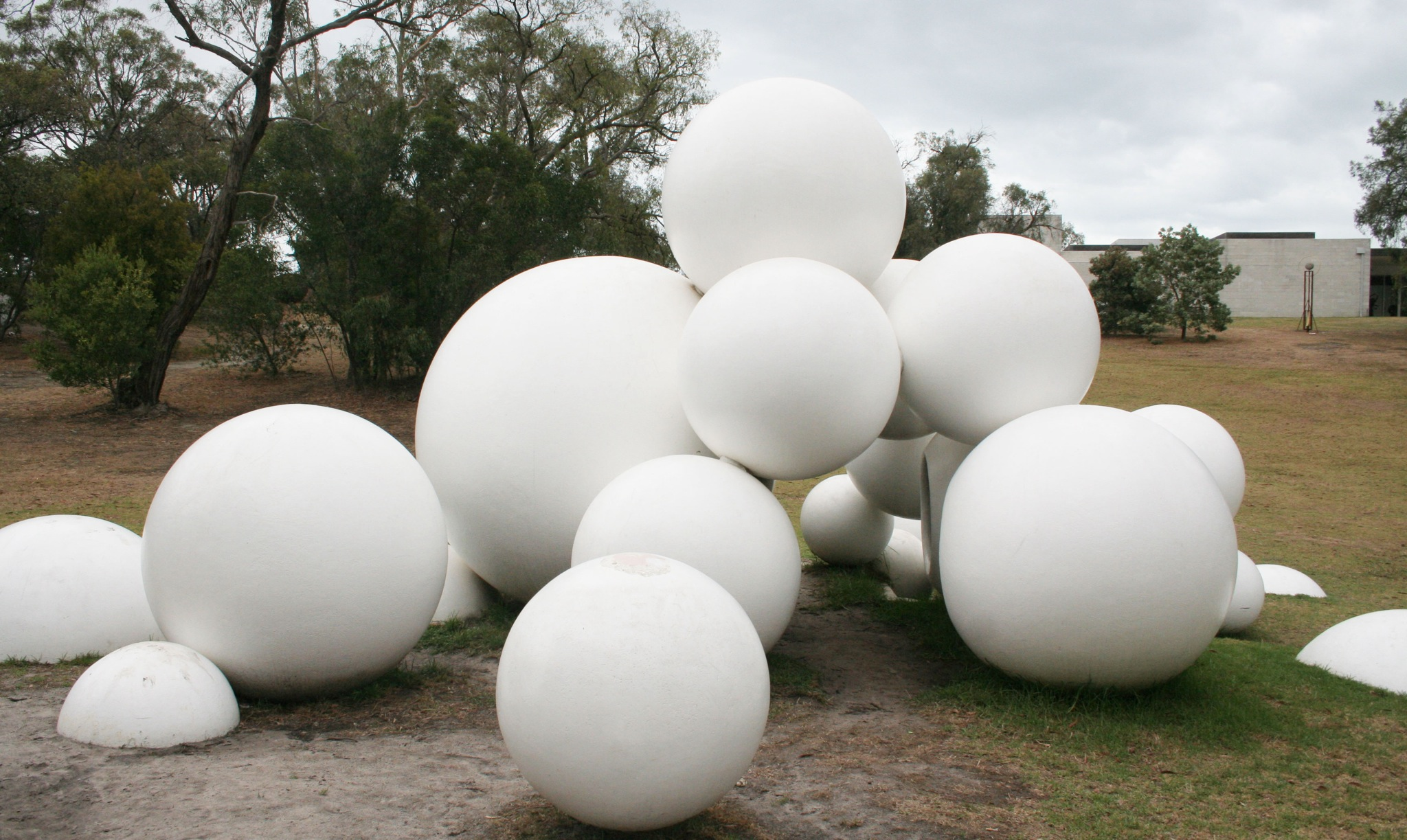
Tarax Play Sculpture (1969) by Peter Corlett

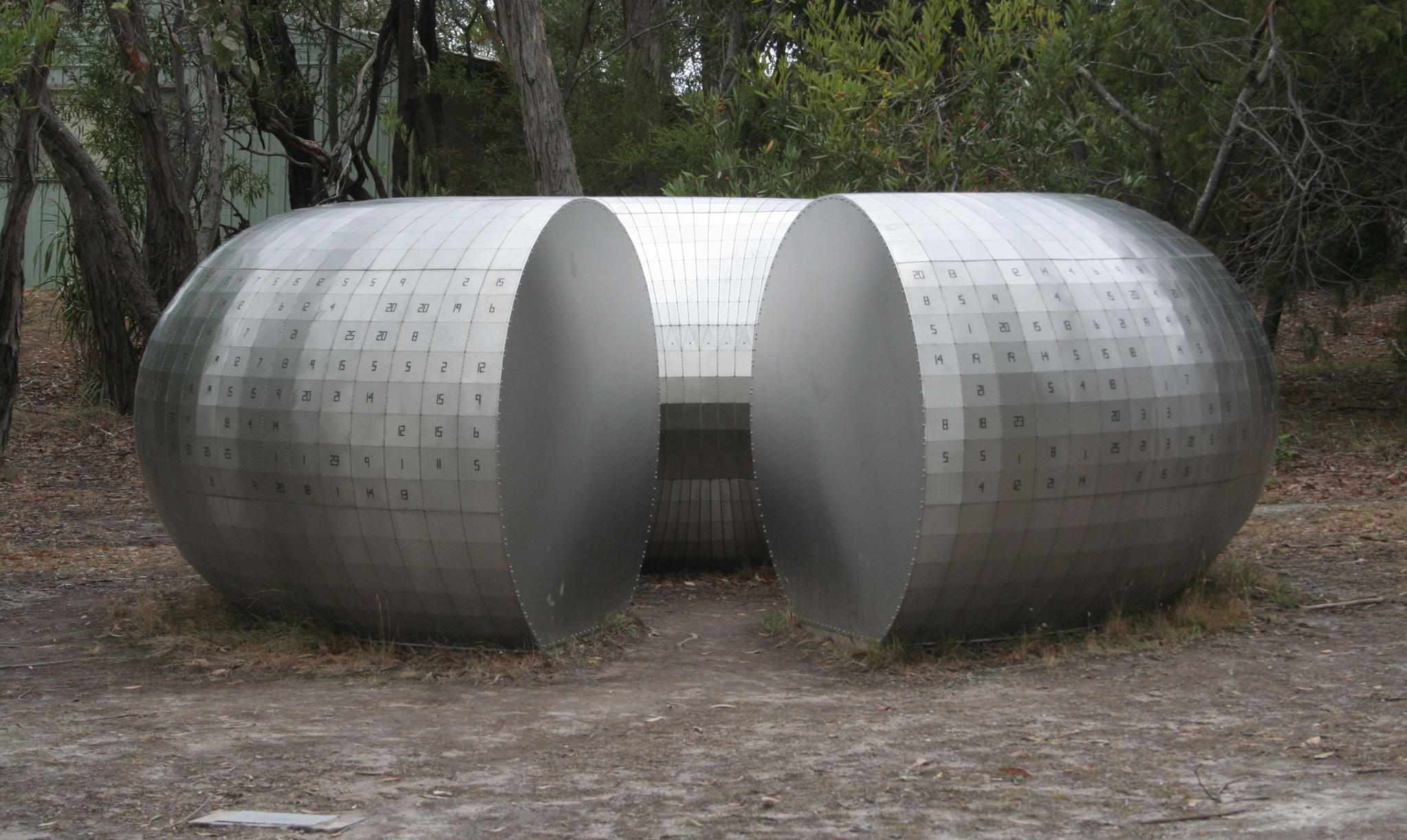
Torus - Hidden and revealed (2003) by Adrian Page
