= Ken Scarlett =

Australian writer on sculpture

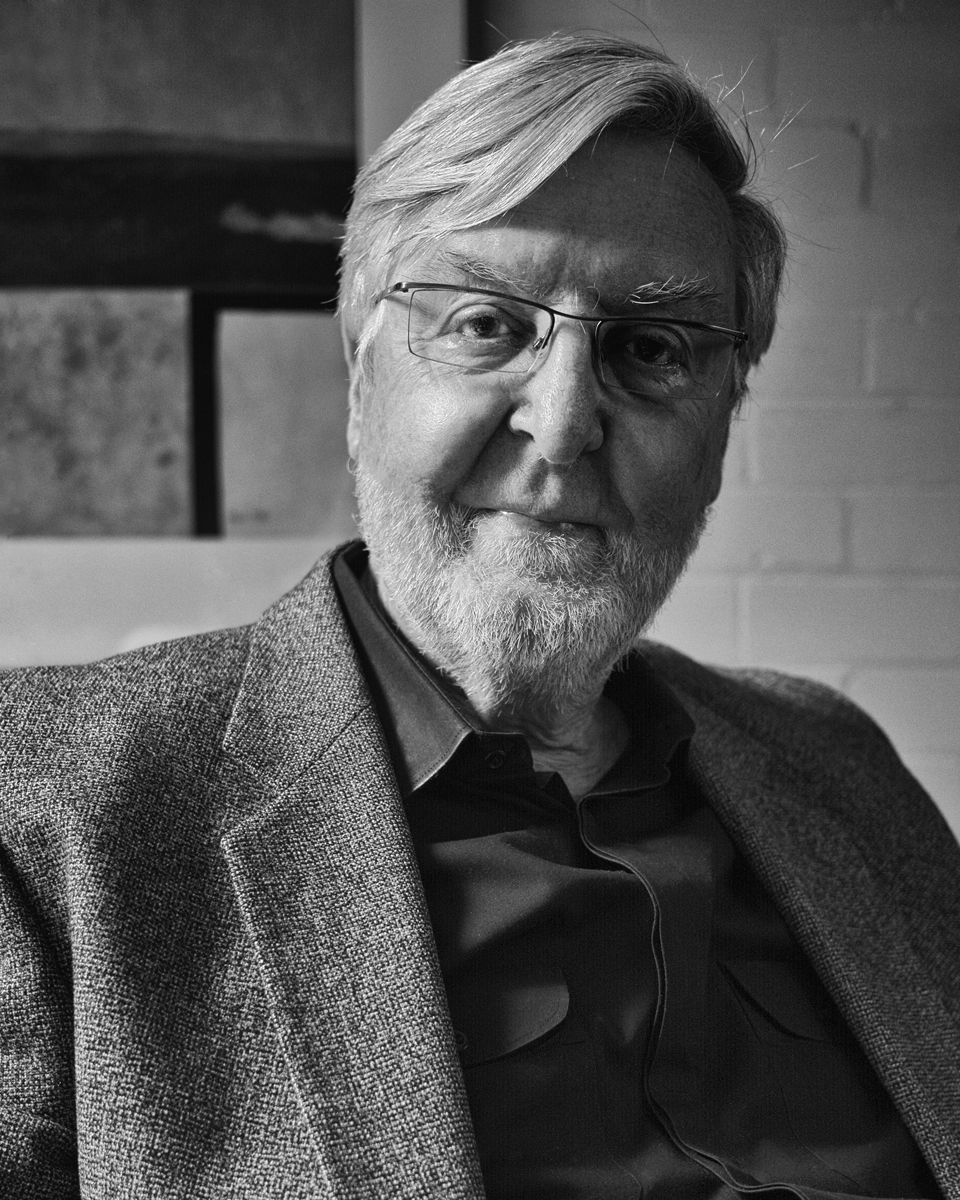
- Born: 27 November 1927 (age 98); Brighton, Melbourne, Australia
- Occupations: Writer, Art Curator
- Writing career
- Subject: Sculpture
- Notable awards: OAM

Kenneth William Scarlett OAM (born 27 November 1927) is an Australian historian, writer and critic specialising in Australian sculpture. His 1980 publication Australian Sculptors was the first to present a complete survey of sculpture in Australia.

== Early life and training ==
Ken Scarlett was born in Brighton in 1927, the only child of Janet Matilda Ann (née Bunny, and related to Rupert) and William George Scarlett. He studied at Melbourne High School and, inspired by exhibitions he attended and wrote up for the school magazine, he then undertook an Education Department bonded studentship to train as an art/craft teacher at Caulfield Technical College where one of his instructors, Stan Brown, encouraged his making of small sculptures solid-cast in lead type-metal.

The last year of his teacher training was at Melbourne Teachers College in 1949, where Scarlett associated with left-wing students and joined the Communist Party in 1950, the year in which he first taught, at St Arnaud. There he distributed pamphlets protesting Australia's involvement in the Korean War, and made paintings of the local landscape; by then married, the couple spent 1954 overseas, then took up positions at Warragul High School in Gippsland, where he was an instigator of the Warragul and District Education Committee. After teaching at Kyabram, he resigned from the Education Department in 1957.

While supporting himself as an Education Officer at the National Gallery of Victoria at the invitation of Deputy Director Gordon Thomson, from 1958 to 1960 he studied sculpture at RMIT under the conservative modernist George Allen, and Lenton Parr who had recently been Henry Moore’s assistant in England, and who introduced the medium of oxyacetylene welding, and its potential for sculptural assemblage. After completing his course at RMIT, Scarlett taught at Melbourne High School from 1961 to 1964.

== Sculptor ==
In 1961 Scarlett first exhibited his sculpture, at the Mildura Prize for Sculpture (forerunner of the MIldura Sculpture Triennial). He joined the Victorian Sculptors’ Society in that year, and was its president twice, first over 1964–65, and later when in became the Association of Sculptors of Victoria. Through Communist Party meetings he met sculptor Ailsa O’Connor, and invited social realist painter Noel Counihan to speak at the NGV and elsewhere and who recruited Scarlett to exhibit annually with the Realist Group 1963–1967 and at the group's show at Newcastle City Art Gallery in 1968. Scarlett's left-wing politics and anti-war agitation during the Cold War period inform his imagery.

Appointed lecturer in art and sculpture at the Melbourne State College, Scarlett became director of its Gryphon Gallery, 1976–87. Living in Hampton, he was one amongst a number of sculptors in that bayside suburb, the group nicknamed by Patrick McCaughey the 'Hampton Mafia'; John Davis, David Wilson, Clive Murray-White, and Ti Parks, with Lenton Parr and Roger Kemp in Sandringham and Marc Clark at Beaumaris. Painters Sandra Leveson, Craig Gough, Steve Spurrier, Fred Cress and Alun Leach-Jones lived nearby, and like Scarlett, most were teachers. In 1970 he exhibited in, and was executive manager of, the Fourth MIldura Sculpture Triennial, which featured a number of those sculptors.

Though Scarlett continued to practise sculpture, evolving ever more abstract figurative works, after his last exhibition in Artists for Labor and Democracy in 1975 at Toorak Art Gallery, South Yarra, Scarlett turned to research and writing about Australian sculpture.

== Curator ==
Subsequently, Scarlett curated a number of exhibitions of sculpture not only in major galleries, including at McClelland Gallery and Sculpture Park and Heide Museum of Modern Art, but also in unorthodox venues as diverse as hospitals, shopping complexes, parks and gardens.

The Sculpture Walk in Melbourne's Royal Botanic Gardens (1996) was a major exhibition Scarlett curated,

Since 1973, when he presented to the Bezalel Art Society, Scarlett is regularly invited to lecture to the public on various aspects of Australian sculpture at venues including the National Gallery of Victoria, the Art Gallery of New South Wales and Sotheby's and Christie's auction houses.

== Publications and reception ==
Paramount amongst Scarlett's publications is his 1980 Australian Sculptors, funded by a 1977 government grant of $5,000, which with illustrated entries on 450 sculptors constitutes "an encyclopaedia — beyond that, a marvellously useful research tool" in Graeme Sturgeon's estimation in his review of it in Art and Australia, qualified by his recognition that because "the history of European settlement in Australia is so very brief, the effort to establish a sense of our own identity needs all the help it can get. A book such as this justifies its creation because it assists with the process of national self-knowledge." A companion to the 730 page volume, and published the previous year, is his Australian sculptors exhibition lists.

Scarlett's other books include Sculpture in Public Gardens (1983), Elgee Park: Sculpture in the Landscape (2010) and monographs on the sculptors John Davis (1989) and Andrew Rogers (2010), and Limited Recall: A Fictional Autobiography (2005). His survey of the Mildura Sculpture Triennials, Mildura Revisited: Sculptures Exhibited 1961-1978 (Mildura Arts Centre 2015), was reviewed by Clive Murray-White who salutes Scarlett's role in promoting the triennials and his 'selfless' undertaking of "the massive project to map our nation's sculptural gene pool in the book Australian Sculptors".

In his review of The Sculpture of John Davis (1989) "the first truly Australian-based sculptor to acquire any sort of international reputation," David Doolan, then curator of Nolan gallery at Lanyon, notes that "Scarlett's study is as subtle, complex, surprising and self-effacing as the best of Davis's art." Scarlett's major achievement in his "scholarly, intelligently written" Contemporary Sculpture in Australian Gardens (1993), Sasha Grishin writes, is to show that there is...quality sculpture...in Australia [that] takes into account the natural setting of the Australian landscape. [It] is a pioneering book [encouraging] local audience for Australian sculpture."

Scarlett was a contributing editor to Sculpture (magazine) USA for many years, and his articles appear regularly in art journals in Australia and overseas. He writes obituaries of prominent sculptors for newspapers including The Sydney Morning Herald, and The Age.

An archive of the papers of Ken Scarlett, collected by him over twenty years 1968–1988, is held in the State Library of Victoria.

== Awards and honours ==
In 1996 Scarlett was awarded the Medal of the Order of Australia for services to sculpture.

The Lorne Sculpture Biennale named The Scarlett Award for art criticism after him.

== Books ==
- Scarlett, Ken (1980). Australian sculptors. West Melbourne, Vic.: Thomas Nelson (Australia). ISBN 9780170052924.
- The Sculpture of John Davis: Places and Locations. (1989) Hyland House Publishing. ISBN 978-0-947062-26-2
- Contemporary Sculpture in Australian Gardens, (1993) Craftsman House/ Gordon and BreachArts International. ISBN 978-976-8097-46-0
- Rhythms of Life: Andrew Rogers. (2003) Palgrave Macmillan. ISBN 978-1-876832-61-2
- Elgee Park: Sculpture in the Landscape. (2004) revised edition (2010) Macmillan Art Publishing, Melbourne. ISBN 978-1-921394-45-4
- Limited Recall. (2005) Macmillan Art Publishing, Melbourne. ISBN 1-876832-51-7
- Vincas Jomantas. Ken Scarlett and Robert Lindsay, (2018) The Beagle Press ISBN 978-0-947349-61-5
- Augustine Dall'Ava: The Sculptor. Ken Scarlett (2022) Australian Scholarly Publishing, Melbourne. ISBN 978-1-922669-87-2

== Curation ==
Scarlett has acted as Curator of the following exhibitions -

- 1979 Rex Keogh and Reg Parker recent works. Gryphon Gallery
- 1983, Three years: Elwyn Dennis: architecture, painting, sculpture, drawing & sound. Gryphon Gallery
- 1986, Sculpture for Melbourne: individual exhibition series by Hossein Valamanesh, Geoffrey Bartlett, Chris Beecroft and Alexis Preston, Gary Cumming and Dan Wollmering, David Jenz & Wendy Teakel. Gryphon Gallery
- 1987 New sculpture: Anderson Hunt, Craig Peverelle. Gryphon Gallery
- 1988 John Davis: Places and Locations., at Heide Park and Art Gallery.
- 1990 Contemporary Australian Sculpture, for ACAF Australian Contemporary Art Fair Two at Royal Exhibition Building, Melbourne.
- 1992 Contemporary Australian Sculpture Exhibition, ACAF Third Australian Contemporary Art Fair, Royal Exhibition Building.
- 1992-94 Dame Edna Regrets She is Unable to Attend - Humour and Satire in Contemporary Sculpture which toured 11 galleries in Queensland, NSW, Victoria, ACT and Tasmania.
- 1993- Kyneton Collection, for Shire of Kyneton.
- 1994 Sculpture for Heidelberg, at Heidelberg Repatriation Hospital.
- 1995 Continuum and Contrast, Mc Clelland Gallery.
- 1995 Sculpture at Heidelberg, Austin and Repatriation Medical Centre.
- 1995 The Kyneton Collection, Shire of Macedon Ranges.
- 1996 Royal Botanic Gardens, Melbourne: Sculpture Walk.
- 1996 Sculpture Trail, Victoria University of Technology and Footscray Park, City of Maribyrnong.
- 1996 Sculpture Three, Austin and Repatriation Medical Centre.
- 1997 House and Garden. Sculpture at Heidelberg, Austin and Repatriation Medical Centre.
- 1998 Sculpture in the Dandenong Ranges Gardens, Concurrence or Contrast’ Parks Victoria.
- 2001 Sculpture at Seawinds. Old Landscape: New Garden, Parks Victoria.
- 2002 Toorak Village Festival of Sculpture, Toorak.
- 2003 Vincas Jomantas Retrospective, Mc Clelland Gallery.
- 2006 Erwin Fabian: a Survey, at McCleland Gallery + Sculpture Park and Erwin Fabian: Recent Works, at Australian Galleries.
- 2008 Venerate the Earth sculpture of Peter Blizzard, Australian Galleries, Melbourne.
- 2009 Teisutis Zikaras: Sculptures and Drawings, McClelland Gallery+Sculpture Park.
- 2012 Sculpture and Drawings of Clive Stephen.
