= Zikaras =

Zikaras is a Lithuanian surname, its female form is Zikaraitė. Notable people with the surname include:

- Juozas Zikaras (1881–1944), Lithuanian sculptor and artist
- Teisutis Zikaras (1922–1991), Lithuanian-born Australian sculptor
