= Vincas Jomantas =

Lithuanian-born Australian sculptor 1922–2001

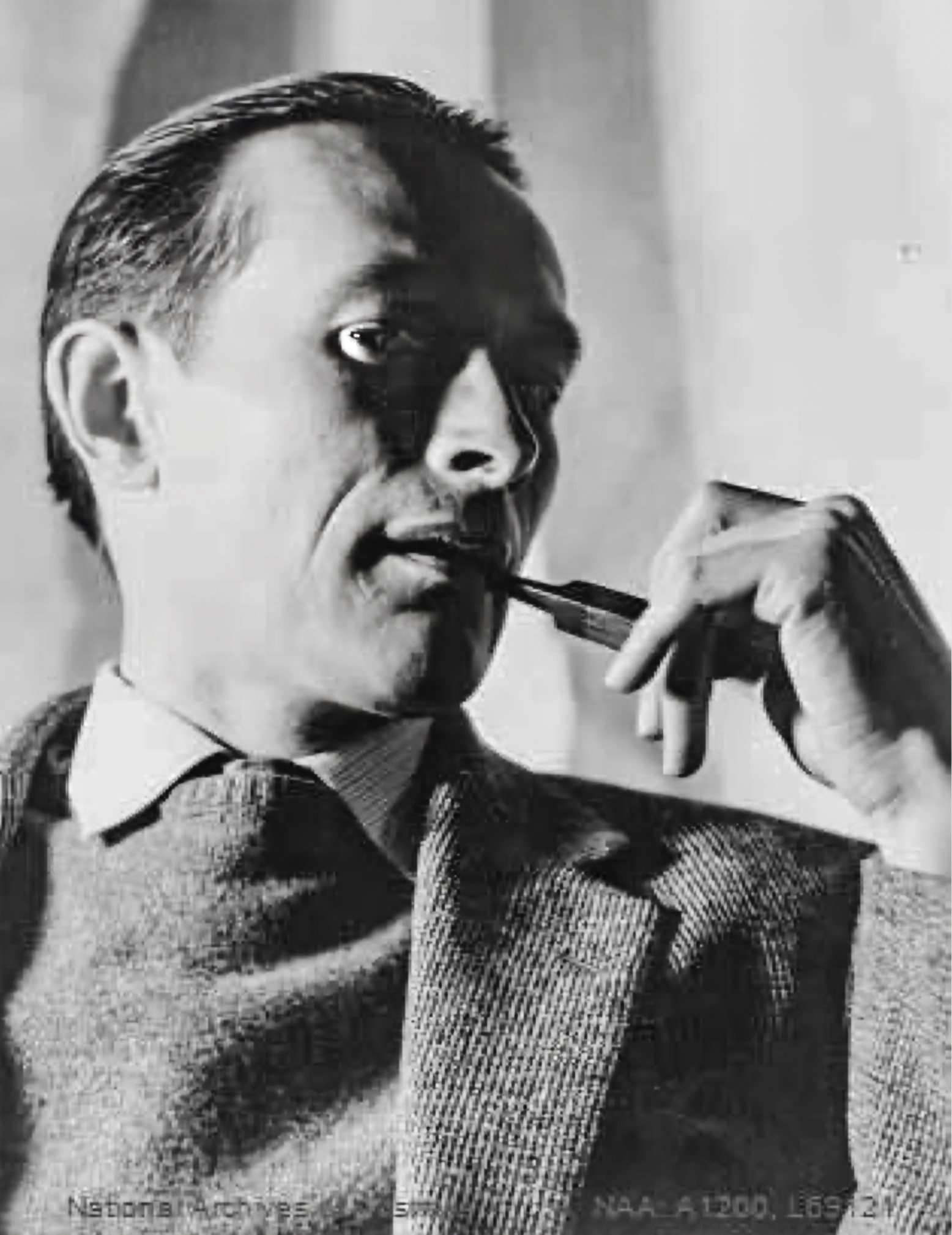
- Vincas Jomantas in 1968
- Born: 1922; Kaunas, Lithuania
- Died: December 19, 2001 (aged 78–79); Melbourne, Victoria
- Education: School of Fine Art, Vilnius
- Known for: modernist sculpture in bronze, aluminium, wood, polyester
- Notable work: 1969 Sculptural Screen in aluminium for Australian Chancery in Washington
- Style: biomorphic abstraction
- Movement: Modernism
- Spouse: Laima (née Taskunas)
- Father: Vilus Jomantas
- Awards: Winner, 1968 Comalco Invitation Award for Sculpture

Vincas (a.k.a. Vincent) Jomantas (1922–2001) was a Lithuania-born Australian sculptor who advanced modern sculpture as a significant professional practice in postwar Australia. Trained in Lithuania and postwar Germany, he arrived in Australia in 1948 as a displaced person.

Committed to fine craftsmanship and developing novel forms in materials including wood, bronze, steel, aluminium and polyester resins, his style evolved from formally controlled, often symmetrical structures towards more biomorphic and spatially complex forms.

A founding member of Centre Five, Jomantas played an important role in the group’s campaign to integrate sculpture with architecture and secure professional opportunities for sculptors.

His increasing architectural commissions included major works for the Australian National University, Monash University, Kingsford Smith Airport and the Australian Chancery in Washington. Alongside his studio practice, he taught sculpture at RMIT from 1960, becoming Senior Lecturer in 1973.

== Early life and training ==
Jomantas was born 1922 at Kaunas, Lithuania where he undertook his early art training as a graphic artist with his father Vilus Jomantas, a member of the Lithuanian Artists’ Union. He then enrolled at the School of Fine Art in Vilnius 1942-44.

Scarlett, and likewise Borthwick, contends that Jomantas’ "Lithuanian heritage, in an indirect manner, underlies all of his work. … [All] pervading, are the moods, the feelings, the attitudes that emanate from this small northern European country… The long winters and dark nights tend to induce a sense of introspection, even a mood of pessimism that is foreign to Europeans from the shores of the Mediterranean." In an interview with James Gleeson Jomantas himself acknowledged the influence of Lithuanian woodcarving on at least one of his works, Poet, of 1961, particularly the extensive use of wood in Lithuanian buildings, crosses and chapels, saying he has no intention of avoiding these early cultural influences.

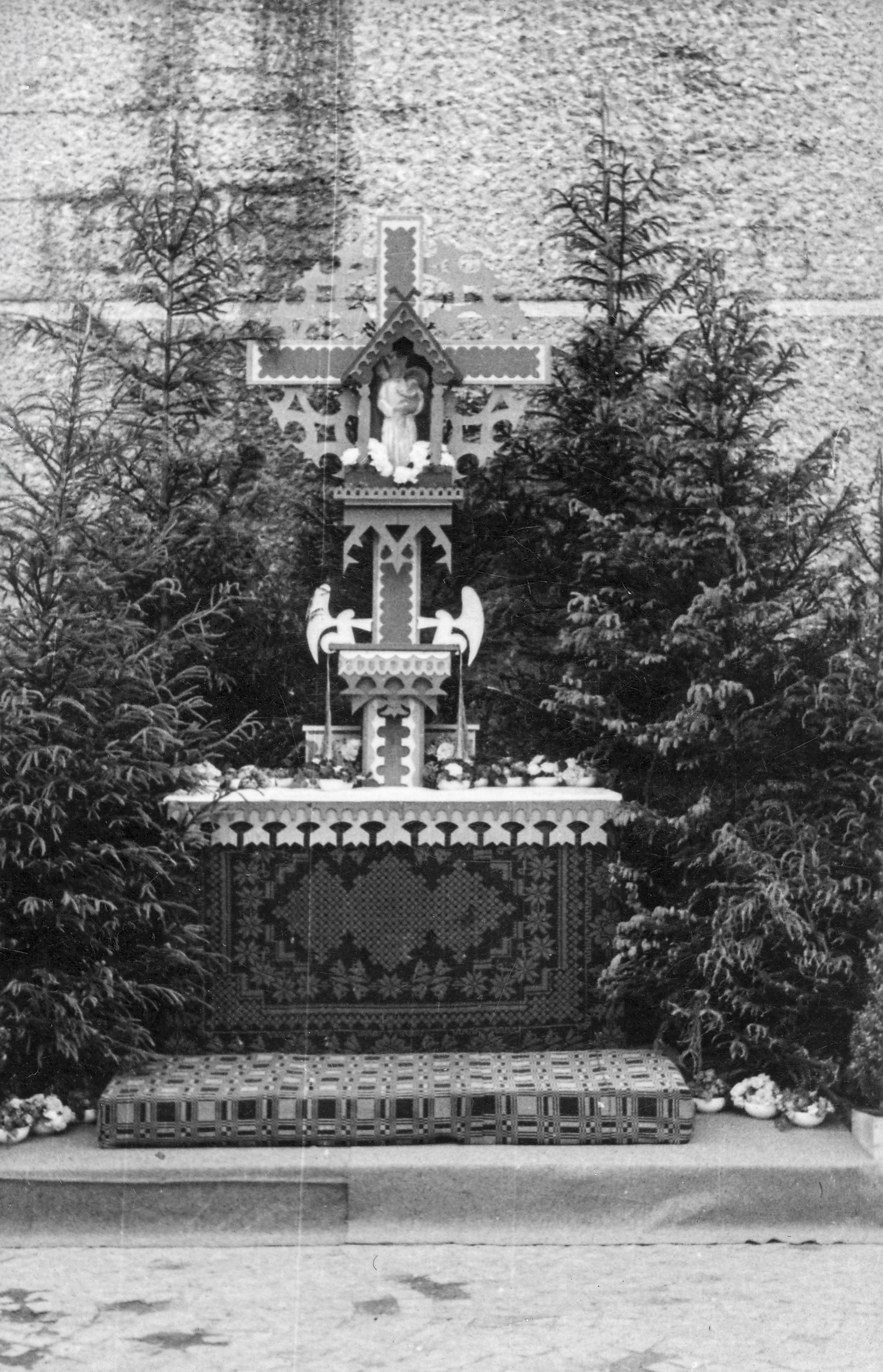
Vincas Jomantas (1946) photograph by the sculptor of an altar made by him, Freimann Barracks, Munich

After WW2 he studied at the Academy of Fine Art and School of Applied Art in Munich, West Germany, 1946-48. Among other works, he competed altar with a large cross in 1946 for the Freimann Kaserne, in Munich, its whereabouts now unknown. In Lubytė’s view, therefore, Jomantas should be considered primarily the product of a German education and the post-war diaspora.

== Australia ==
Stateless after the war, during which, in June 1940, the Soviet Union had occupied and annexed Lithuania, Jomantas left Genoa as a 'displaced person' on SS Kanimbla on 17 September 1948, arriving on 11 October at Graylands migrant hostel in Fremantle. He took a variety of semi-skilled jobs, first working for eighteen months from early November 1948 the Adelaide Timber Company mill in East Witchcliffe where his making sculptures was encouraged by the owner, then over 1951-52 was a house painter in country areas of Victoria. From 1952-54, he worked in a toy factory, then in the furniture trade. In 1955 he joined the Contemporary Art Society of Australia (Victoria) while employed as a draughtsman with the State Rivers and Water Supply Commission (1955-60).

== Sculptor ==
Alongside his employment, Jomantas practiced as a sculptor, exhibiting at Peter Bray Gallery in 1957, and joining Norma Redpath, Inga King, Teisutis Zikaras, Julius Kane, and Clifford Last in the exhibition Six Sculptors at the National Gallery of Victoria in 1959, one of the main sculpture events of the late 1950s and a rare acknowledgement of sculpture amongst many more surveys of painting.

In 1960 Jomantas took the post of Lecturer in Sculpture, alongside Kevin Mortensen, in the Fine Arts Department, at the Royal Melbourne Institute of Technology, where he taught, among others, Phillip Cannizzo and Anthony Pryor, and was promoted to Senior Lecturer in 1973.

In 1964 the Centre Five exhibited in Sydney at Kym Bonython's Hungry Horse Gallery, to which Sydney art critic, James Gleeson, responded unenthusiastically, though finding two of the pieces..."works of real distinction: Meditators, by Vincas Lomantas, and The Dark Tower, by Inge King."

For two years Jomantas shared a studio with painter Leonard French, then in 1965 he married Laima Taskunas and the couple bought a house in Cheltenham.

Bill Hannan, writing in late 1965 in The Bulletin on the neglect of sculpture in Australia proposes reasons for sculpture’s "late growth...obvious to visitors to the touring exhibition of Recent Australian Sculpture at the State Galleries. The absence of any continuing local tradition is striking. The number of European-born sculptors is equally striking. Most of our important sculptors, in short, have had all or a major part of their formation in Europe. They reflect therefore a continually dating internationalism, which, lacking strong local stimulus, tends to become too withdrawn." He goes on to group the work of Jomantas, with that of Clement Meadmore, (by then in America), Julius Kane (who had died in 1962) and Inge King, as being concerned with "the enclosure of space and the penetration of space into mass."

== Centre Five ==
Though its then president the Hungarian sculptor Andor Mészáros encouraged the adoption of sculpture in public places, that year Jomantas split from the Victorian Sculptors Society that he had joined in 1958, and with Julius Kane, Clifford Last, Lenton Parr, Teisutis Zikaras, Inge King formed the group Centre Five, which from 1963 set out on an 'educational programme' to make potential patrons aware of the existence of sculptors working as professional artists in Melbourne. They made presentations in art schools, particularly to students of architecture proposing that they consider sculpture as a part of architecture'' and also directly to such major Melbourne architecture firms as Bates, Smart and McCutcheon. They invited visits by students in the School of Architecture, University of Melbourne, and at the Royal Melbourne Institute of Technology to Centre Five studios to see technical demonstrations to enlarge students' knowledge of sculpture and create a deeper appreciation of an art so closely associated with architecture. Jomantas showed carving and assemblage in wood and metal, as well as plaster of paris and bronze work.

Centre Five members Jomantas, with Norma Redpath, Inge King and Lenton Parr entered the 2nd Mildura Sculpture Triennial in 1964, in which Redpath carried off the first prize, while Jomantas who, as reviewer Hannon commented, less frequently exhibited but produced works of "exacting finish and rigid standards", was awarded the £500 acquisitive prize (value A$17,712.00 in 2025).

As Lindsay notes, Centre Five did a great deal to promote professional attitudes and stimulate and educate interest in sculpture amongst architects and some of the state art galleries. Eckett remarks that Scarlett and art curator and exhibition officer at the National Gallery of Victoria John Stringer both considered the professionalism of Centre Five to "transcend egocentrism", reporting that Australian National Gallery director James Mollison found that ‘none of them tried to promote themselves as the great personality’. It was from their lobbying that Jomantas benefitted with an increasing number of commissions.

Members of the group, Norma Redpath, Inge King and Lenton Parr, were among six invited sculptors, each receiving a fee of $750 (value A$11,680.00 in 2025) to make a maquette of a free-standing, aluminium dividing screen for the 1968 'Comalco Invitation Award for Sculpture in Aluminium', with a prize of $3,000 (valued about A$50,000 in 2025). Five finally submitted work which was judged at the National Gallery of Victoria and exhibited at Bonython Gallery in November. Judges Eric Westbrook, Tony Tuckson, and architect R. M. Simpson, went to Jomantas' screen which Lynn described in The Bulletin as "rods of varying thickness and brilliance ...about four deep, the rods looked so like a series of vigorous, vertical pumps that the lateral movement, which forms the screen, passes unnoticed. The curved surfaces and shifting apertures entice the eye and mind to move beyond the screen." In 1969 Jomantas' work eventually found a home in the Australian Embassy in Washington, where it divided the foyer and main reception hall.

In 1970 Jomantas expanded his contacts by joining the Society of Sculptors and Associates in Sydney, and his 1976 Girl with birds was acquired by the National Gallery of Australia and displayed in the Sculpture Garden.

== Reception ==
The younger Australian sculptor Clement Meadmore for his article in Hemisphere: An Asian–Australian Magazine in early 1963, limited his discussion to five sculptors who are "much more developed than all the others," including Vincas Jomantas, whose The Judge, The Gardner, are illustrated. He describes how Jomantas' "classical and almost completely symmetrical" forms, have an "unnerving effect," a "mysterious vitality which gives all good sculpture its impact, mysterious because no matter how universally perceptible the meaning of the sculpture, the vitality is that of a unique individual, one who has no twin in the world or the universe and yet feels his relationship to the whole."

Of Jomantas' 1963 Guardant, purchased for the Mildura Arts Centre, Catalano writes in 1981 of a two-dimensional quality and abstract symbolism influenced by his Lithuanian origins and his encounter with the paintings of Leonard French still evident in Jomantas' "approach and set of forms in his bronzes of the early 1960s, and in a piece like Guardant...produce as striking an image as any created by the painters of that period. Although his origins are clearly apparent in the piece (the angular articulations of its "column' recall Lipchitz's early cubist pieces, while its general scheme is related to the same artist's Ploumanach of 1926), Guardant also managed to assert itself as a true presence in the Australian landscape. It is no less at home in its surroundings than any Kelly of Sidney Nolan's."

In 1964 Hannon discerned a move away from abstraction in painting, especially amongst younger artists, though remarked Jomantas and the other sculptors from Centre Five, being older and of formative European experience, "adhering to more formal styles."

Lynn, by 1967, noted a change in Jomantas' direction from monolithic forms and symmetry to "Ernst-like" individuated, biomorphic forms:

especially in such fine works as Awakening of Giants I, where four laminated wooden legs, banded with beautifully integrated pink polyester, swirl like a cobra foursome from a base like an inverted castle tower, and in Giants II, which consists of three separate off-white, pale blue, and pale pink undulating phallic shapes. It sounds a little sickly, but the slow rhythms and the genteel color are foils to the subdued but persistent energy. In Meeting of Nobles, with three separated objects on a hemisphere, each formally undistinguished, but cohering with a slightly weird effect, he comes closest to Ernst and even his off-white plastic Sacrifice, with its overlapping, interpenetrating horizontal layers suggests a model for a future city designed by a surreal architect.

In his solo exhibition at Rudy Komon Gallery in 1974 Jomontas' work in bronze, wood and white polyester is described by an anonymous reviewer in The Bulletin as "finely constructed...[and] based on a European tradition of craftsmanship and respect for materials ... their symbolic content is conveyed in an architectural organisation of solid shapes prisms, pyramids, cylinders, truncated forms, cut and spliced ovals, and tooth-edged projections. They are handsome, heraldic works that stand aloof on their pedestals from current sculptural trends."

In 1961 Jomantas supplied for Lenton Parr's The Arts in Australia: Sculpture a photograph of his Tower of Grief carved from a single block of wood, embedded in sand next to a sea wall, rising up, as Roger Butler notes in 2002, "like some strange new plant against the backdrop of a moody sky - a metaphor perhaps for his own exile from Europe and the ever-present grief caused by this separation."

Jomantas died in Melbourne on 19 December, 2001.

== Selected exhibitions ==
=== Solo ===
- 1974: Vincas Jomantas. Rudy Komon Art Gallery
- 1976: Vincas Jomantas: Sculpture in wood and graphic works. Rudy Komon Art Gallery
- 1982, 18th May-4th June: Vincas Jomantas: sculpture, 1962-1982. RMIT Gallery

=== Group ===
- 1957: Exhibition of Sculpture. Anita Aarons, Ola Cohn, Clifford Last, Lenton Parr, Clement Meadmore, Andor Mészáros, Tina Wentcher, Teisutis Zikaras, Vincas Jomantas. Peter Bray Gallery, Melbourne
- 1968, 19–24 January: Recent Australian Sculpture, presented by the Commonwealth Art Advisory Board in association with the Department of the Interior. Jomantas with Robert Klippel, George Baldessin and others. Albert Hall, Canberra, ACT
- 1968, from 17 May: Exhibition at the opening of the Forestry Building by HRH the Duke of Edinburgh. The Australian National University
- 1995, 10 March–30 April: Parliament House Art Collection with Clement Meadmore, Robert Klippel, Burt Flugelmah, Inge King, Jock Clutterbuck, Les Kossatz and others in conjunction with the first Canberra National Sculpture Forum. Parliament House Canberra ACT

=== Posthumous ===
- 2003, 6 July–1 September: McClelland Gallery + Sculpture Park
- 2023, 12 November–5 March: Centre Five: Bridging the Gap, McClelland Gallery + Sculpture Park

== Awards, prizes ==
- 1964 Acquisitve Prize, Mildura Sculpture Exhibition
- 1968 Comalco Invitation Award for Sculpture

== Commissions ==
- 1958 Physics Building, Australian National University, Canberra
- 1963 Sculptural Wall, office foyer, Broken Hill North Ltd, Broken Hill, NSW
- 1963 Christening font for St George's Church, East Ivanhoe, Melbourne
- 1967 Designed walls in concrete for Auditorium of Alexander Theatre at Monash University, Melbourne
- 1968 Wall sculpture in wood for new Forestry School, Australian National University, Canberra.
- 1969 Sculptural Screen in aluminium for Australian Chancery in Washington
- 1970 Sculpture in stainless steel for Kingsford Smith Airport, Sydney.
- 1971 Coat of Arms for State Government Offices, Treasury Place, Melbourne.
- 1972 Aluminium wall sculpture for Eagle House, Melbourne.
- 1974 Administrative Building, Asian Institute of Technology, Bangkok, Thailand

== Collections ==
- Australian National Gallery, Canberra
- Art Gallery of New South Wales
- National Gallery of Victoria
- Queensland Art Gallery
- Mildura Arts Centre
- Newcastle City Art Gallery
- State College of Victoria at Burwood
- Australian National University, Canberra, ‘in the Pursuit of Knowledge’, courtyard of the Physics Building, 1962.
