= Centre Five =

Australian Modernist sculptor group

Centre Five was a group of seven modernist sculptors formed in 1960/61 to raise awareness of, and change attitudes to, contemporary abstract sculpture in Australia amongst architects, state galleries and the public. These efforts involved exhibitions, lectures, and lobbying for a percent-for-the-arts program for public buildings, and fellowships for sculpture. Their foundational five-point program, from which the name Centre Five derives, stated their aim ‘to foster a closer relationship with architects." The group was active between 1958 to 1974.

== Origin ==
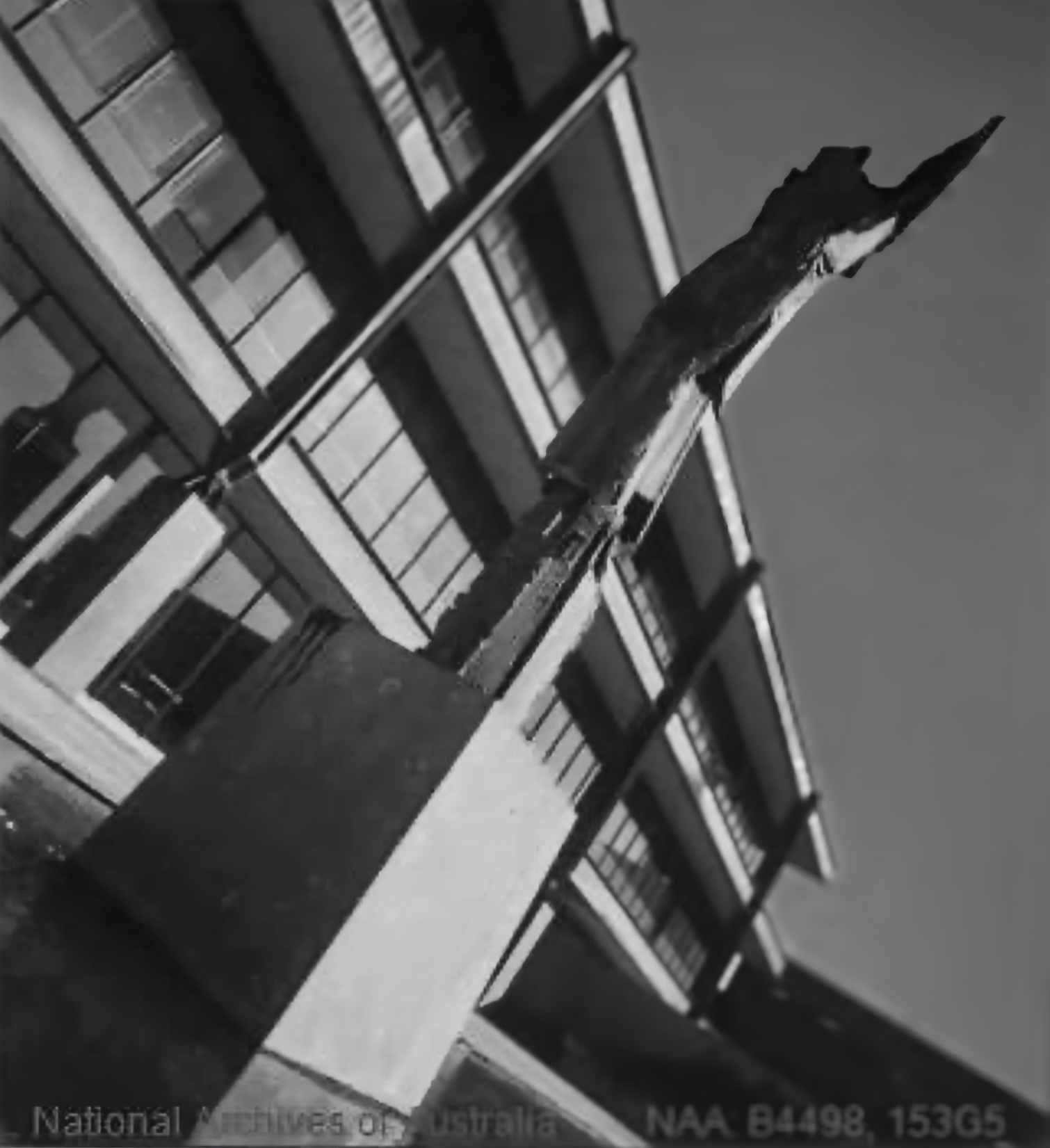
Inge King (1965) Eurydice, sited at BHP Melbourne Research Laboratories, Clayton. Courtesy National Archives Australia

A collective named Group of Four, or Centre Four, had been founded in 1953 by Hungarian-born Julius Kane, with Clifford Last, Norma Redpath and German-born Inge King. In June 1953 they exhibited together in the University of Melbourne’s School of Architecture, with the cooperation of Professor Brian Lewis first Chair of Architecture, and again showed there in June 1955 with a growing architectural emphasis.

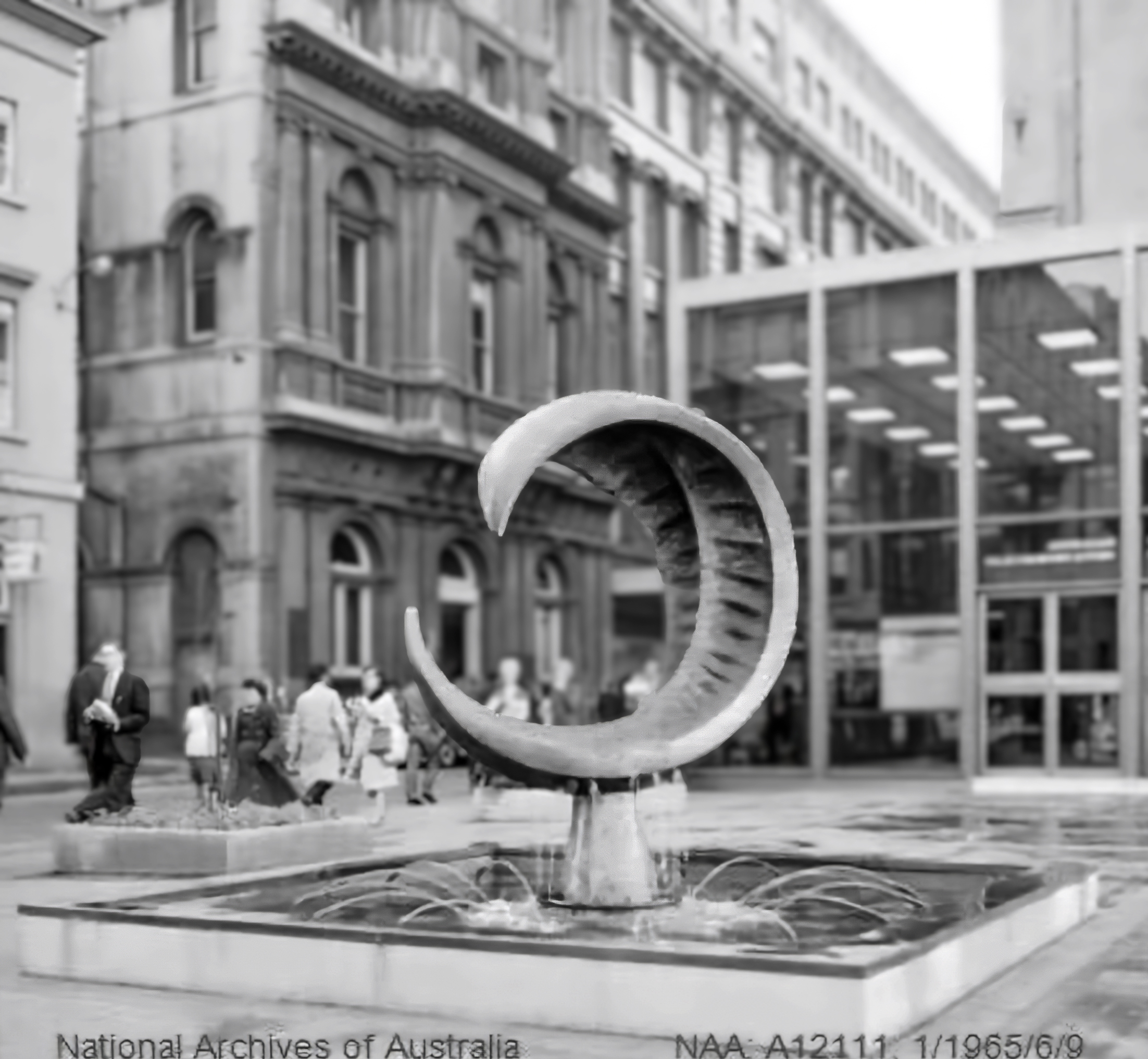
Teisutis Zikaras abstract sculpture cnr. Little Bourke and Elizabeth Streets, Melbourne.Courtesy National Archives Australia

In 1956 Kane, Last, Redpath and Teisutis Zikaras exhibited at the Melbourne University's Wilson Hall during the Melbourne Olympics, displaying sculpture alongside photographs of contemporary architecture. In 1957, Zikaras was commissioned by Eggleston, MacDonald & Secomb for eight identical low-relief cement panels composed of interwoven forms for Melbourne University's Union House, the first of the group's architectural collaborations. His Ornamental balustrade panels were relocated to the west end of Union House in 1998. In 1959 Six Sculptors, at the National Gallery of Victoria, included all of the eventual seven Centre Five members, except for Lenton Parr.

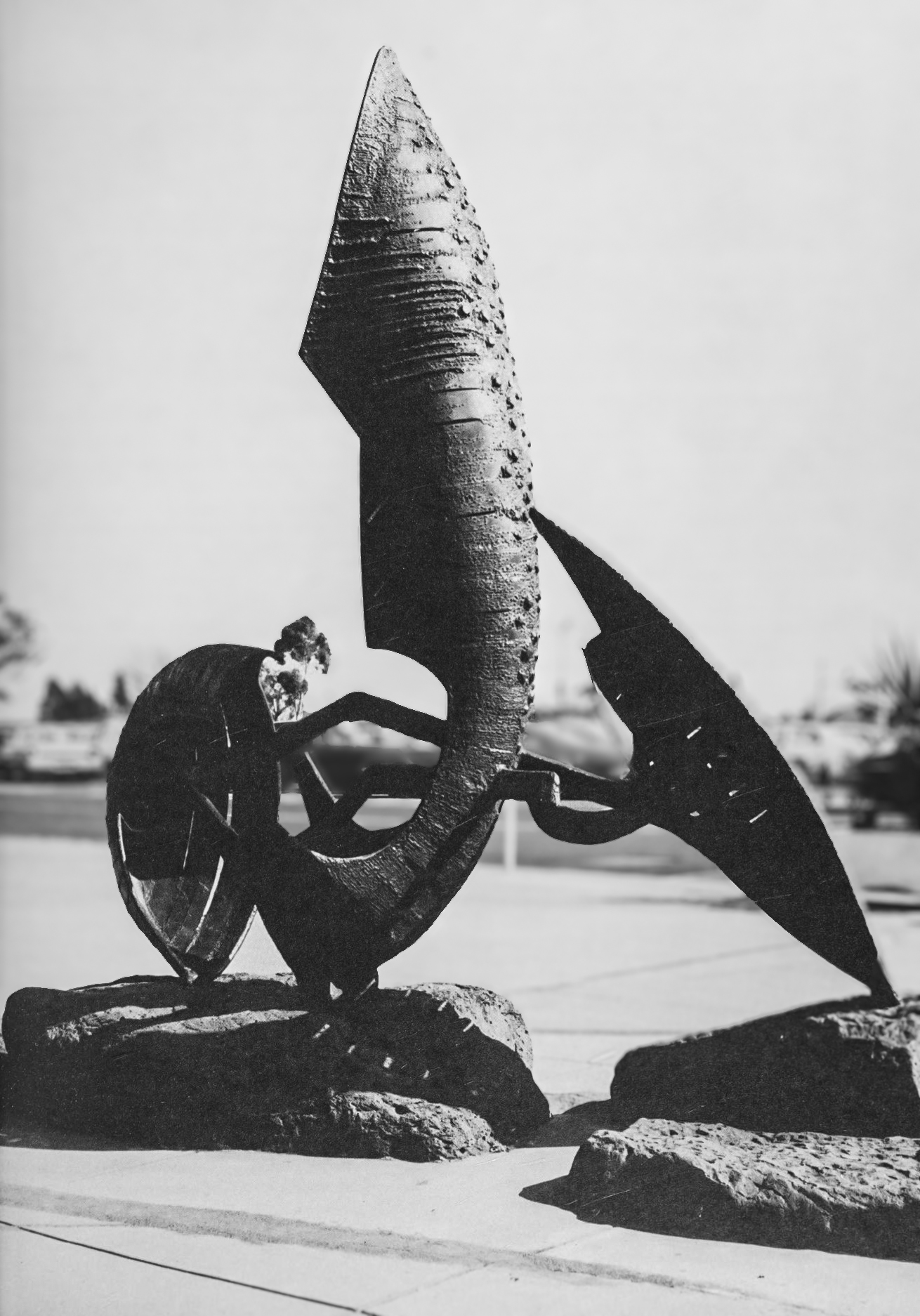
Lenton Parr (1959) Untitled welded mild steel. 259 × 259 cm. Chadstone Shopping Centre, Melbourne

Centre Five formed as a splinter group of the Victorian Sculptors' Society, adding members Lenton Parr, Vincas Jomantas, and Teisutis Zikaras. Inge King noted that Kane's work "still showed the influence of German Classicism prevalent in the 1920s and 1930s." Clifford Last remembered that Kane was the sculptor who conceptualised the Centre Five Group of sculptors by drafting their five point programme as well as "generating a militancy that never was regained." The five points, as Eckett proposes, were most likely drafted in 1961, but first published only in 1973 in a Geelong Art Gallery catalogue. It declared their intentions:

1. to bridge the gap between artist and public through individual and group activities, including exhibitions and lectures, radio and television appearances, newspaper and magazine articles;
2. to seek better representation in the National Art Galleries of Australia;
3. to foster a closer relationship with architects;
4. to publicise the need in Australia for an art development policy similar to that in other countries based on the principle of devoting a percentage of public building costs to works of art;
5. to seek assistance in creating more scholarships and fellowships for sculptors.

The result of their agitations was that in 1961 and 1962 Centre Five gained commissions with Parr receiving the first for the ANU Chemistry School with further to follow. The 1962 Conference of Victorian Sculptors at the National Gallery of Victoria, was attended by all Centre Five members, though without Kane who died by suicide earlier that year, and Redpath who was in Milan on an Italian government scholarship.

The first of the explicitly named Centre Five exhibitions was that held in September 1963 at Newcastle Art Gallery.

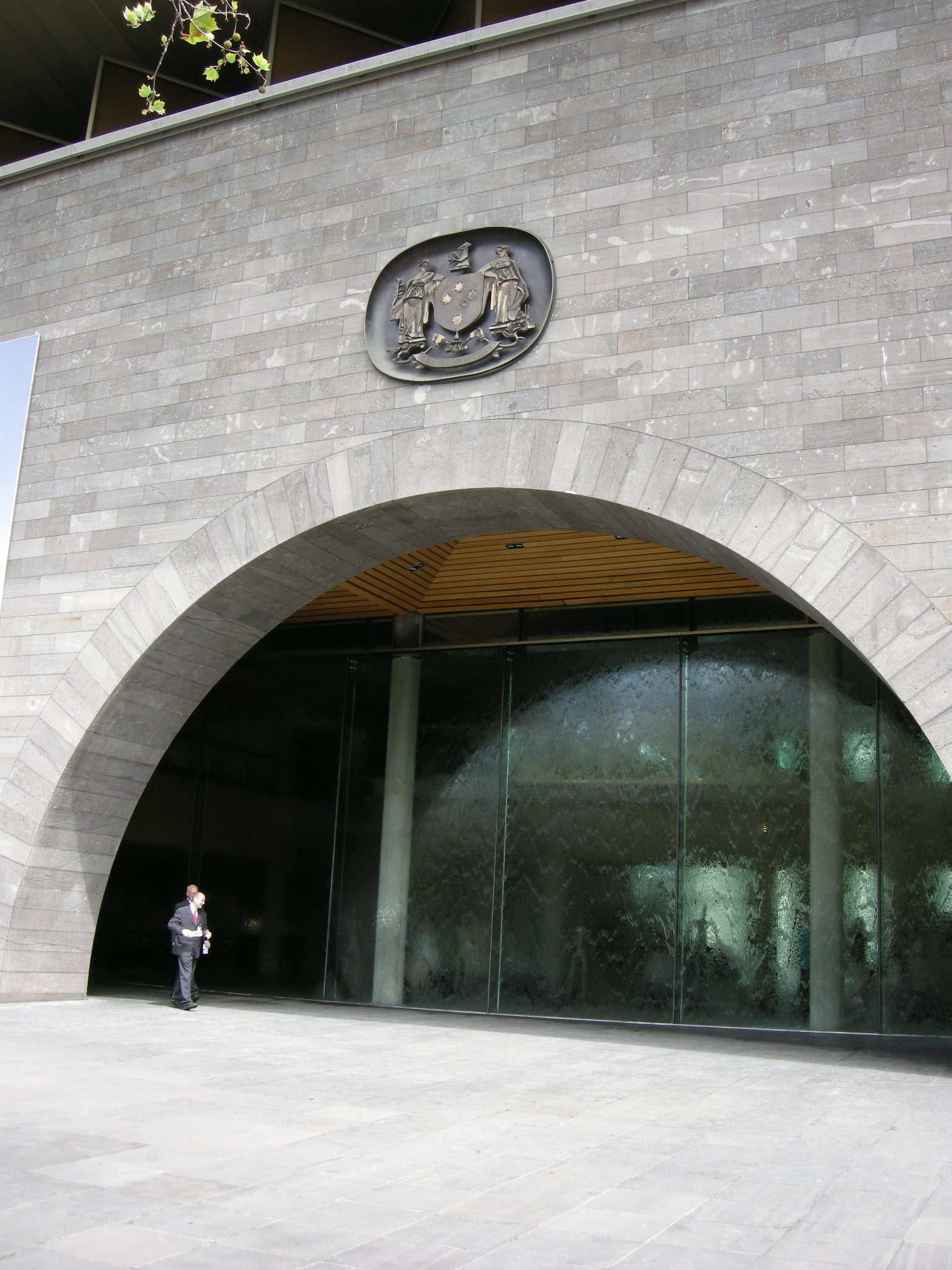
Norma Redpath (c.1968) Victorian coat of arms, floating relief in bronze on oval paten. National Gallery of Victoria

Redpath resigned her membership in 1964 due to work commitments in Milan. Despite the loss of Kane and Redpath, the group continued to exhibit as Centre Five, firstly at Kym Bonython's Hungry Horse Gallery, Paddington.

== Context ==
The project was problematic in that the group had resigned from the Victorian Sculptors' Society and in effect set themselves up as competition. This caused a split in the small sculpture world of the time. Due to the nature of the split, the Society – formed to promote the work of members – missed out on official consideration.

Four shared an immigrant background, having migrated to Australia within a period of three years—Jomantas in 1948, Zikaras and Kane in 1949 and King in 1951. These sculptors' "first-hand experience of sophisticated European practice" brought a "critical edge to Australian sculpture."

Similarities in characteristics of their individual styles made exhibiting together an advantage. Their aim was to inform the Australian public and architects about the role of modern sculpture. Ken Scarlett cites Lenton Parr's 1963 "well-informed article on Australian sculpture" in Art and Australia as raising awareness, while in October 1968, Lynn parodied architects' outmoded attitudes to the medium. Clifford Last, interviewed in 1965 by de Berg, explained:

I work with a group of sculptors, Centre Five...we have worked together for four years. When you work with a group, you can ask for things, you can project yourself as a group where you couldn't as an individual but we promote all sculpture not just our own. We've realised a lack of interest mainly from the architects and a lack of usage in their projects. It's something we've attempted to fight in many ways, we've lectured at universities, we've had our studios open for students to come, we've gathered collections of slides and made them available for schools and institutions, which has rather been working for sculpture rather than for Centre Five...

== Reception ==
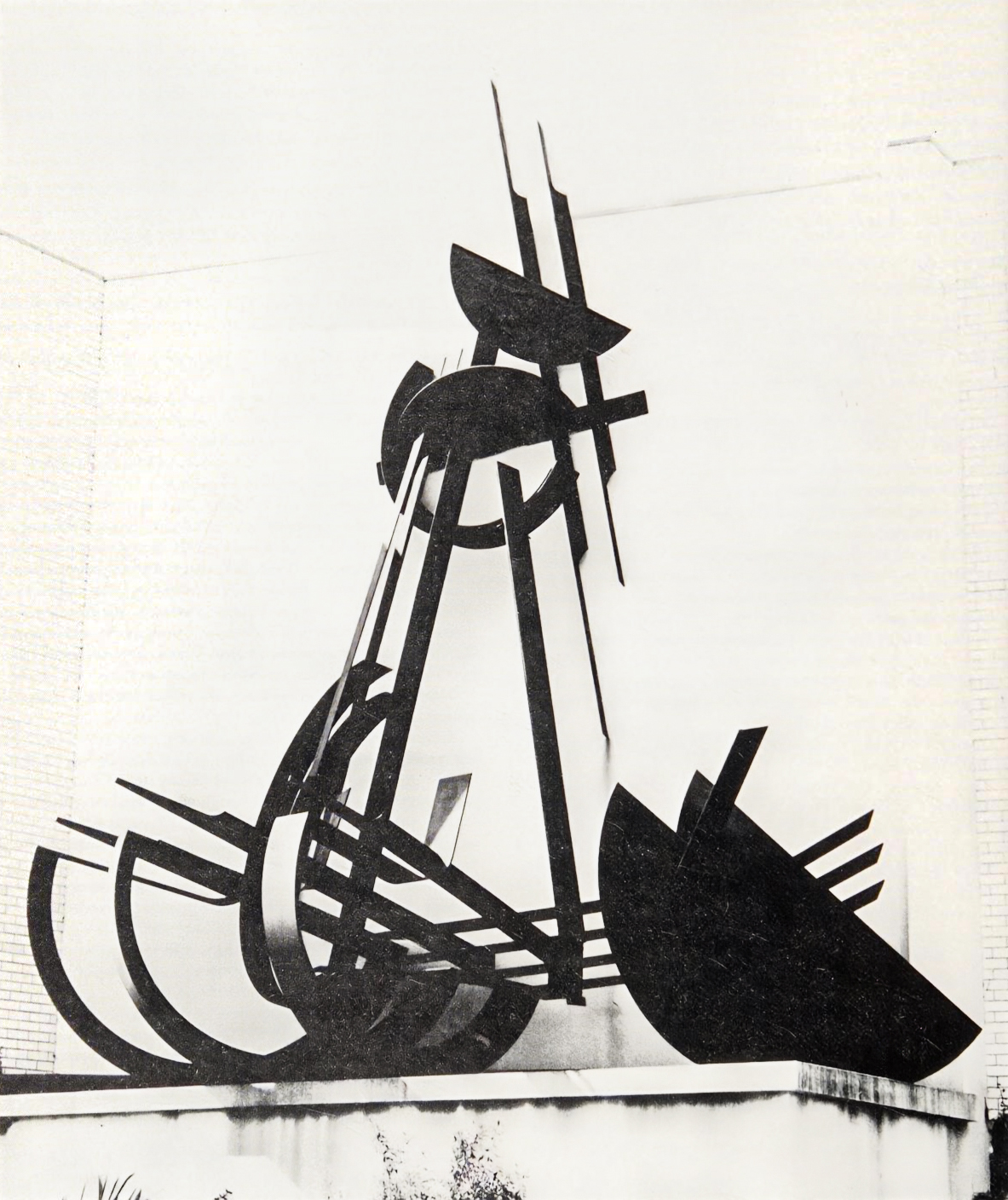
Lenton Parr (1970) Astra. Welded steel painted black. 1006 × 762 × 335 cm photographed in-situ, Astrojet Building, Melbourne Airport

Scarlett notes that public galleries "had neglected Australian sculpture, with none having a representative collection;" It was not until 1959 that the first large scale exhibition of work by contemporary local sculptors, entitled Six Sculptors, was held at the National Gallery of Victoria. The work was mostly from the Centre Five group, which later showed at the Newcastle City Art Gallery in 1963, though when in 1964 the group organised a large exhibition in Sydney, it attracted lacklustre reviews, particularly those by James Gleeson, though Wallace Thornton was more generous. When they exhibited at the Art Gallery of New South Wales in 1965, Lynn wrote that Centre Five exerted a "Diffusionist" approach as a pressure group, "gradually effecting a Fabian revolution in aesthetic tastes..."; i.e. instead of being rebellious, they collectively and strategically habituated the public's conservative taste toward modernist abstract sculpture by inserting it into public architecture. By 1966 however, Lynn, a painter, suggested that exposure of sculpture had reached 'saturation point'.

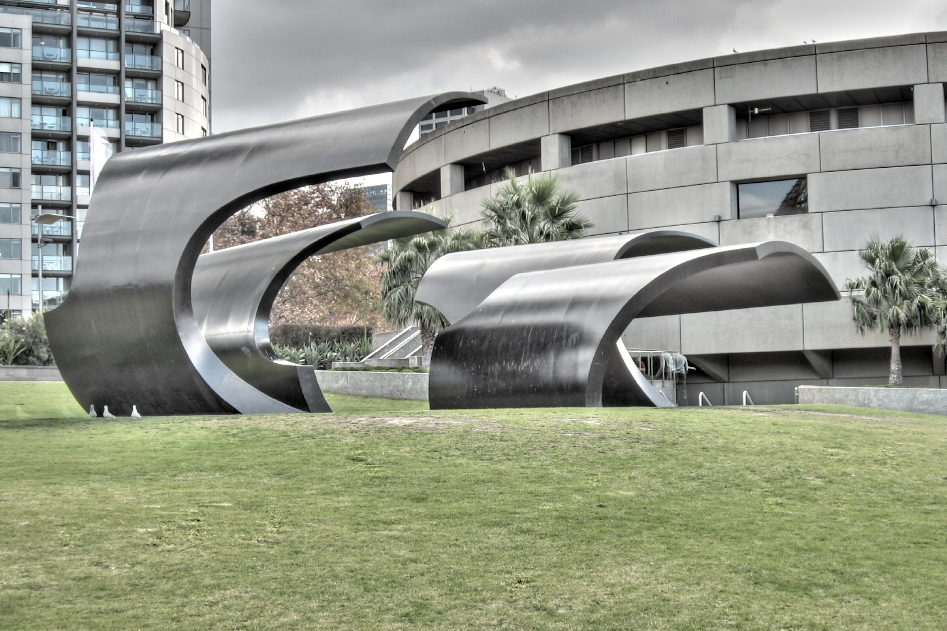
Inge King (1972–74) Forward surge, 50mm mild steel, paint, 516 x 1514 x 1368cm. Commissioned by the William Angliss Art Fund, 1976

Saunders, writing in Art and Australia contemporaneously with Centre Five’s early development emphasises that the group “do not regard themselves as a school of sculpture” and that there was little evidence of direct influence among its members on the others. The five members at the time of his 1966 article were Jomantas, whom Gleeson declared the "most experimental", King, Last, Parr and Zikaras. Julius Kane had died at the time of his writing, and Saunders distinguishes their practices rather than treating Centre Five as having a unified style. King constructed in steel mass planes that encouraged changing viewpoints; Last carved in wood the human/animal figure, paired forms, and emphasised light by deeply articulating edges; Parr created spatial structures in steel, responding to architectural commissions with semi-surrealist imagery of machinery and armour; Zikaras modelled and cast in experimental materials and metallic surfaces and increasingly forceful anatomical incision; while Jomantas was experimental with material, and carved/constructed volumes emphasising negative space and the integration of sculpture with its surrounding environment.

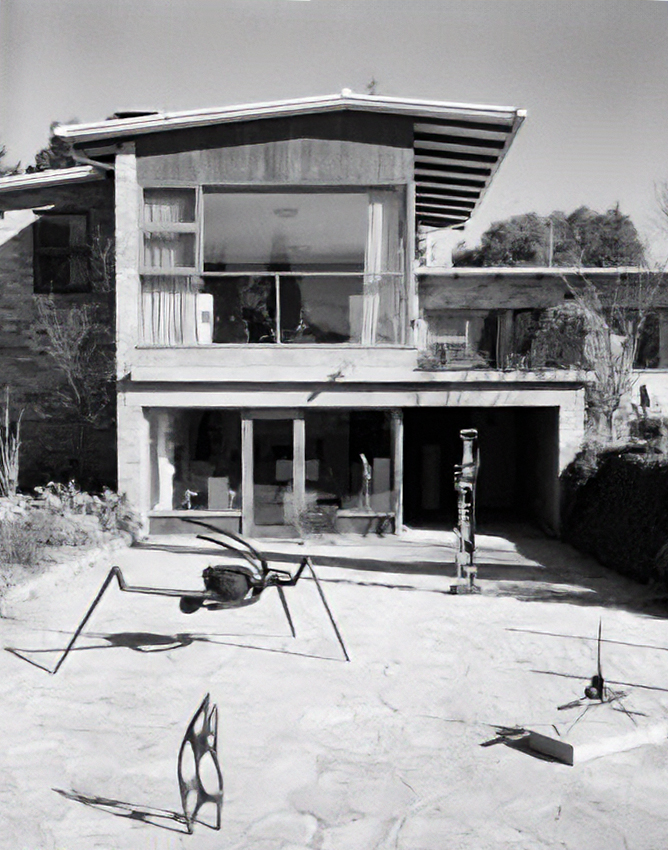
Australian Sculpture Centre, Canberra, 1966. Clifford Last The Lovers (front), Lenton Parr Armageddon (mid-ground) and untitled (right) and Alan Inghar Kingpost (rear). Courtesy National Archives Australia

What brought the group together, Saunders writes, was a shared professional and intellectual interest in sculpture's relationship to architecture in the mutual intrinsic affinity of these disciplines in dealing with solid form, designed space and materials such as wood, stone, clay, metal, plastics and glass, and sharing an aesthetic sensibility, favouring simplicity over ornamentation, and a social purpose in influencing human experience of the built environment. To that date in Australia, he asserts, the two professions had rarely collaborated. He identifies Melbourne architectural practices Bates Smart McCutcheon and Eggleston Macdonald and Secomb as actively commissioning sculptors, with the latter incorporating sculpture into at least eighteen projects in Melbourne and Canberra. Members of Centre Five were repeatedly among their collaborators. Thus, in the early 1960s for this group sculpture was not necessarily conceived as an autonomous gallery object. Saunders advocates for sculpture as part of “public, common experience”, and sculptors contributing directly to architectural design.

Members of the group, Norma Redpath, Inge King and Lenton Parr, were among six invited sculptors, each receiving a fee of $750 (value A$11,680.00 in 2025) to make a maquette of a free-standing, aluminium dividing screen for the 1968 'Comalco Invitation Award for Sculpture in Aluminium', with a prize of $3,000 (valued about A$50,000 in 2025). Five finally submitted work which was judged at the National Gallery of Victoria and exhibited at Bonython Gallery in November. Judges Eric Westbrook, Tony Tuckson, and architect R. M. Simpson, went to a fourth Centre Five member Vincas Jomantas.

Scarlett notes that Centre Five "aroused some criticism from sculptors and art critics, who saw it as a pressure group, working for the interests of a small group of sculptors, rather than for sculpture in Australia", but considers, in retrospect, that sculpture as a discipline gained by their "determined promotion".

== Influence and legacy ==
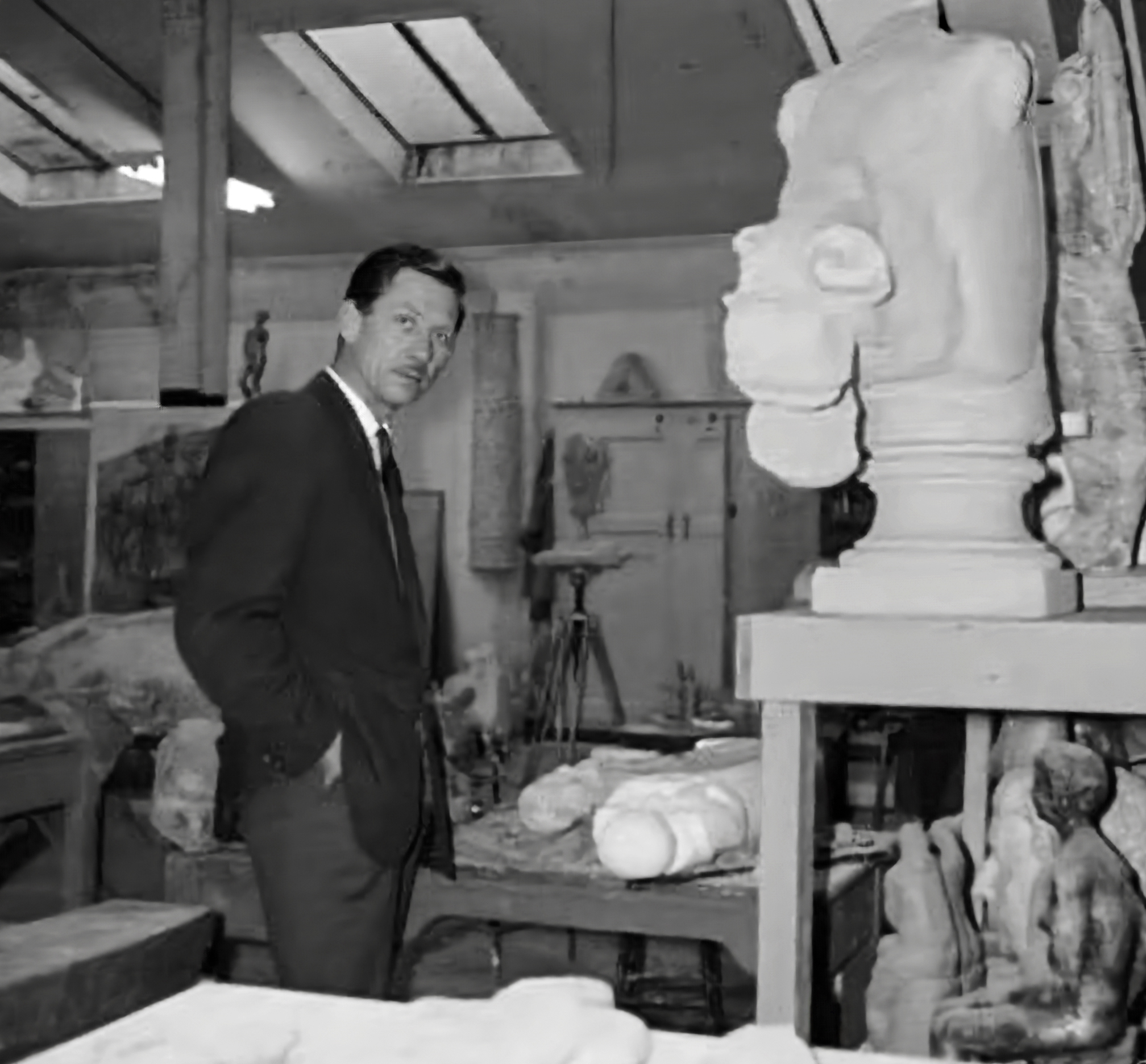
Sculpture lecturer Mr Teisutis Zikaras amidst student works, School of Sculpture of the Royal Melbourne Institute of Technology

Four of the Five were teachers in 1966, with Last having only recently left teaching. As Head of Sculpture at RMIT (1964–66), then Head of Prahran College of Technology(1966–1969), Parr was an acknowledged influence on students including Kevin Mortensen and Jock Clutterbuck, though when his fine art philosophy clashed with the vocationally-oriented aims of the Prahran College Principal Alan Warren, he resigned. Parr went on to become Principal at the National Gallery School (1969-1974), and later director (1974–84) of the Victorian College of the Arts.

Plant in 1971 marked the contribution of the group to modern sculpture in Australia in her essay in a history of the Victorian Artists Society, Christesen's The Gallery on Eastern Hill. Burke notes in Meanjin that "the Centre Five group were soundly represented" by Inge King and Lenton Parr as late as April 1973 at the Mildura Sculpture Triennial 'Sculpturscape' .

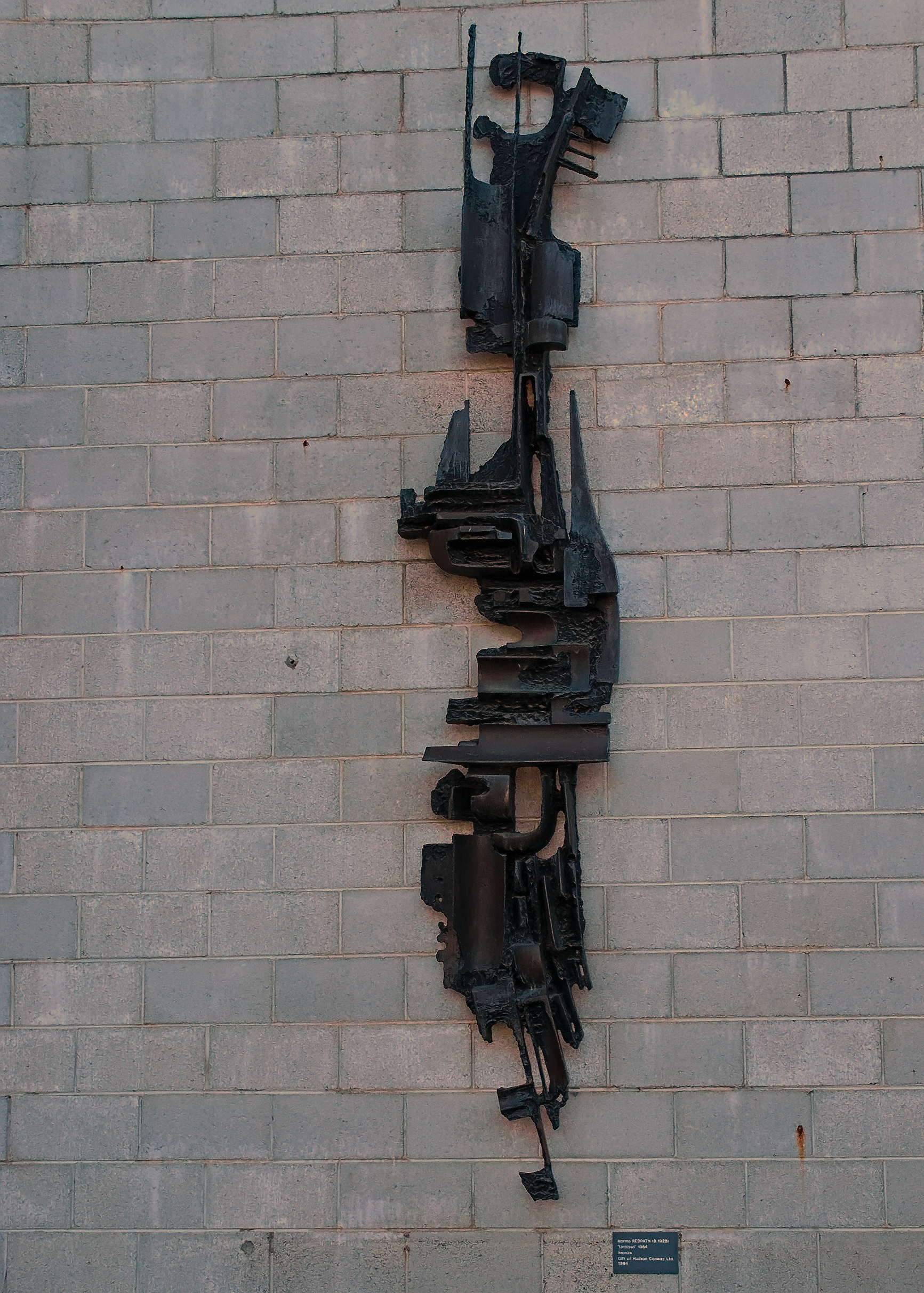
Norma Redpath (1964) Untitled, bronze wall relief. McClelland Gallery and Sculpture Park.

Eckett in the catalogue for Centre 5: bridging the gap, 12 November 2022–5 March 2023, acknowledges Centre 5's assistance to McClelland Gallery's inaugural director Carl Andrew and its benefactor Dame Elisabeth Murdoch AC DBE from its inception in 1971, with Last and Parr serving on its art advisory committee to assist in achieving an environment sympathetic to exhibiting sculpture. They last exhibited new work together in Geelong Art Gallery in 1973, and at McClelland in 1974.

As part of the Australian Sculpture Now extended exhibitions, in 1984-85, Maudie Palmer organised Centre Five at Heide, an installation surveying the group's 1960s works at Heide Park and Art Gallery.

== Selected exhibitions ==
- 1963, 1–30 September: Sculpture by Centre Five: Jomantas, King, Last, Parr, Redpath, Zikaris. Newcastle City Art Gallery
- 1965, 6–31 October: Art Gallery of New South Wales
- 1966, from 18 April: Centre Five Sculpture Group. Kym Bonython's Hungry Horse Art Gallery
- 1968, 18 March– 3 April: Melbourne Sculptors. King, Last and Parr only. Bonython Art Gallery, Paddington
- 1973–4, November–February: Centre 5. Jomantas, King, Last, Parr and Zikaras. McClelland Gallery, Langwarrin
- 1973, 7 September–2 November: Centre Five. Geelong Art Gallery
- 1984, 27 October–9 December: Centre Five at Heide. Heide Park and Art Gallery
- 2022/23, 12 November–5 March: Centre 5: bridging the gap. McClelland Sculpture Park + Gallery, Langwarrin
