= Tina Haim-Wentscher =

German-Australian sculptor (1887–1974)

- Born: Tina Haim; 17 December 1887; Constantinople, Osmanian Empire
- Died: 21 April 1974 (aged 86); St Kilda, Melbourne, Australia
- Occupation: Sculptor
- Spouse(s): Julius Wentscher (1881-1961)
- Parent(s): David Leon Haim; Rebecca Mondolfo

Tina Haim-Wentscher (sometimes called Tina Haim-Wentcher) (17 December 1887 – 21 April 1974) was a German-Australian sculptor.

== Life ==
Tina Haim-Wentscher was born in 1887 in Constantinople, the daughter of Serbian merchant David Leon Haim and his Italian wife Rebecca Mondolfo. The family belonged to the Turkish-Sephardi Jews. The family came to Vienna and in 1893 to Berlin, where Tina Haim studied sculpture at the Lewin-Funcke-School in Charlottenburg in 1907 and 1908, and then ran her own studio. From 1912 to 1914, she studied in Paris, where her works attracted the interest of the sculptor Auguste Rodin. With a bust of her sister, her first work, she participated in an exhibition of the Berlin Secession. A long-standing friendship linked her to the sculptor Käthe Kollwitz.

In 1914, she married the Berlin painter Julius Wentscher (1881-1961). From 1921 the couple undertook study trips to Greece, Italy, Egypt and a longer trip to Bali and Java in 1931/32. From 1927 to 1931, she was a member of the Association of Berlin Artists. In 1933, they decided on the advice of Käthe Kollwitz not to return to Germany because of the deteriorating situation for Jews. They stayed in China (1932–33) and Indonesia (1933–34) and in around 1935/36 in Siam and Cambodia, 1936-37 in Singapore and 1936/40 in Malaysia.

With the outbreak of World War II, the couple was deported in 1940 as "Enemy Aliens" to Australia, where they were interned until 1942 in Tatura, Victoria. After release they settled in Melbourne, received Australian citizenship in 1946, and anglicized their name to "Wentcher". Tina Haim-Wentcher joined the Melbourne Society of Women Painters and Sculptors, and in 1958 she was awarded the "Interstate Sculptors Prize" of Newcastle, New South Wales. Her charitable work for the Royal Children's Hospital in Melbourne led to a close friendship with the philanthropist Dame Elisabeth Murdoch (1909-2012), the mother of media mogul Rupert Murdoch. Tina Haim-Wentcher died in 1974 in Melbourne at the age of 87.

== Work ==
In 1920, the art patron Henri James Simon gave the Egyptian Museum of Berlin, among other pieces, the bust of the Egyptian queen Nefertiti, the most famous exhibit of his collection. Simon had financed the excavations of Ludwig Borchardt in the Egyptian Amarna and brought the artifacts to Germany. Heinrich Schäfer, director of the Egyptian Museum, greatly appreciated the works of Tina Haim. He commissioned her in 1913 to make a detailed copy of the bust. She made two copies in artificial stone for Wilhelm II, German Emperor and James Simon. In the early 1920s Haim-Wentscher once again made a model bust of Nefertiti, which was used for many years for molding all subsequent replicas.

Tina Haim-Wentscher together with her husband designed the artistic decoration of the Malaysian pavilion for the Empire Exhibition, Scotland 1938 in Glasgow. The decorations were made in the form of ten dioramas with life-size stone figures in front of landscapes.

Sculptures by her are in the National Gallery of Victoria, Melbourne; the National Gallery of Australia, Canberra; the Art Gallery of New South Wales in Sydney; Art Gallery of Western Australia, Perth; Art Gallery of Ballarat; and McClelland Gallery and Sculpture Park, Langwarrin, Victoria, among others.

== Selected works ==
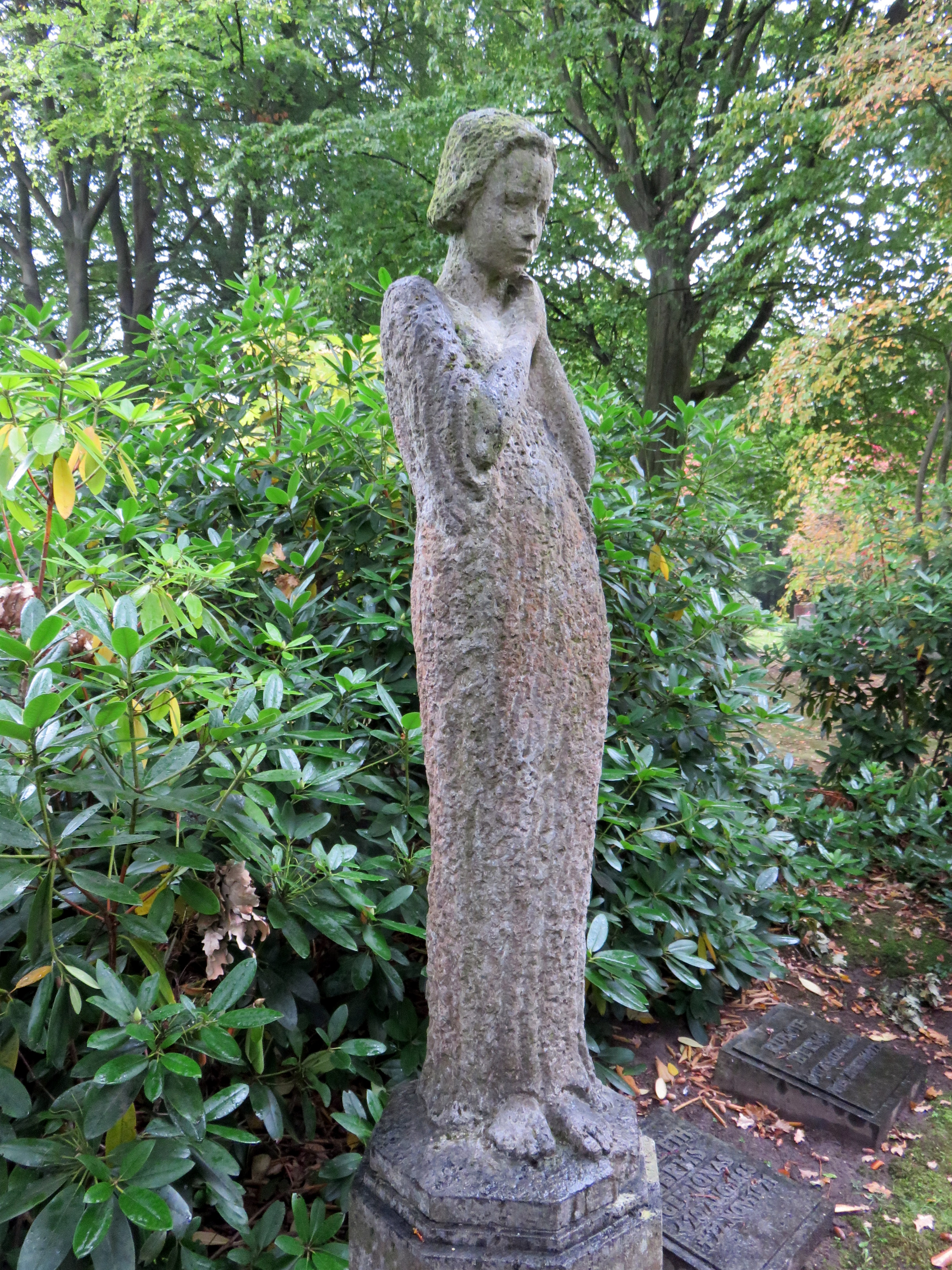
Grave Levison Hamburg

Selection of works produced in Germany prior to 1931

- Nefertiti Bust (replica) 1913, plaster, Staatliche Museen zu Berlin
- Bust of Adolf Erman 1915, bronze, Staatliche Museen zu Berlin – Preußischer Kulturbesitz, Nationalgalerie
- Der Geiger Bronisław Huberman 1916, bronze, Staatliche Museen zu Berlin
- Grave sculpture Levison 1923, Ohlsdorf Cemetery, Hamburg
- Bust of Käthe Kollwitz 1926, tonmergel (clay-marl), Staatliche Museen zu Berlin
- Bust of James Simon 1931, bronze, Leo Baeck Institut, LBI Art Collection, New York City
- Head of a Besharin Boy (Bessarabian Boy) 1929, pewter, National Gallery of Victoria, Melbourne

Selection of works produced in South East Asia 1931—1947

- Balinese Woman c1932, wax, National Gallery of Australia, Canberra
- Indonesian Boy c1932, ceramic University of Melbourne
- Bust of Gao Qifeng, Hong Kong Heritage Museum
- Indonesian Dancer Squatting c1934, bronze, Old Parliament House, Singapore (plaster in McClelland Sculpture Park and Gallery, Melbourne)
- Relief Portrait of the Sultan KGPAA Mangkunegara VII and his wife 1934, Mangkunegara Palace, Solo, Indonesia
- Tamil Boy 1937, bronze, Geelong Art Gallery, Australia

Selection of works produced in Australia 1947—

- Sir Daryl Lindsay 1943, plaster, Art Gallery of Ballarat
- The Spirit of Classical Greece 1945, plaster, University of Melbourne
- Mother and Child c1950, walnut, McClelland Sculpture Park and Gallery, Melbourne
- Lelong Dancer, Bali 1953, lead, Art Gallery of Western Australia
- Head of Hephzibah Menuhin 1953, plaster, Haileybury College, Melbourne
- Young Foal 1954, bronze, Art Gallery of New South Wales
- Jacaranda 1957, wood, Newcastle Region Art Gallery

== Exhibitions ==
- 1987: Tina Wentcher 1887–1974: A Centennial Exhibition, Melbourne
- 2017: Tina Haim – Tina Haim-Wentscher – Tina Wentcher Sculptor: 1887–1974, McClelland Sculpture Park and Gallery

== See also ==
- List of German women artists
