= Clifford Last =

English sculptor

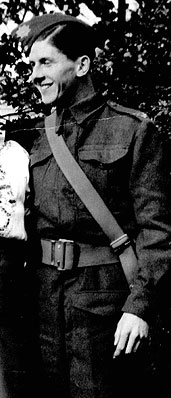
- Born: Barrow-in-Furness
- Died: Melbourne
- Occupation: Sculptor
- Mother: Nella Last
- Awards: Order of the British Empire (Arts, Mr Clifford Frank LAST, 1976)

Clifford Frank Last OBE (13 December 1918 – 20 October 1991) was an Australian modernist sculptor. Born in Barrow in Furness, England, he was the son of Nella Last, author of a World War II diary on which the TV film Housewife, 49 was based.

== Early life ==
Clifford Last was the younger son of Nella and William Last. He had an older brother, Arthur. After war service in which he lost his closest companion and was injured himself, he trained in art and emigrated to Melbourne, Australia in 1947, and soon became a noted sculptor. He has recently been read as a gay artist on the basis of archival material held at the State Library Victoria. His work is in the collections of the National Gallery of Australia, the National Gallery of Victoria, Art Gallery of Ballarat, Mildura Art Gallery, Newcastle Art Gallery, Castlemaine Art Gallery, and University College Melbourne University.

== Centre Five group ==
Last was a foundation member of Centre Five, a group formed in 1960 to promote contemporary abstract sculpture in Australia. The group, originally called Centre Four, was founded in 1953 by Hungarian-born Julius Kane, featuring Last, Norma Redpath and German-born Inge King. Centre Five was a splinter group of the Victorian Sculptors' Society comprising members Clifford Last, Inge King, Vincas Jomantas, Teisutis Zikaras, Julius Kane and Lenton Parr. They shared common characteristics in their style and felt that exhibiting together would be to their advantage. Their aim was to foster the understanding of modern sculpture among Australian architects and the public.

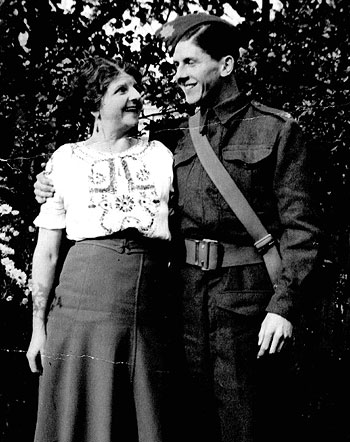
A young Clifford Last with his mother Nella

The project was problematic in that they had resigned from the Victorian Sculptors' Society and in effect set themselves up as competition. The result was a severe split in the very small sculpture world of the time, the repercussions of which are still felt today. Due to the nature of the split, the Society – formed to promote the work of members – missed out on official consideration. Last later was a member of the Commonwealth Art Advisory Board.

== Work ==
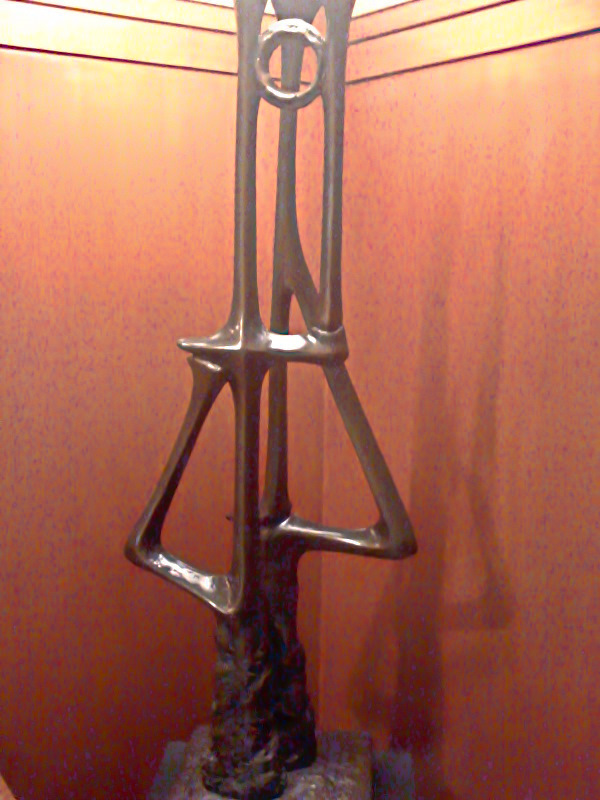
"Family", 1971

Materials with which Last worked included marble, bronze, slate, wood and aluminium. Using marble as his favoured medium, Last furthered his studies at the Royal Melbourne Institute of Technology. Last’s work of the 1950s resembled other modernist sculpture in Australia at that time in its abstracted but instantly recognisable figurative forms, but on becoming deeply involved with the Theosophy Movement in the early 1960s, his work became more idiosyncratic as he worked predominately in local timbers. He employed attenuated shapes that he believed demonstrated the emotions existing in family groups and explored mystical references. His work transformed again in the 1970s into assemblages of found geometric forms often referencing Jungian archetypes.

Last preferred the work to speak for itself and, unless asked, opted not to go into detail. He carved wood such as jarrah, using, for example, the cruciform shape in relativistic relationships which left interpretation open. One such form could refer to animals, plants, icons, people or groups.

A fine example of his large-scale bronzes entitled "Family" was commissioned by the Government of Australia, in 1971, as an official gift to the international organization, Asian Development Bank, which displays it in its headquarters in Manila.
