= Teisutis Zikaras =

Australian sculptor

Teisutis 'Joe' Zikaras (often spelled "Tesutis") (5 July 1922 – 10 May 1991) was an Australian sculptor born in Panevėžys, Lithuania.

== Early life and education ==
Zikaras earned a diploma at the School of Fine Arts, Kaunas, Lithuania, where his father Juozas, creator of Lithuania's famous Liberty statue, was Head. He left Lithuania after its takeover by Russia and spent two years (1946–48) teaching drawing and sculpture at a campus of the École des Arts et Métiers in Freiburg, Germany, an art school for Lithuanian refugees where Aleksandras Marčiulionis was a principal.

He was one of the artists who contributed to the 1949 Lithuanian Art Exhibition held in Freiburg with Paulius Augius, Juozas Bakis, Alfonsas Dargis, Povilas Kaufmanas, Viktoras Petravicius, Vaclovas Ratas, Adolfas Vaicaitis, Adolfas Valeska, Telesforas Valius, Liudas Vilimas and Viktoras Vizgirda.

== Career ==
Zikaras was accepted by Australia as a 'DP' (displaced person), arriving in Melbourne in 1949. From 1952 to 1956, he was employed as a sculptor on the Melbourne War Memorial. He proceeded to become Lecturer in Sculpture at the Royal Melbourne Institute of Technology. His surviving commissioned work includes the sculpture for the courtyard of the ETA Foods Factory in Braybrook, Victoria.

He was a member of the Victorian Sculptors' Society and with Anita Aarons, Ola Cohn, Vincas Jomantas, Inge King, Julius Kane, Clifford Last, Clement Meadmore, Andor Mészáros, Lenton Parr, Günther Stein, Tina Wentcher, Zikaras exhibited at Brummels Gallery in Twelve Melbourne Sculptors (1957), opened by Neil Clerehan (who himself held a sculpture show there that year, when the gallery separately showed drawings by Zikaras. Around 1960, he joined with Clifford Last, Inge King, Vincas Jomantas and Lenton Parr to form a splinter group which exhibited together as the 'Centre Five'. In 1967 they split from the Society, which never recovered from the departure of so many of its prominent members.

According to Australian art critic Alan McCulloch Zikaras "was raised in the tradition of peasant wood-carvings, many of which were hung on trees. This influence accounts for the flatness, the two-dimensional quality in the work not only of Zikaras but also in that of many other Lithuanian sculptors."

== Oral History ==
Zikaras was interviewed by Hazel de Berg in 1965 about his work and early training. This recording can be found at the National Library of Australia.
