= Mildura Sculpture Triennial =

Defunct national sculpture event in Australia 1961–1988

The Mildura Sculpture Triennials took place between 1961 and 1988. Inaugurated in 1961 as the Mildara Prize for Sculpture sponsored by the Mildara Winery, the next event was renamed the Mildura Sculpture Triennial. It was the first event in Australia that promoted large scale contemporary sculpture and incorporated site-specific installations and performance art in an innovative and often challenging program.

== Venue ==
Mildura, a regional agricultural centre on the Murray River in Victoria at the border of South Australia and New South Wales was well positioned to attract interstate visitors to the event despite its remoteness; "...the most unlikely place to sponsor the most way-out art exhibition yet held in Australia," (Nancy Borlase in The Bulletin) but as Elwyn Lynn noted; "that the Triennial, in an isolated city of 30,000, should take place at all, should attract fine entries from as far away as New Zealand and should find such local support are wonders."John Davies writing in Art and Australia on the Seventh Triennial reports on the influx of visitors to the festival;

Through its Triennial, the biggest regular survey of sculpture attempted in this country, Mildura attracts national and international attention. This year (25 March-28 May) was no exception. An estimated 1,200 artists, students and 'others' swarmed into Mildura's hotels, camping grounds and caravan parks for the opening ceremonies. Many left immediately afterwards, but for them as much as for those who stayed, or came later, the Triennial was a kind of pilgrimage, an opportunity to take stock of what is happening in Australian sculpture today.

== History ==
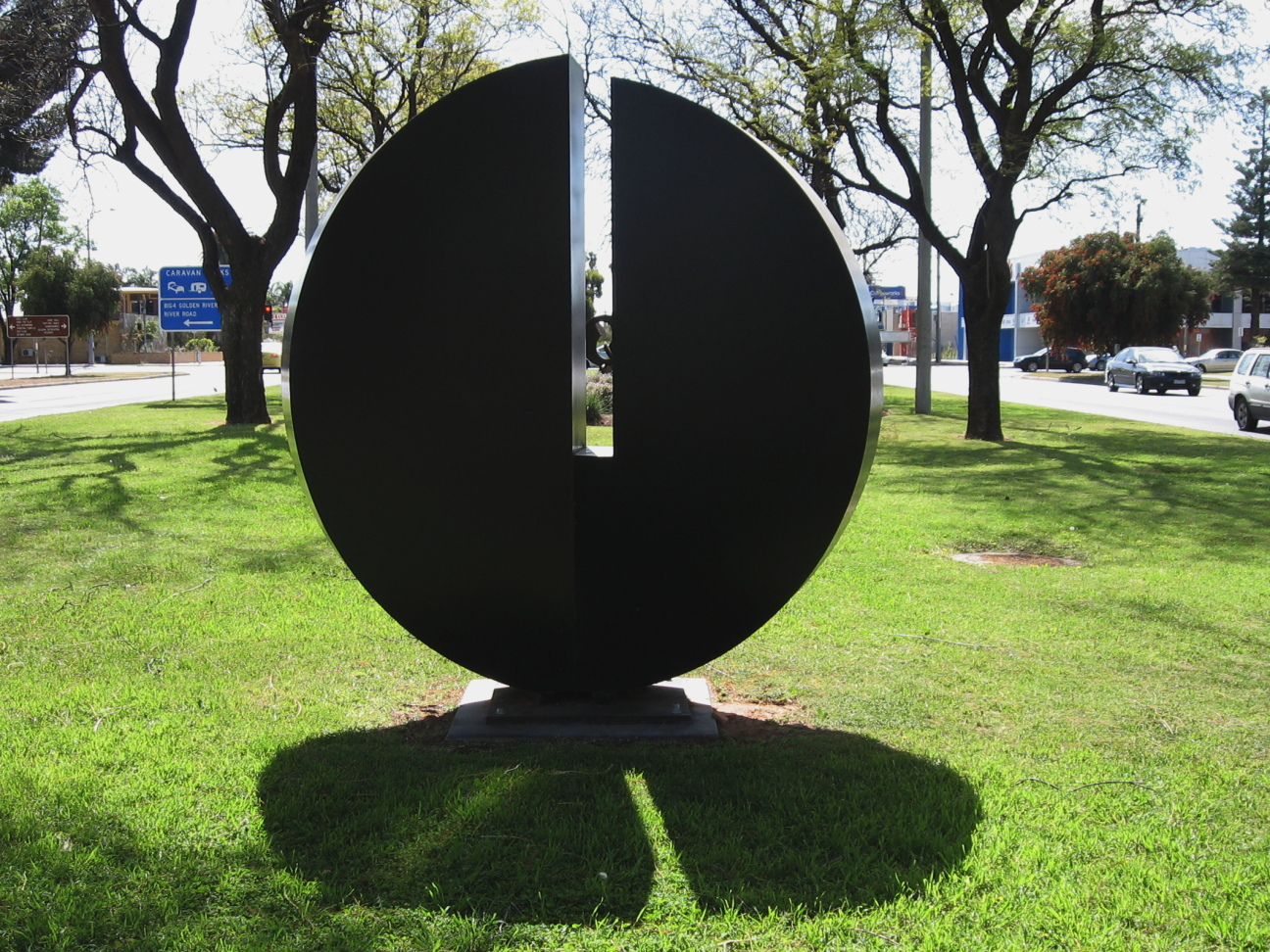
Inge King's Sculpture Black Sun 1975. Exhibited during the 6th Mildura Sculpture Exhibition (the 1975 Mildura sculpture triennial, an opening feature for Arts Victoria 75) and purchased for Mildura Arts Centre. Located on Deakin Avenue, between Eleventh and Twelfth Streets, Mildura. Steel, Painted Black, edition 2 239 X 208 x 72.

There were ten Triennials between 1961 and 1988. Eric van Hattum established this first national sculpture survey as the Mildara Prize for Sculpture in 1961 and managed the second event in 1964, with a name change to the Mildura Prize for Sculpture, and in 1970 it became the Mildura Sculpture Triennial, except in 1975, when it was rescheduled to coincide with Arts Victoria 75 and the title temporarily changed to Mildura Sculpture Exhibition. In 1975 Tom McCullough, introduced a sub-title, Sculpturescape, signifying an expansion of the exhibition area to include half a square kilometre of fenced river flats below the Rio Vista homestead to which the Art Centre is attached.

Artist and critic Elwyn Lynn, noting the innovative work in the 1970 Triennial, conceded "that sculpture exhibitions should be more imaginatively conceived and implemented than those of painting is here beyond conjecture."

Thomas (Tom) McCullough, directed the triennials until his controversial resignation in 1978, following which the Mildura Arts Centre and the Mildura City Council recommenced the triennials from 1982, directed by Michael Sourgnes, though at a smaller scale. By then there were alternate national, metropolitan events such as the Australian Sculpture Triennial established by McCullough in Melbourne (1981–1993), ANZART (1981–1985) developed by artist and curator Ian Hunter, Australian Perspecta (1981–1999) and the Biennale of Sydney (1973 onwards).

At the establishment of the Triennials in the 1960s, the market for modern sculpture in Australia was limited. Sculptor Jan Brown, who started exhibiting at Mildura in 1967, noted in a 1994 interview that "the triennial...had given artists a chance to have their works seen," including 14 sculptors from the Canberra district exhibiting there in 1988, with an increase to 40 of working sculptors in the Australian Capital Territory.

Expectations of a young growing population entering tertiary education in art schools, art history departments and art teacher training and rapid postwar developments in the Australian cultural sector and its institutions, as Anne Saunders has shown, can be traced in the evolution of these triennial events before, between 1978 and 1982, sculpture came to be no longer the favoured medium of an avant-garde engendering new types of art practice, and by 1981, events of national significance shifted to the metropolitan centres. In his review of the 1982 festival, Sasha Grishin detailed these changes, among them a new concern for the environment and a rejection of deconstruction for figuration;

The change in direction lies in the abandonment of more ephemeral forms of sculpture — in other words, the "twigs and feathers" school seems to have exhausted its once creative dominance. Also there is a general disillusionment in the Anthony Caro-like welded steel constructions as that particular dead-end alley has proven itself unproductive. Quite an exciting development in the use of metal is represented in David Wilson's piece, Place and Time, moving away from his earlier brutality of form, while the work of traditionalists in welded steel like Reg Parker and Robertson-Swann has a decisively dated appearance. The change in direction that Australian sculpture seems to be experiencing is not so much a leaning towards any particular style, but a major change in aesthetic attitudes. If the most important factors to emerge from the present Sydney Biennale are the sense of neo-conservativism in styles, a return to the idea of art as an aesthetic object and a return to the aesthetics of humanism, then these are corroborated by the exhibition in Mildura.

== Legacy ==
Charles Green concludes that "the Mildura Triennials marked a phase in the increasing public role of curators as mediators between artist and audience. This transition encouraged actively entrepreneurial taste-making," through a change from an award to an exhibition by invitation in a selection by McCulloch's peers in the tertiary art education sector

The Mildura Arts Centre was held in high regard for the success of its sculpture festival and this was reflected in increased prestige for the whole regional gallery network in Victoria.

Mildura inherited from the Triennial a significant number of permanent public sculptures displayed on the Mildura Arts Centre lawns and around the town.

The Mildura Palimpsest Biennale, launched in 1997, continued the lineage of the sculpture Triennial until its own tenth iteration in 2015. It was run by Arts Mildura, an independent not-for-profit community organisation which also conducts other arts festivals in the region.
