= Lenton Parr =

Australian sculptor (1924–2003)

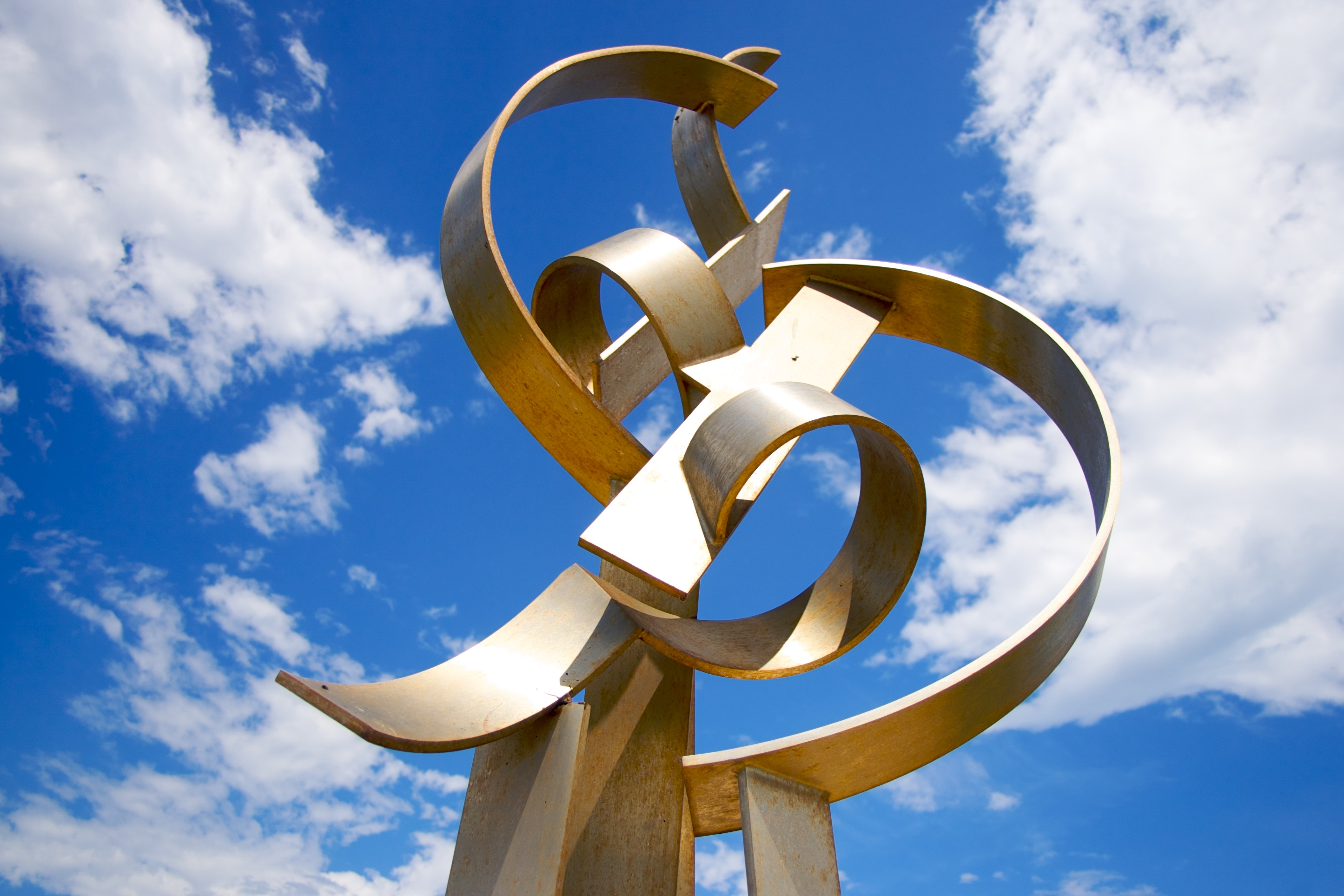
Windhover (2001) in Melbourne

Thomas Lenton Parr AM (11 September 1924 – 8 August 2003) was an Australian sculptor and teacher .

== Sculptor ==
Born in East Coburg, Victoria, Lenton Parr spent eight years in the Royal Australian Air Force (Svc No. A33223) before enrolling to study sculpture at the Royal Melbourne Technical College (now RMIT University), then worked in England 1955–57 as an assistant to Henry Moore. There he was influenced by Reg Butler and Eduardo Paolozzi to work with enamelled steel structures, which was to become his lifelong specialty. After his return to Melbourne he showed at Peter Bray Gallery in 1957, and embarked on a career in art education.

== Art educator ==
Parr was Head of Sculpture at RMIT (1964–66), then Head of Prahran College of Technology in a $1.5 million building completed as he arrived. He appointed staff who became influential Australian art and was held in high esteem by staff, but his fine art philosophy clashed with the vocationally-oriented aims of the College Principal Alan Warren, who acted unsuccessfully to have him removed by advertising his job, prompting an inquiry by the Minister. Though his appointment at Prahran was upheld, he left, effective 31 January 1969, to take up the role of Principal at the National Gallery School (1969-1974), leading to his appointment as director (1974–84) of the Victorian College of the Arts when it replaced the Gallery School

== Recognition ==
He was a member of the Victorian Sculptors' Society and its seventh president. Around 1960 he joined with Clifford Last, Inge King, Vincas Jomantas and Teisutis Zikaras to form a splinter group which exhibited together as Centre Five, and successfully promoted the use of sculpture by architects. In 1967, the group split from the Society, which never recovered from the departure of so many of its prominent members.

In 1977, he was invested with the Order of Australia for his services to sculpture and the arts. He was awarded Honorary Doctorate in Arts (RMIT University) in 1992. A major monograph on his work was published in 1999. The Lenton Parr Library (Lenton Parr Music, Visual and Performing Arts Library—formerly Victorian College of the Arts Library) of the University of Melbourne was named for him.

== Selected exhibitions ==
- 1956 Obelisk Gallery, London
- 1957 Peter Bray Gallery, Melbourne
- 1958 Victorian Sculptors Society
- 1958 Gallery A, Melbourne
- 1961 Mildura Art Gallery
- 1961 Musee Rodin, Paris, 2nd Int'l Expo of Contemporary Sculpture
- 1962 Hungry Horse Gallery, Sydney
- 1963 Sculpture Today, National Gallery of Victoria and Regional Galleries
- 1963 Centre 5, Newcastle City Art Gallery, NSW
- 1964-65 Recent Australian Sculpture, Touring Australian State Galleries
- 1964 Centre 5, Hungry Horse Gallery, Sydney
- 1966 Australian Sculpture Centre, Canberra
- 1968 Bonython Art Gallery, Sydney
- 1969 Bonython Art Gallery, Sydney
- 1973 Centre 5, Geelong Art Gallery, Victoria
- 1973 Centre 5, McCelland Art Gallery, Victoria
- 1977 Ray Hughes Gallery, Brisbane
- 1978 Powell Street Gallery, Melbourne
- 1981 Axiom Gallery, Melbourne
- 1984-85 Lenton Parr Sculpture: Retrospective, National Gallery of Victoria
- 1987 Christine Abrahams Gallery, Melbourne
- 1988-89 Manly Bicentennial Sculpture Commission
- 1990 Melbourne International Festival, Melbourne
- 1990 Christine Abrahams Gallery, Melbourne
- 1990 Melbourne Sculptural Triennial, Melbourne
- 1990 A-Z Gallery, Tokyo
- 1992 Irving Galleries, Sydney
- 1993 Christine Abrahams Gallery, Melbourne
- 1995 Australia Felix, Benalla, Victoria
- 1996 A Sculpture Walk in the Royal Botanic Gardens, Melbourne
- 1997 Christine Abrahams Gallery, Melbourne
- 1998 The Mentors: Work by the 6 Deans of the Victorian College of the Arts School of Art, Victorian Arts Centre, Melbourne

== Represented in collections ==
Represented in most State Gallery and other Public Collections and in various Institutional and Private Collections including:

- Art Gallery of New South Wales
- Art Gallery of Western Australia
- Australian National Gallery
- Australian National University
- Ballarat College of Advanced Education
- Carrick Hill, South Australia
- Deakin University'
- Geelong Art Gallery
- La Trobe University
- McClelland Gallery, Langwarrin
- Melbourne College of Advanced Education
- Mildura Arts Centre
- National Gallery of Victoria
- Newcastle Region Art Gallery
- Phillip Institute of Technology
- Queensland Art Gallery
- Queensland University of Technology
- University of Melbourne
- Victoria College
- Victorian College of the Arts
- Warrnambool Art Gallery

== Selected commissions ==
- 1954 Melbourne Grammar School
- 1958 Union Theatre, University of Melbourne
- 1959 Chadstone Shopping Centre, Victoria
- 1960 Offices of Bernard Evans & Associates, Melbourne
- 1961 Telstro House, Queen Street, Melbourne
- 1961 Chemistry Building, ANU, Canberra
- 1962 Geology Building, ANU, Canberra
- 1962 State Savings Bank, Showgrounds Branch, Melbourne
- 1963 'Age' offices, Collins Street, Melbourne
- 1964 Burwood Teachers' College, Burwood, Victoria
- 1964 John Curtin Memorial Building, ANU, Canberra
- 1965 General Motors - Holden, Fishermen's Bend, Melbourne
- 1966 New Customs House, William Street, Melbourne
- 1968 Philip Morris P/L, Moorabbin, Victoria
- 1969 IAC Building, Exhibition Street, Melbourne
- 1970 Technical Teachers' College, Malvern, Victoria
- 1970 Astrojet Building, Tullamarine, Victoria
- 1972 Private Commission, Hobart
- 1972 State College of Victoria, Coburg
- 1978 Australian Wool Corporation
- 1981 Victorian College of Pharmacy
- 1988 Elgee Park, Merricks, Victoria
- 1988-89 Bicentennial Sculpture, The Corso, Manly, NSW
- 2001 Besen Collection, Tarrawarra Estate, Victoria

== Bibliography ==
- Sculpture, Longmans 1961
- Vital Presences, Beagle Press 1999
