= City Square, Melbourne =

Public square in Melbourne, Australia

City Square
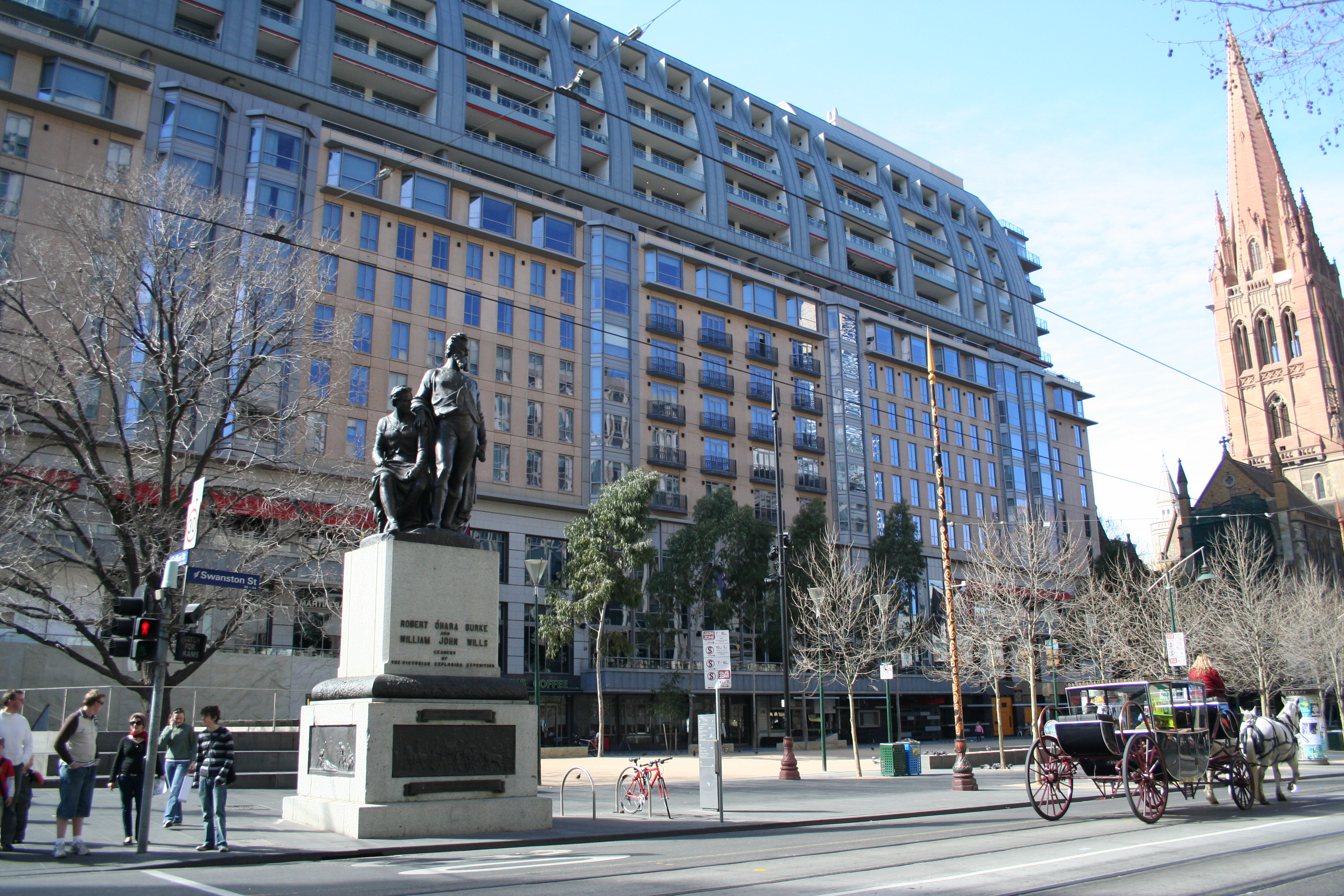
- City Square looking from Swanston Street before its 2017 demolition and subsequent redevelopment
- Interactive map of City Square
- Type: Public space
- Location: Melbourne, Victoria, Australia
- Coordinates: 37°48′57″S 144°58′1.3″E
- Opened: 28 May 1980
- Designer: Denton Corker Marshall
- Open: All year
- Public transit: Town Hall; City Square/Swanston Street (#11): 1, 3, 5, 6, 16, 64, 67, 72

The City Square is a public plaza located in the Central Business District (CBD) of Melbourne, Victoria, Australia. The site is bounded by Swanston Street, Collins Street, Flinders Lane and the Westin Hotel. The historic landmarks of Melbourne Town Hall and St Paul’s Cathedral are located across the streets to the north and south respectively.

The square has been redeveloped several times and has been associated with some controversies over the years. It closed on 3 April 2017 in preparation for the construction of Town Hall station as part of the Metro Tunnel project and was demolished later that year. The square was restored following the completion of the Metro Tunnel, reopening on 30 November 2025.

== History ==
The Melbourne CBD was originally laid out by Robert Hoddle in 1837 as a rectangular grid of 8 x 4 city blocks, with open space reserved around the edges. Like most of early Australian town layouts, it lacked any kind of civic or open space within the grid, but had reserved blocks or allotments for markets, public buildings, and churches. This lack of any public space or sweeping boulevards was criticised as early as 1850, and proposals for public squares within the grid cropped up regularly from the 1850s to the 1950s.

=== Council takes action ===
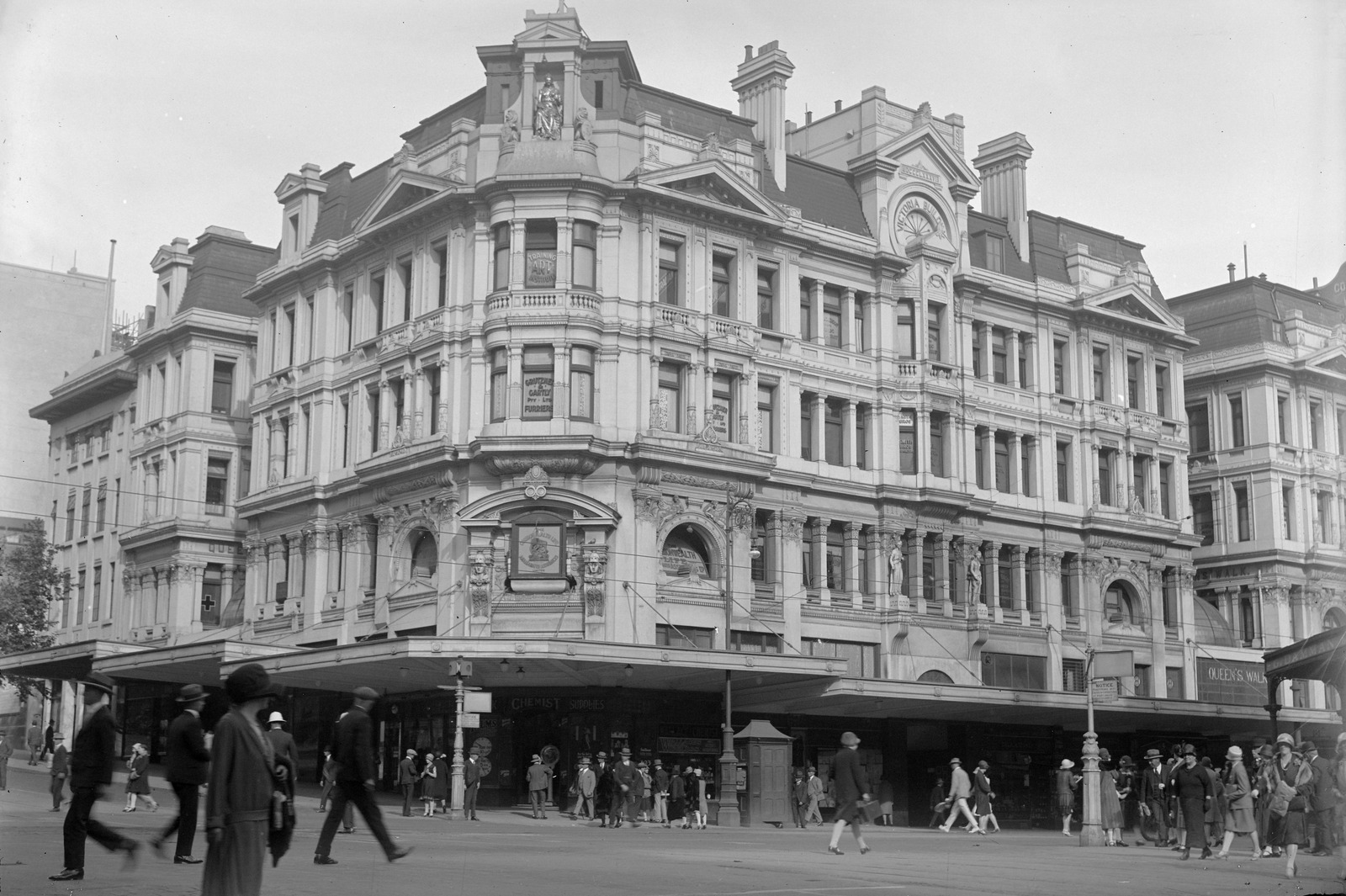
Queen Victoria Building c. 1924 including Queens Walk Arcade, the first of a significant group of buildings demolished on the site of the 1968 temporary square.

When Sir Bernard Evans, architect, and city councillor, was Lord Mayor of Melbourne in 1961, he was of the view that a city square should be created between the town hall and the cathedral instead of a civic plaza with a new town hall on top of the rail yards opposite Flinders Street Station; or a space to the north or east of the town hall; but he could not convince his fellow councillors. In 1966, when the Queen Victoria Building (on the corner of Swanston and Collins streets) and the adjacent City Club Hotel (opposite the town hall) had been demolished by a developer pending future development, the Council finally decided that it was a good site for the City Square, and purchased the land.

They began the process of acquiring properties along Swanston Street between the town hall and the cathedral, and east up to and including the Regent Theatre. Buildings purchased included the Cathedral Hotel, Cathedral House, Guy's Buildings (demolished 1969), Green's Building, the Town Hall Chambers (demolished 1971), Wentworth House, and Regency House on Flinders Lane. After the Regent Theatre closed in 1970, the Council bought it too, intending to demolish it for a larger square and a hotel tower to help fund the whole project, but the move was stopped by a union ban imposed in 1974.

By 1968, a temporary square of grass and paving was installed on the site of the Victoria Building and City Club Hotel. It was extended by the early 1970s up to Flinders Lane, then east up to Regent Place. In February 1976, a performance by the band, AC/DC was filmed there for a video clip for the single "It's a Long Way to the Top (If You Wanna Rock 'n' Roll)". The video was filmed on the same day as the well-known version filmed on the back of a flatbed truck travelling down Swanston Street.

=== Permanent square ===
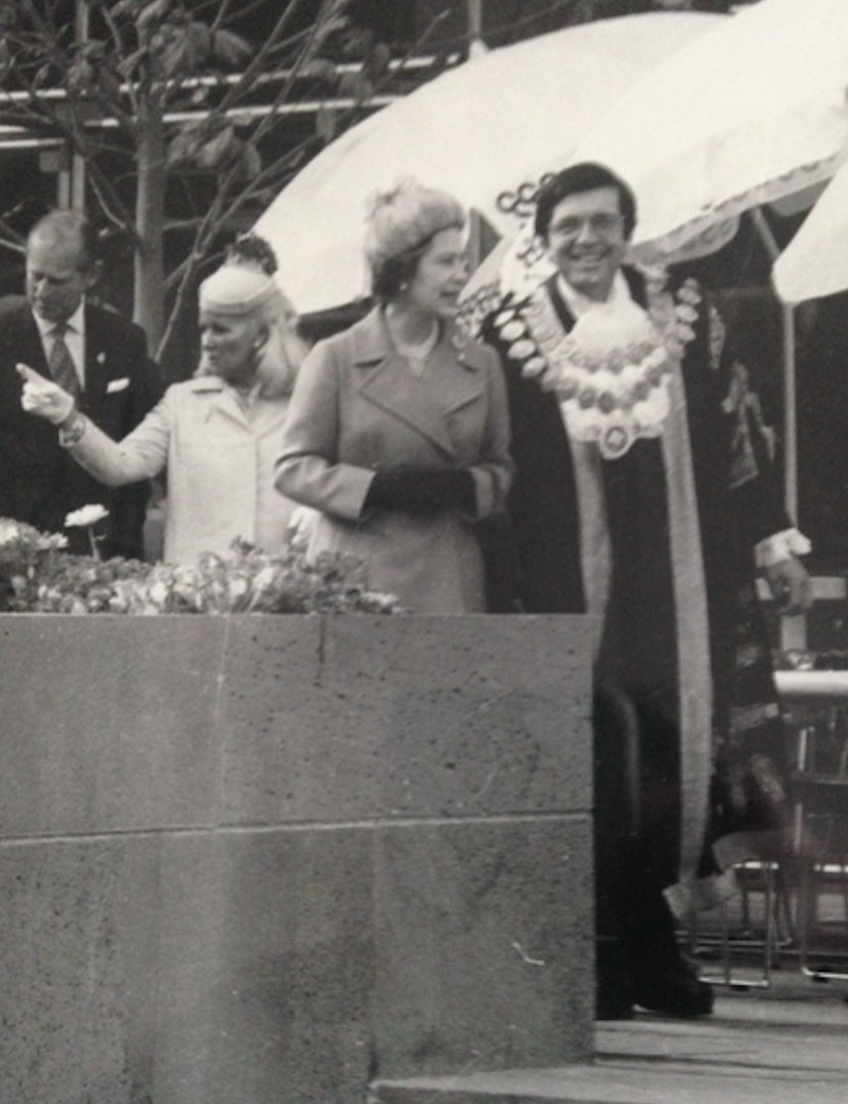
Queen Elizabeth opening City Square on 28 May, 1980

In 1976, an architectural competition was launched by Melbourne City Council to design a permanent square, which was won by Denton Corker Marshall architects. The design, responding to the complex brief, included a giant video screen, restaurants, shops and outdoor cafes; connected by a glazed canopy, a sunken amphitheatre, graffiti wall, reflecting pool, a water wall, and cascades as well as an open area of the main square. Most of the elements and the large flat area were clad with sawn bluestone. The Burke and Wills statue (1864) by Charles Summers, which had originally been at the intersection of Collins and Russell streets, was positioned on top of the cascades.

Following its opening by Queen Elizabeth II on 28 May 1980, the new square attracted criticism from the general public. The Age newspaper reported, "in interviews with newspaper reporters and on talk-back radio, many Melburnians have blasted their long awaited City Square for what they see as its bareness, the noise from its controversial video matrix screen and the starkness of the glazed steel canopy running along the Regent Theatre Wall". A large yellow steel sculpture titled Vault by Ron Robertson-Swann, which was commissioned as a centrepiece for the square, was immediately controversial, and Council soon voted to remove it, relocating it to Batman Park in July 1981.

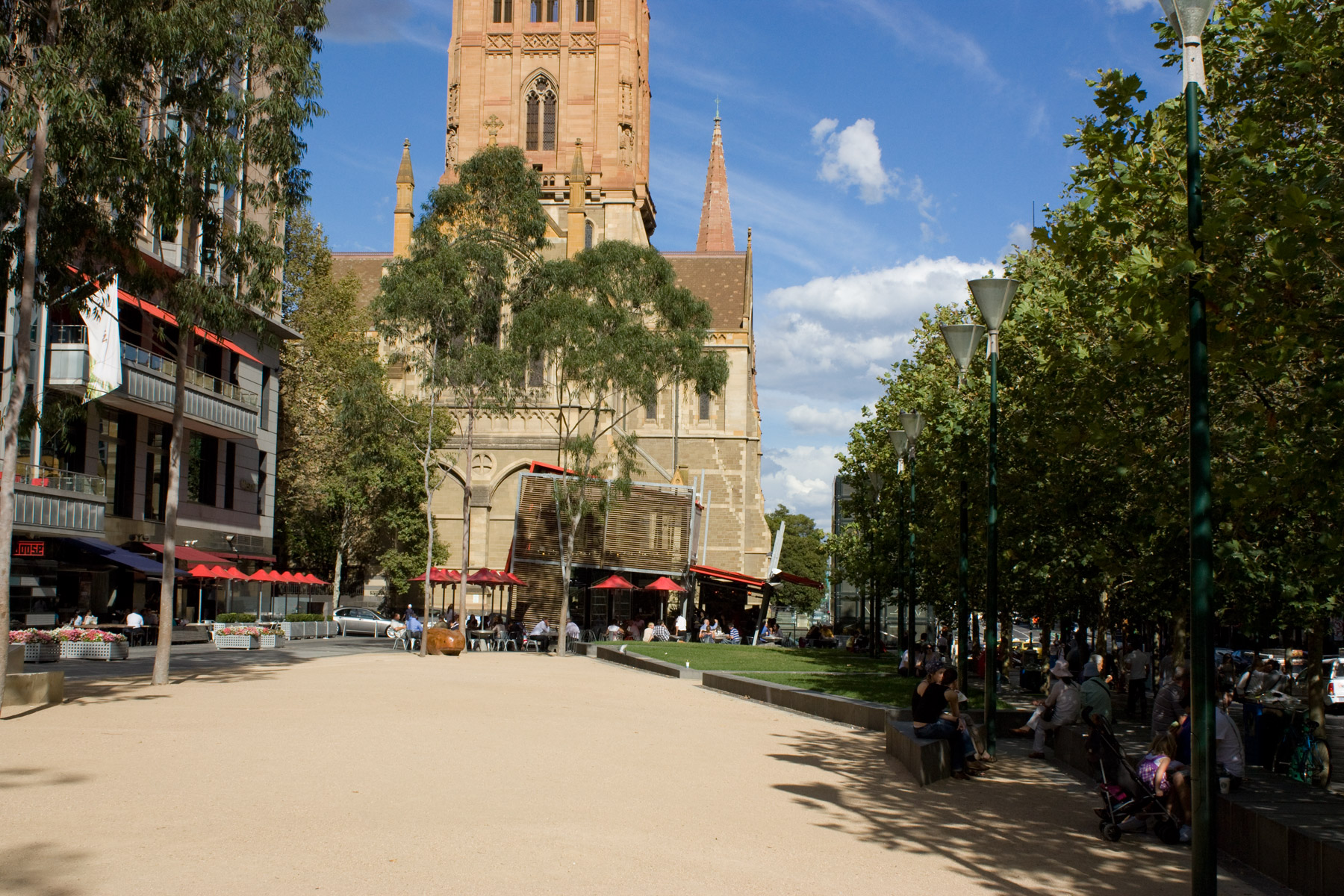
City Square prior to its 2017 demolition

On 14 January 1981, a 12-year-old boy swimming in the water fountain pool was sucked inside the fountain's filter system and was presumed drowned. Despite being trapped for more than 40 minutes, firemen managed to rescue the boy against the odds.

In the following decades, the square was increasingly seen as a failure.

=== Second square ===
In the mid-1990s, the eastern half of the square was sold to developer David Marriner for the development of the Westin Hotel, in a complex deal that saw the restoration of the Regent Theatre, which was to be managed by Marriner's company, Staged Developments. The restored theatre reopened in 1996. Between 1997 and 2000, the remaining area of the square was redeveloped with a much simpler plan, with bars and cafes under the hotel, some seating and the large oak tree transplanted to the Collins Street corner, and a large flat area of granitic gravel intended for events, plus a 450-space car park underneath. A linear water feature on the eastern side by a glass artist, Denise Sullivan, and a water wall, known as the John Mockridge Fountain on Collins Street, were installed. Plane trees lined the Swanston Street edge.

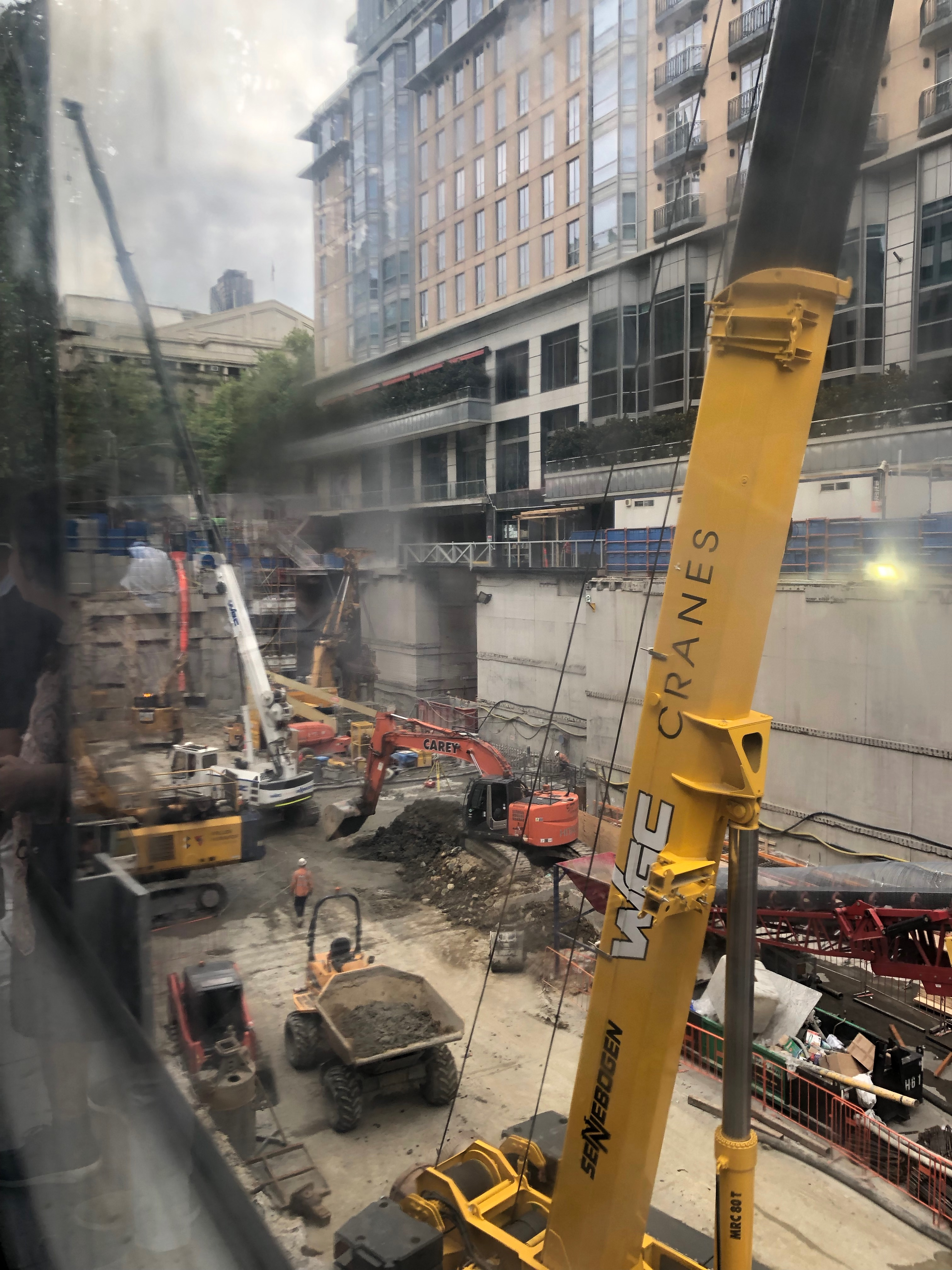
Excavation at City Square for Town Hall station, 2019

A cast bronze statue of a small dog created by Melbourne artist Pamela Irving and titled Larry La Trobe was located in the northwest corner in 1992. The statue became widely known after its theft in 1995. A revamped version of the statue was recast and reinstalled in 1996 following a long public campaign. In 2003, raised areas with grass were added to soften the place and provide informal seating areas. With the substantial reduction of its area and the opening of the nearby Federation Square soon after in 2002, the civic importance of the City Square diminished.

In October 2011, Lord Mayor Robert Doyle ordered an eviction of about 100 Occupy Melbourne protesters from the City Square, which was enforced by up to 400 riot police.

== Current status ==
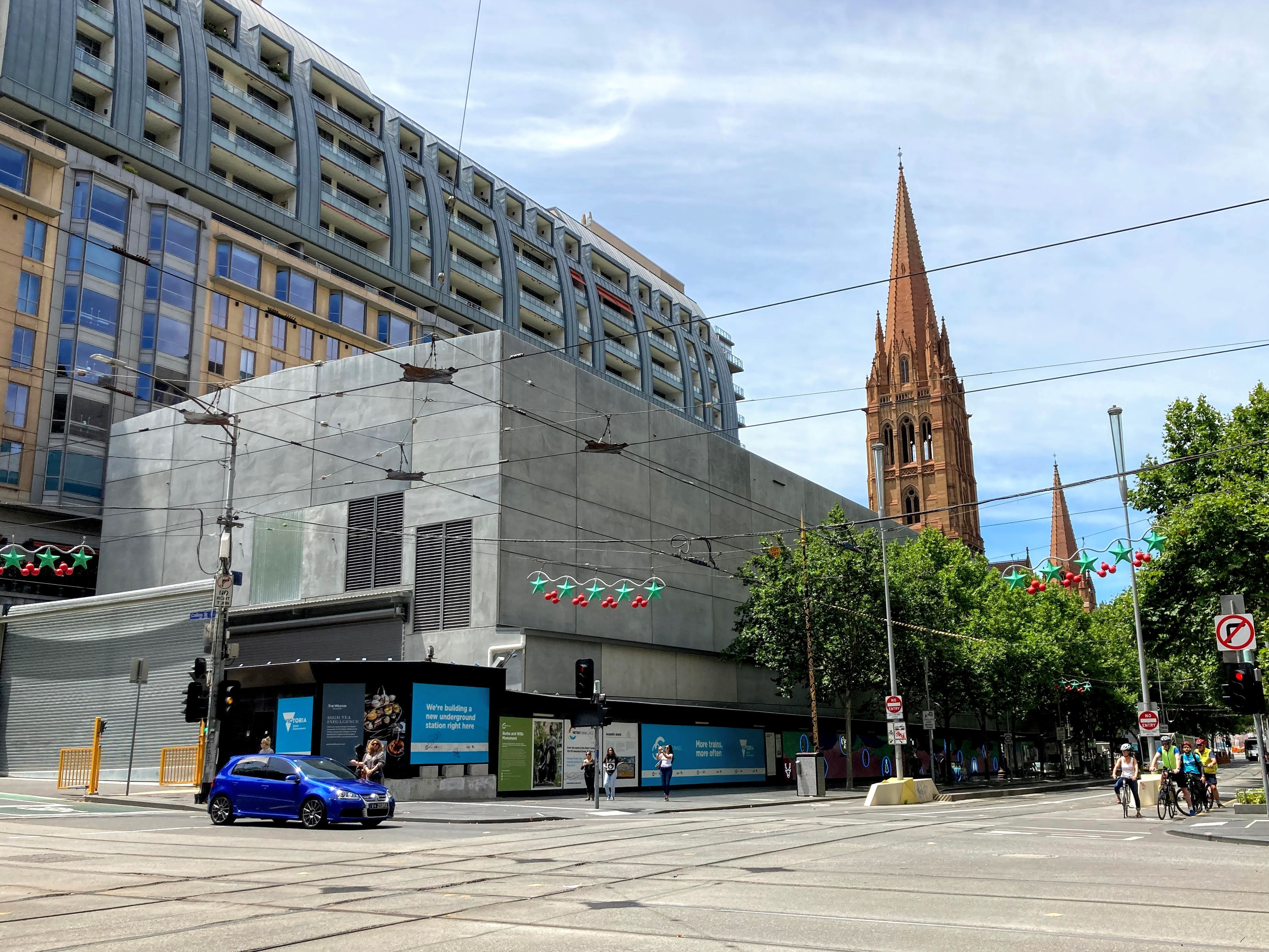
Acoustic shed built at City Square to allow for the construction of Town Hall station as part of the Metro Tunnel project, 2020

In early 2016, as part of the construction of the Metro Tunnel, it was announced that the City Square would be acquired and demolished to allow for the construction of CBD South Station, to be known as Town Hall Station. City Square businesses were evicted and the square itself was closed on 3 April 2017. The demolition of the square and the part of the car park structure under it began in late 2017. A large acoustic shed was erected on the site in 2019 to contain construction noise and dust. The acoustic shed remained in place until it was taken down over six months in 2022 by two 50-metre cranes. A mural by local artist Emma Coulter titled, Spatial deconstruction #23 (resilience) was painted onto the shed in 2021.

As part of the construction of the Town Hall station, the City Square precinct is set to be rebuilt as a public gathering and events space. Draft designs for its reconstruction show the square rebuilt much as it was, but with an entrance to the new station occupying the north end. The City Square entrance will be the main entrance to the Town Hall Station and will feature a glass canopy designed by the Metro Tunnel architects RSHP, Hassell, and Weston Williamson.

The famous statue of ill-fated explorers Burke and Wills was removed from City Square in 2017 and was planned to return to the corner of Collins and Swanston Streets after the completion of the station, but was instead relocated to the Royal Society of Victoria on La Trobe Street. The John Mockridge Fountain water wall was also planned to be returned to the northern edge of the City Square along Collins Street, but was instead demolished, replaced by a digital version in the same location.
