= The Oxford Scholar Hotel =

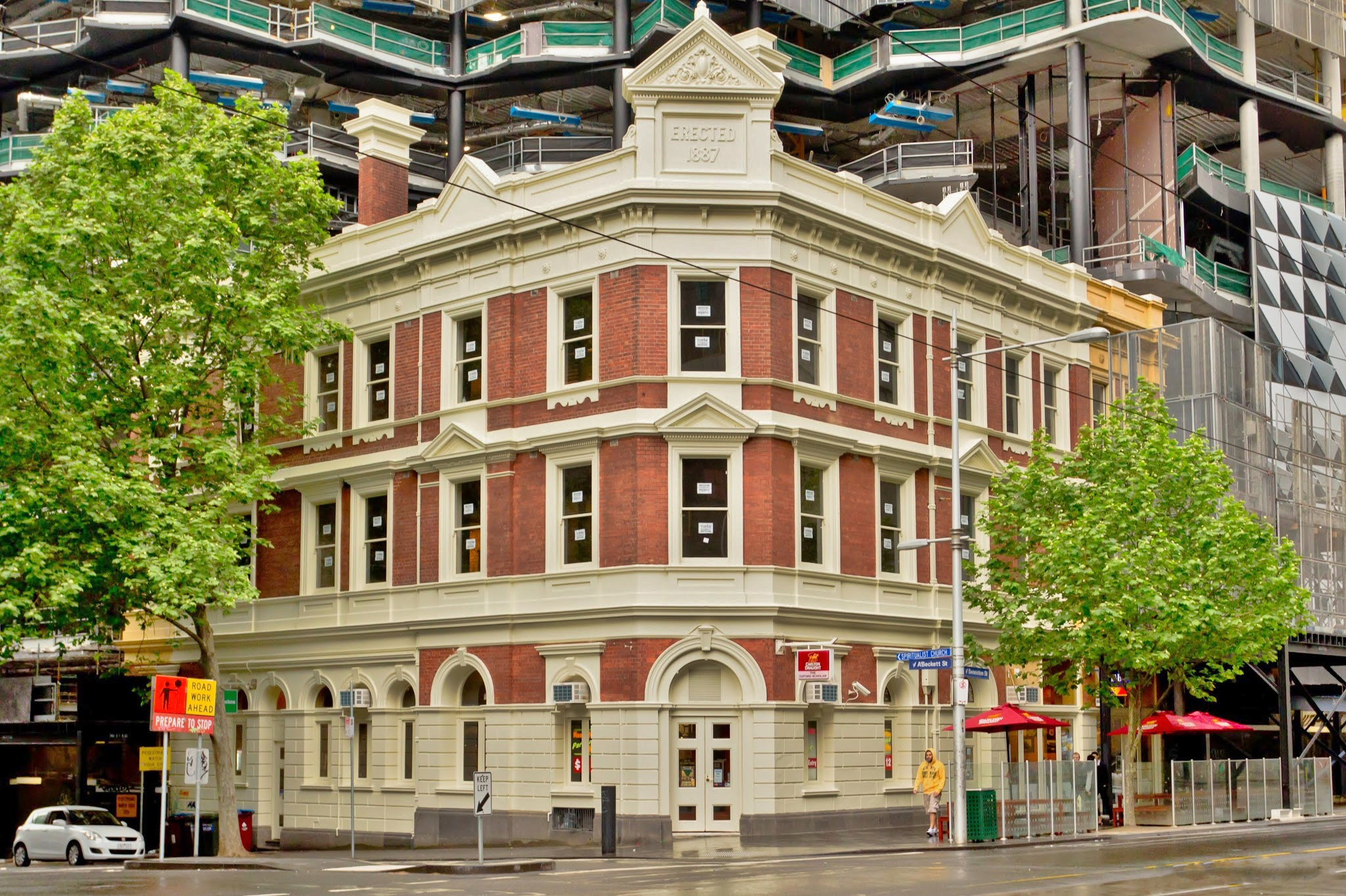
- Interactive map of the The Oxford Scholar Hotel area

General information
- Location: 427 Swanston St, Cbd, Melbourne
- Coordinates: 37°48′23″S 144°57′47″E
- Opened: 1857

The Oxford Scholar Hotel is a pub in Melbourne, Victoria, which was founded in 1857 during Victoria's gold rush.

It is connected to the buildings of RMIT on Swanston Street, Melbourne, and is associated with the students of that university.

== History ==
The business originated in 1857 during Victoria's gold rush. It has operated for approximately 160 years.

It was affected by the construction of Melbourne's Metro Tunnel project. Prior to its temporary closure in 2017, it operated as a simple university pub. Its interior at this time was described as having 'country-pub-style carpets' and it had a limited food offering.

The pub was then redesigned in 2019 by the architecture firm March Studio. Since its renovation its interior is brass and timber, with booth seating and high tables. The back of the venue has an amphitheater area with raised floors and glass ceilings. Its redesign focused on 'tweed' as a theme. Its redevelopment involved a legal dispute with payment claims made by construction workers against the firm Schiavello Construction.
