= Larry La Trobe =

Coordinates: 37°48′55.93″S 144°58′0.74″E

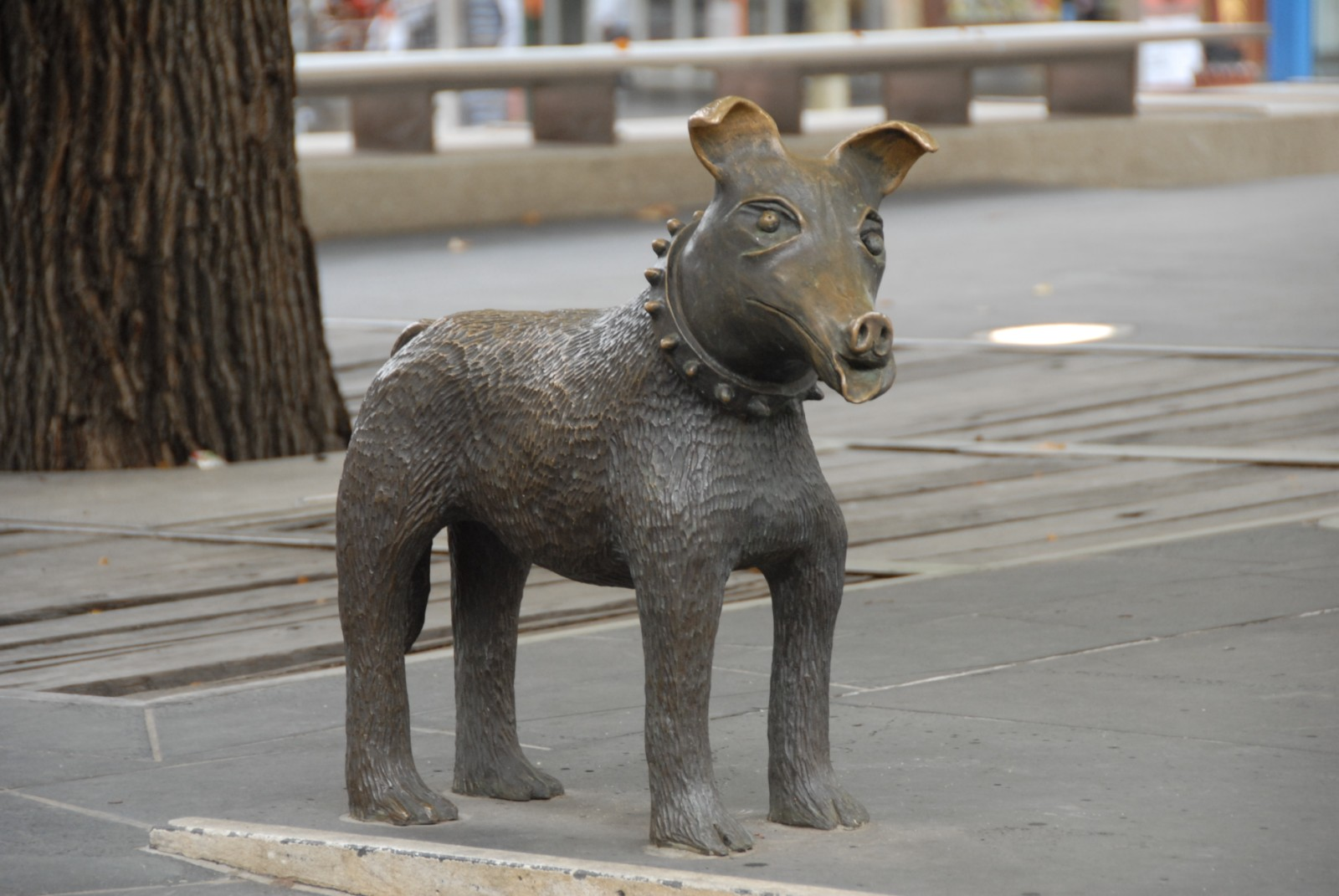
- Artist: Pamela Irving
- Year: 1992, 1996
- Type: Bronze
- Dimensions: 70 cm (28 in)
- Location: Melbourne, Australia

Larry La Trobe is the name given to a popular, cast bronze statue of a dog situated on the northern end of Melbourne's City Square (corner of Collins Street and Swanston Street). Along with the Burke & Wills monument, the statue is one of only two free standing art works in the City Square precinct. The statue now located in the square is the second statue of 'Larry', the original having been stolen.

== History ==
Melbourne artist Pamela Irving created the statue as a result of a commission from the Melbourne City Council in 1992 and it was the first sculpture for Melbourne's Open Air Sculpture Museum. Based on her own dog, Lucy, the statue is not representative of any particular breed but was crafted to generate a sense of Australian larrikinism in the viewer. Irving named the statue after her uncle Larry and the surname 'La Trobe' was appended to represent the relationship with Melbourne and the state of Victoria. Charles La Trobe was the first Lieutenant-Governor of the state of Victoria.

Despite being anchored by 30 cm bolts, the statue was stolen on the night of 30/31 August 1995. It was thought to have been taken as part of a university stunt or melted down.

A campaign was started by the Melbourne Times, a weekly city newspaper, to recover Larry. The publicity generated by this campaign captured the imagination of the public. A two-metre high likeness of Larry was created for the 1996 Moomba Parade to create additional publicity that might lead to the return of the statue.

Although the subject of a significant publicity and media campaign, the original statue has never been recovered and nobody has been apprehended for the theft. In 1996, Peter Kolliner, previous owner of the foundry where Larry was originally cast, paid for a casting of a new statue. The new statue was cast in the same mould as the original but Irving reddened the casting material to provide the second 'Larry' with a unique identity.

The second Larry was reinstalled in the City Square and officially unveiled on 16 September 1996 by Melbourne Lord Mayor, Councillor Ivan Deveson.

The two-metre high replica of the statue used in the Moomba Parade was taken to Osaka, Japan, a sister city of Melbourne, in 1997 for the Midosuji Parade, where it was awarded the prize for Best Float.

== Description ==
The statue is approximately 70 cm high and cast from bronze. Although it has been likened to a 'dingo type dog', the model for the statue is a composite that does not represent any one breed in particular.

== Cultural events ==
The image of Larry was one of the features of the 1999 Melbourne Comedy Festival. Ceramic sculptures of Larry in comedic parodies of famous international and Australian artists' works were displayed in the windows of Myer on Melbourne's Bourke Street Mall. A sculpture of 'Larry' riding Phar Lap and titled 'Phar Larry' was also created by Irving for the 1999 Melbourne Cup.

== Popularity ==
The location, accessibility and popularity of the statue have resulted in it becoming one of Melbourne's most photographed statues.

== Gallery ==
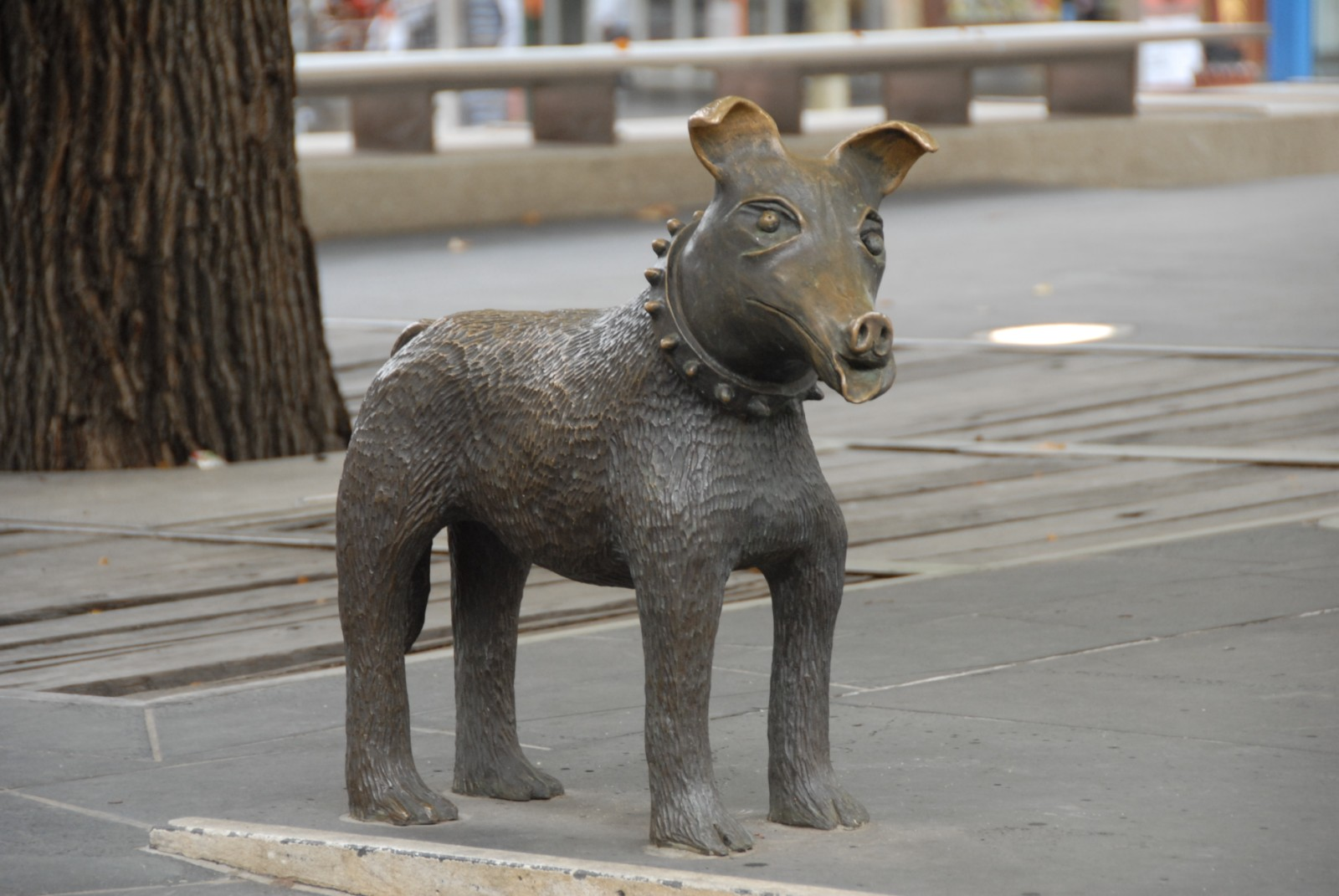
The second bronze statue of Larry La Trobe, Melbourne City Square.

Larry La Trobe statue with the statue of Burke & Wills in the background.

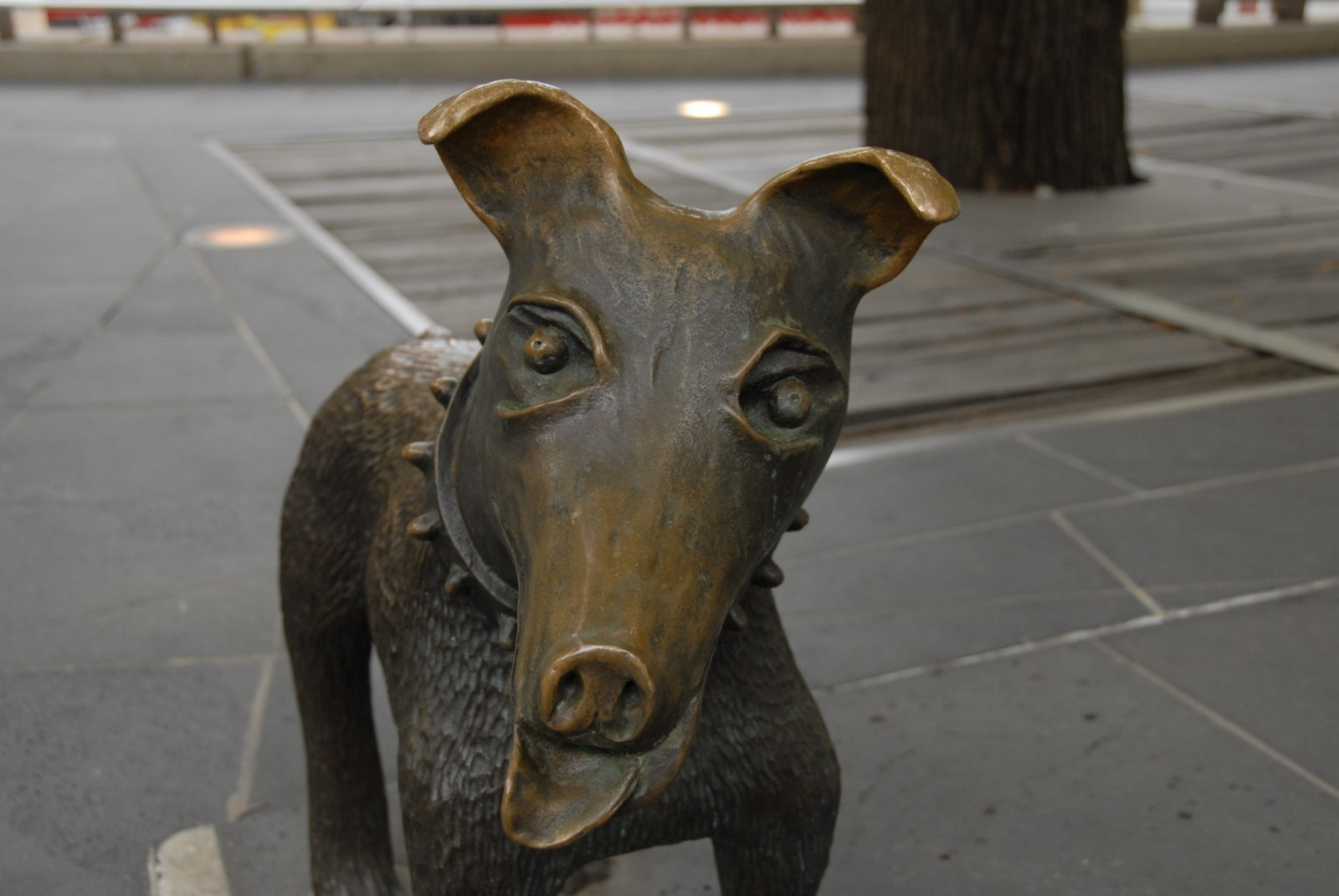
The second bronze statue of Larry La Trobe created by Melbourne artist Pamela Irving, Melbourne City Square.
