= Pamela Irving =

Australian sculptor (born 1960)

- Born: Pamela Anne Irving; 1960 (age 65–66); Melbourne, Australia
- Education: Melbourne State College, Melbourne College of Advanced Education
- Known for: Ceramics, Sculpture, Mosaics, Printmaking, Etching
- Notable work: Larry La Trobe (1992, 1996)
- Awards: Nominated Kamel Kiln Award (1981); Ceramic Prize City of Box Hill (1985); Ceramic Prize City of Footscray (1985); Pat Corrigan Artists grant (1991); Australia Day Ceramic Award Shaepparton Art Gallery (1994)
- Website: pamelairving.com.au

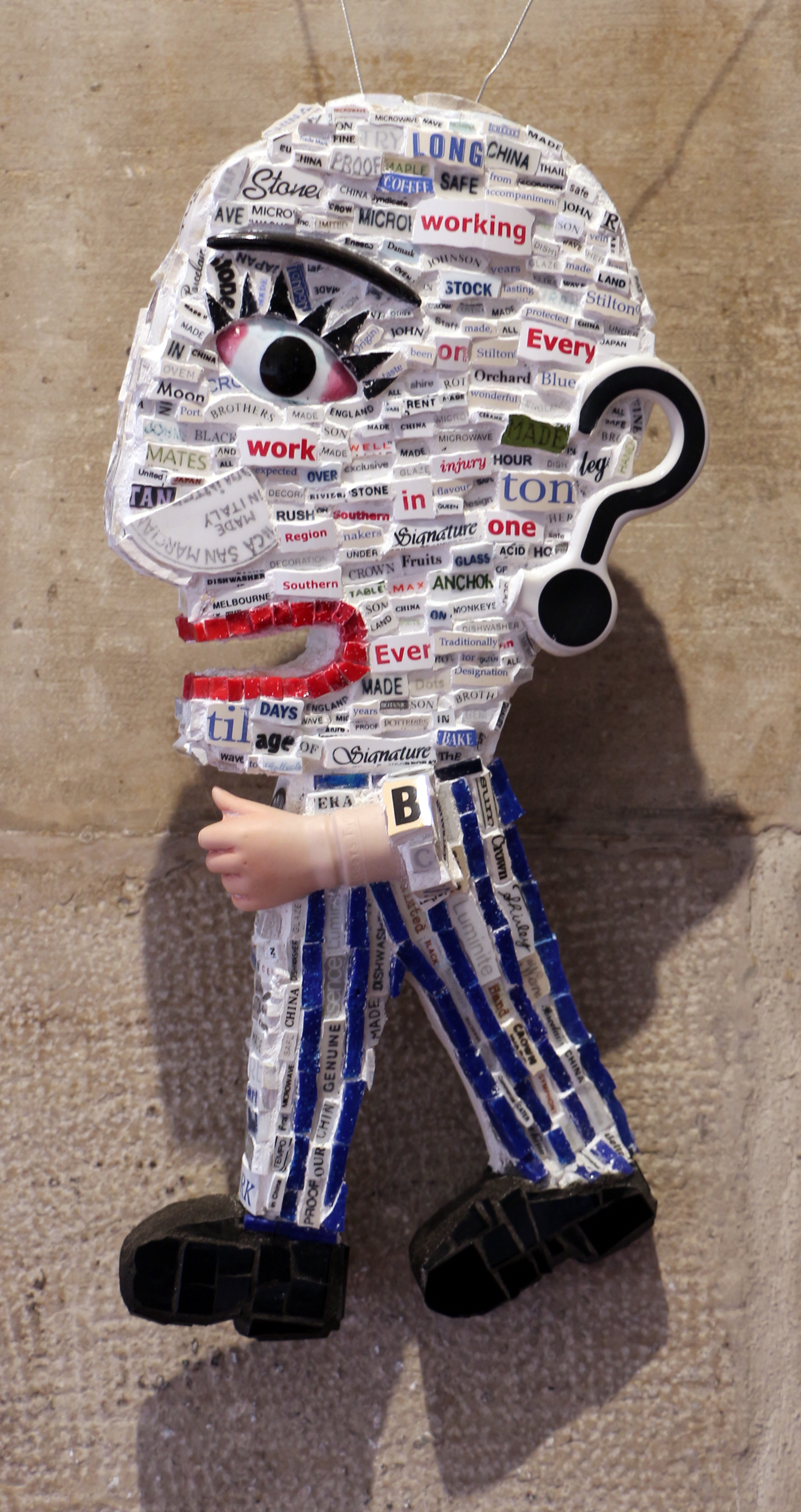
Mr. Logomania, The man who loves words, 2013, Collezione Mosaici Moderni, Ravenna

Pamela Irving (born 1960) is an Australian visual artist with a diverse practice in bronze, ceramic and mosaic sculptures as well as printmaking and copper etchings. In addition to her extensive art work, Irving has lectured in art and ceramics at Monash University, the Melbourne College of Advanced Education, the Royal Melbourne Institute of Technology (RMIT) and the Chisholm Institute of Technology. One of Australia's newspaper art critics, she wrote for the Geelong Advertiser and was a councillor on the Craft Council of Victoria.

== Education ==
Born in Melbourne, Australia, Irving was formally educated at the Melbourne State College (1979–1982) where she undertook a Bachelor of Education (Art/Craft). She exhibited in a student show The Sentiment is Genuine, in 1981 the College's Gryphon Gallery.

Irving's Master of Arts by Research The Angel Imagery of Arthur Boyd, John Perceval and Mirka Mora undertaken at the Melbourne College of Advanced Education (1984-1989) was supervised by ceramicist and Head of Ceramics Department Professor Noel John Flood. Irving was one of the first two candidates to be approved to undertake the Master of Arts Degree in Visual Arts in the Melbourne CAE. Her thesis examined:

...reasons and meaning behind the presence and mythology imagery in the works of Arthur Boyd, John Perceval and Mirka Mora (those artists being nominated because of the relevance to my own work).

During her Masters candidature Irving participated in 24 group shows and presented 3 solo exhibitions, nationally and abroad.

== Style and influences ==
Irving's early art was influenced by artists including Arthur Boyd, John Brack, Noel Connihan, Mirka Mora, Sidney Nolan and John Perceval. In recent years, Irving has been influenced ″by the honest and direct expressiveness of ‘outsider art’ (the art of self-taught or 'naive artists') and the craft of 'memoryware'″ Significantly, this interest grew following Irving's visit to Nek Chand's Rock Garden in Chandigarh, India.

== Critical reception ==
Pascoe observes that Irving's work is derived from "a mixture of personal experience, myth and virulent imagination." A reviewer notes of her 1991 Blaxland Gallery joint exhibition with painter Adrienne Lourie, how: "myths and conventional notions of marriage are critically but humorously challenged through the ... the ceramics of Pamela Irving...under the theme, The Bride Stripped Bare. Hammond has described Irving's early ceramic work as 'humorous, figurative and cheerfully contemptuous of pottery traditions.

Leigh Astbury, whose 1998 essay 'The Dog in Australian Art' in Art + Australia, writes that "Regardless of the scepticism of the art cognoscenti, statues of dogs continue to serve as important symbols for local communities, especially where they can suggest links with a pioneering past. [...one...] is the mythological little mutt, Larry La Trobe, 1992 (and 1996), which Pamela Irving created in bronze for Melbourne’s City Square. But the popular Larry La Trobe also derives from the folklore tradition, as Irving explains: ‘It relates to all the stories about Australia, the poetry, the books and so on ... The Drover’s Dog and The Dog on the Tucker Box. My work is a bit off-beat, whimsical, funky kind of stuff anyway."

== Notable work ==
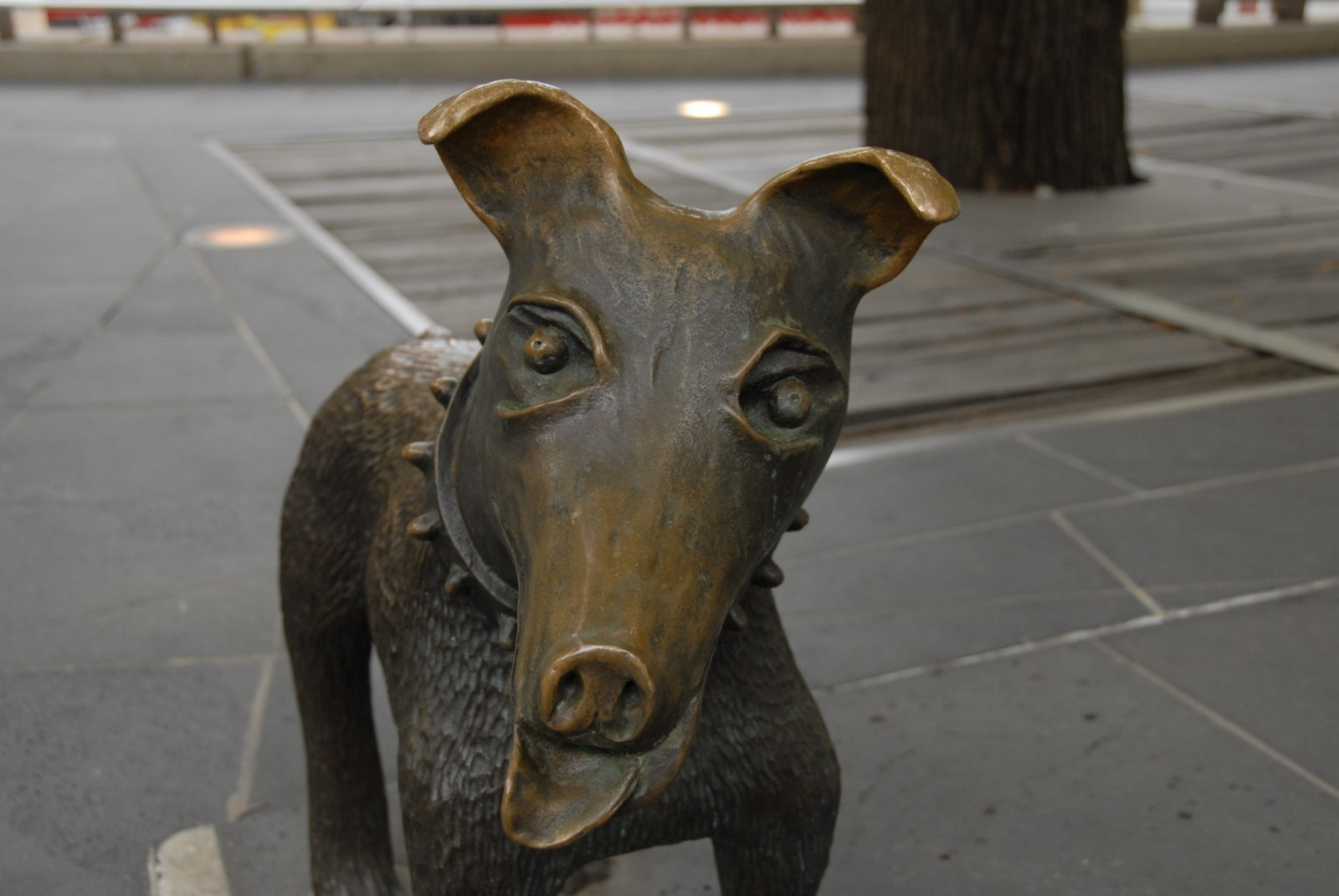
The second bronze statue of Larry La Trobe, Melbourne City Square, created by Pamela Irving

Irving's most famous work is the bronze sculpture of Larry La Trobe, commissioned in 1992 as a part of the Swanston Street redevelopment in Melbourne, and stolen by a thief or thieves unknown during 1995. The resulting media attention rallied significant public support for the recovery of the sculpture. Although never retrieved, the statue was recast by the foundry owner, Peter Kolliner, with some minor changes by Irving and was replaced in September 1996. The Larry sculpture is located at the corner of Swanston Street and Collins Street, Melbourne. 'Happy as Larry' was the brand applied to homewares and objets d'art by Irving and Toula Ikonomou which was launched in November 1998 at Bulle Galleries, 96 Flinders Street, Melbourne

Another notable commission is a large mosaic mural covering the Luna Palace building inside Melbourne's Luna Park. This large scale public artwork was commissioned for the centenary of Luna Park and took four years to complete.

== Professional associations ==
Active in mosaic art in Australia, Irving served as a councillor on the Craft Council of Victoria during the 1980s and became vice-president of the Mosaic Association of Australia and New Zealand between 2007 - 2017.

== Exhibitions ==
Between 1981 and 2018, Irving took part in 27 solo exhibitions, 16 joint exhibitions and more than 100 group exhibitions.

=== Solo ===
- 2024 Waste Not want Not Crew, Maroondah Federation Estate Gallery
- 2019: YOLO Man Waltzes Matilda, Port Fairy Folk Festival, Blarney Books + Art + Pamela Irving Studio + Gallery
- 2018: Yolo Man and His Apocalyptic Alphabet, Deakin University Art Gallery
- 2017: Irreverent Tales City of Whitehorse, Artspace Gallery
- 2017 Dream Out Loud @ Without Pier Gallery
- 2015 Ballarat Bestiary CONTAINART exhibition, City of Ballarat.
- 2015 Yolo Man and His Apocalyptic Alphabet: The Chicago Suite, Gallery of Contemporary Mosaics, Chicago.
- 2015 Doggeral Dreams Gallery on Sturt, Ballarat
- 2014 Doggeral Dreams Montsalvat Gallery, Melbourne.
- 2011 Dreaming with Open Eyes, Light Factory Gallery
- 2004-2006 Treading the Boards Shepparton Art Museum, Geelong Art Gallery, Ballarat Art Gallery
- 2000, 18 August–September: Adelaide Central Gallery, Norwood, South Australia
- 1997 A Decade of Images Lyall Burton Gallery
- 1998, from 9 November: Bulle Galleries, 96 Flinders Street, Melbourne
- 1995 Tabloid Royals, Holdsworth Gallery, Sydney,
  - Tabloid Royals Bendigo Art Gallery,
  - Tabloid Royals Shepparton Art Museum
- 1993, 21 November–6 December: Ned Kelly’s Last Supper, Artefact, South Yarra
- 1993 Sincerely YoursHoldsworth Gallery, Sydney
- 1991, from 2 June: Love, Myth & Suffering Caulfield Arts Complex
- 1991 Canine Companions No Vacancy 189 Collins St Melbourne
- 1990 Perfect PetsHoldsworth Gallery, Sydney
- 1988 A Divine Comedy Holdsworth Gallery, Sydney
  - A Divine Comedy Despard Street Gallery,Hobart
- 1987 Images of Angels Gryphon Gallery, Melbourne
- 1986 Ceramic Sculpture Holdsworth Gallery, Sydney
- 1983 Ceramic Sculpture Profile Gallery, Melbourne
- Joint Exhibitions:
- 2024 Memoryware + New Narratives Riggs & Irving Exhibition as part of NGV’s Design Week.
- 2019: Savage Liaisons AMI + IRVING, Gallery of Contemporary Mosaics, Chicago + SOFA Chicago
- 2016 Savage Curiosities Karen Ami + Pamela Irving GoCM Chicago September-October
- 2003 REFLUXUS Motor Works Gallery, Melbourne Grammar.
- 2002 REFLUXUS – Bendigo Art Gallery, Maroondah Art Gallery
- 2001 Serious Humour Volvo Gallery Sydney Irving + Shimmen
- 2001 Sense & Serendipity Montsalvat. Irving, Shimmen & Hicks
- 2000 Memoryware Irving & Shimmen Adelaide Central Gallery
- 1998 Byte The Invisible Future Shimmen & Irving Despard Gallery, Tasmania
- 1991 The Bride Stripped Bare Irving & Lourie, Blaxand Gallery Melbourne
- 1988 Wiggs and Irving, Hong Kong Arts Centre, Hong Kong
- 1987 Body to Body Irving & Flood Devise Gallery Melbourne
- 1984 Sheer Madness Irving, Halpern & Shearer, Gryphon Gallery
- 1983, 8–30 October: Pamela Irving sculpture. The Field Workshop, South Melbourne 3205
- 1981 Two of a Kind John & Pamela Irving, Eltham Gallery, Melbourne

=== Group Exhibitions ===
- 2024 Equalessable Artbank Sydney Window
- 2023 Sets, Series and Ensembles Gallery of Contemporary Mosaic, Chicago
- 2023 All Creatures Gallery of Contemporary Mosaic Chicago
- 2023 Twenty Five Whitehorse ARTSPACE
- 2023 Stories from Council’s Art Collection Glen Eira City Council curated exhibition.
- 2022 Sage Advice for the Serious Young Artist Whitehorse Art Space
- 2022 Maetros Gallery of Contemporary Mosaics, Chicago, works by Irving, Kii, MacInnes, Marzi + Zanelli
- 2021 Flying Masks Maison de la Mosaïque Contemporaine, Paray-le- Monial, France
- 2021 Victorian Sculpture Awards Gippsland Regional Art Gallery
- 2021 MSWPS Members Exhibition (Virtual due to Covid)
- 2021 Breaking Ground Gallery of Contemporary Mosaics, Chicago
- 2021 Deakin University Small Sculpture Award 2021 Deakin University Gallery
- 2020: MSWPS (Melbourne Society of Women Painters + Sculptors) Members Exhibition. (Virtual Due to COVID)
- C-/O CARE @ Craft + Design Centre Canberra, ACT
- 2019: Contemporary Women Painters, invitational exhibition Hunan Province, China
- 2019 TRANSITIONS Hazelhurst Regional Gallery, NSW
- 2018 AIMC St Nicholas Church, Paray le Monial, France
- 2018 Text SOFA Chicago + Gallery of Contemporary Mosaics.
- 2018: The Marks They Make Gallery of Contemporary Mosaics, Chicago
- 2018: Debut Gallery of Contemporary Mosaics, Chicago, USA
- 2018: TRANSITIONS, joint show with Bremner, Butler, Hughes + Bodycomb Craft + Design Centre, Canberra
- 2017: Mosaic Exhibition At Mawsons Pavillion, Tasmania with Bremner, Bodycomb, Edwards + Irving
- 2017: SOFA Chicago with Gallery of Contemporary Mosaics, Chicago
- 2017 Art in Pieces, International Mosaic Exhibition, City Gallery, Lexington Kentucky, USA
- 2017 Collective Visions:130 Years Bendigo Art Gallery
- 2016 – 2017 The Stories We Tell, Gallery of Contemporary Mosaics, Chicago
- 2017 Coolart @ Coolart Gallery organised by Without Pier Gallery
- 2016 Kyoto Mosaic Exhibition, Shimadai Gallery Kyoto
- 2016 Works on Paper Without Pier Gallery, Melbourne.
- 2016 Mount View Art Show (Guest Artist)
- 2016 Highlights from the Ceramics Victoria Collection, Whitehorse Arts Space.
- 2016 OCGA Art Exhibition + Sale
- 2016 MOSAIC: AIMC in the Contemporary World Palazzo Tadea, Spilimbergo, Italy.
- 2016 A Passover Story Museum of Biblical Arts, Dallas Texas
- 2015 Works on Paper 2, WG Art Consultants.
- 2015 Bibliomosaico Biennale de Mosaique d’Obernai Municipality of Obernai, France
- 2015 + 2016 Mosaics Abroad Exhibition of 11 International Artists, Touring Japan for 12 months
  - Yokohama Civic Art Gallery Azamino, Yokohama in Kanagawa
  - Tajimi Art Gallery Gallery Voice Tajimi in Gifu
  - Gallery in Sekigahara Marble Craft, Sekigahara in Gifu
  - ORIE Art Gallery, Minat-ku in Tokyo
  - Grande Magazzino Isetan, Shinjuku in Tokyo
- 2015 Mount View Art Show, (Guest Artist)
- 2015 Our Kaleidoscope of Colour and Culture, Lauriston Art Exhibition 2015, Leonard Joels
- 2014 Bibliomosaico National Library of Latvia, Riga, Latvia
- 2014 Works on Paper 1, WG Art Consultants
- 2014 OCGA Art Exhibition + Sale
- 2013 Mosaic Exhibition, Bundoora Hoestead
- 2013 Bibliomosaico Edizioni del Girasole, Ravenna, Italy
- 2013 Mosaik Yarismasi, Gaziantep Museum, Gaziantep, Republic of Turkey
- 2013 Illuminate National Biennial Mosaic Exhibition, Bundoorah Homestead
- 2012 Lasallian Foundation Fine Art Charity Auction @ Menzies
- 2012 OCGA Art Exhibition
- 2009 The Artist and the Mosaic Exhibition opened 1st April in Moscow’s Schusev State Museum for Architecture, Moscow.Russia.
- 2006 Mosaic Art Now Bundoora Homestead, (Artists from Spilimbergo, Italy + Australia)
- 2006 OGCA Exhibition
- 2003 The Guitar Festival Show Cube 37
- 2003 The Synthetic Show Yarra Sculpture Gallery
- 2003 May Exhibition, Manyung Gallery
- 2002 Councillors Choice, Maroondah Art Gallery
- 2002Refluxus Bendigo Art Gallery
- 2002 Refluxus Maroondah Federation Estate
- 2002 Children’s Book Illustrations Custom’s House Gallery, Warnambool
- 2002 Clay At Montsalvat Montsalvat Gallery
- 2002 Friends For Craft, Steps Gallery
- 2002 A Baroque Christmas Despard Gallery, Hobart2001 In Door Out Door Mira Art Gallery
- 2001 Creative Madness Volvo Gallery Sydney.
- 2001 The Melbourne International Flower & Garden Show, Garry Mc Ewan Exhibit.
- 2001-2002 Art Horses: Phar Larry. Museum Victoria, Caulfield Race Course. Geelong Art Gallery, Melbourne Exhibition Buildings, Melbourne Flower Show
- 2000 The Art of Living Sotheby’s Melbourne
- 2000 The Exquisite Corpse Bendigo Art Gallery, Monash Art Gallery,Swan Hill Regional Gallery Ararat Regional Gallery.
- 2000 Art Animals Walker St Gallery, Dandenong, Switchback Gallery, Monash University. Ararat Regional Gallery
- 1999 Australian Book Illustration Show, Customs House Gallery
- 1999 Artsville- The Big Shed in the Bush Fryerstown, Victoria
- 1999 Contemporary Clay Biennial Exhibition Cowwar Art Space Gippsland
- 1999-2003 We Are Australian Victorian Arts Centre, Volvo Gallery Sydney, Adelaide Festival Centre, Canberra Museum &Art Gallery, New England Regional Art Museum, Tasmanian Museum & Art Gallery, Albury Wodonga Regional Art Gallery, State Library of Queensland, Latrobe Regional Art Gallery., Immigration Museum Melbourne.
- 1999 Craft Victorian Auction Deutscher Menzies Gallery
- 1999 ST Kilda Festival Art in Windows Show
- 1998 Sydney Myer Fund International Ceramics Award Shepparton
- Art Gallery
- 1998 The Fabulous Brooch Show, Meat Market Craft Centre.
- 1998 Picture This, Customs House Gallery, Warnambool
- 1998 The Cask An Aussie Icon, National Gallery of Victoria, Toowoomba Arts Centre
- 1998 Raining Cats and Dogs, Despard Gallery, Hobart
- 1997 Ici un bout du monde, here, one corner of the world The Alliance Francais, Canberra
- 1997 The Match Box Show Grand Central Art, Melbourne
- 1997 New and Gallery Artists Lyall Burton Gallery
- 1997 Despard Christmas Show, Despard Gallery, Hobart
- 1996 The Bowl Show Crowded House Design, Melbourne
- 1996 Ici un bout du monde, here one corner of the world The Gentilly Biennale, Paris
- 1995 Dreamtime ‘96 Power House Museum, Sydney
- 1995 Sidney Myer Fund. Australia Day Ceramic Award 1995? Shepparton Arts Centre
- 1995 Oceania Stage Trade Fair Kyushu 1995? Japan
- 1995 City of Glen Eira Artists Award Caulfield Arts Complex
- 1994 Australian Contemporary Art Fair Exhibition Building Melbourne
- (Represented by Holdsworth Gallery, Sydney)
- 1994 Celebrating Women: The Domain of the Other, National Gallery, Victoria
- 1994 Travesties of Art, Blaxland Gallery Myer Melbourne
- 1994 Objects of Desire Caulfield Arts Complex
- 1994 Caulfield Artists Award Caulfield Arts Complex
- 1994 New Import Showcase Fair Osaka, Japan
- 1993 Australia Day Ceramic Award Exhibition Shepparton Art Centre
- 1993, April to 4 May: The Love Show, Trudy Clutterbok, John Golding, Bronwyn Halls, Leigh Hobbs, Pamela Irving, Nicole McKinnon, Frey Micklethwait, Doris Unger, Mitch Vane, Jo Waite and Kelly Wall. Blaxland Gallery, Myer Melbourne
- 1992 Australia Day Ceramic Award Exhibition Shepparton Art Centre
- 1992 International Women’s Day exhibition window No Vacancy, 189 Collins Street, Melbourne.
- 1992 James Street Gallery, Group Exhibition.
- 1992, 1–13 September: Art Imitating Life,Irving with Noel Flood, Mark Strizic, Werner Hammerstingl. Caulfield Arts Centre
- 1991 Art Angels Blaxland Gallery, Melbourne
- 1991, October–November: Irving & Irving:Past and Present World of Art Gallery, Melbourne
- 1991 Australia Day Ceramic Award Exhibition Shepparton Art Centre
- 1991 The Clothesline Trail Front of National Gallery, Victoria
- 1990 Contemporary Australian Arts Fair Exhibition Buildings, Melbourne
- (represented by Holdsworth Gallery, Sydney)
- 1990 Southlawn Sculpture Exhibition Melbourne University
- 1989 Rare II Artery Gallery, Geelong
- 1989 Bricks & Beyond Brickworks, Tasmania
- 1988 Canada/Australia Art Exchange Calgary, Alberta, Canada (Winter Olympics)
- Toured Canada and North America
- 1988 R.M.I.T. Ceramic Staff R.M.I.T. Gallery
- 1988 Australian Crafts Meat Market Craft Centre
- 1988 Bricks & Beyond* The Design Centre, Hobart,* Cockatoo Gallery, Hobart,
- * The Sheraton Hotel,* Brisbane Expo. Tasmanian Pavilion
- 1988 Sausage Sizzle Gryphon Gallery Melbourne College of Advanced Education
- 1988 Osewold, Wilke, Irving & Wiggs QDOS Gallery, Lorne
- 1988 Australian Sculpture Beaver Galleries, Canberra
- 1989 Bricks & Beyond Brickworks, Tasmania
- 1987 Group Show Tim Hogan Fine Art
- 1987 Survey 8: Cuthbertson, Rowe, Irving & Kemp Geelong Art Gallery
- 1987 Introduction to Sculpture Healesville Arts Centre
- 1987 Australian Ceramic Sculptors Distelfink Gallery
- 1987 Deakin University Acquisition Exhibition Deakin University
- 1985 Australian Crafts Meat Market Craft Centre
- 1985 City of Footscray Prize Exhibition Footscray Town Hall
- 1985 Ten Victorian Ceramicists R.M.I.T. Gallery
- 1985 4th National Ceramics Conference Speakers Exhibition University of Melbourne
- 1985 Victorian Ceramic Sculptors Profile Gallery
- 1985 Card Games: Flood, Hearn, Spurrier & Irving Studio Gallery, Tasmania
- 1984 Fifth Anniversary Exhibition Profile Gallery
- 1984 Victorian Ceramic Group Caulfield Arts Centre
- 1984 Current Visions in Intimate Sculpture Profile Gallery
- 1982 Victorian Ceramic GroupCaulfield Arts Centre
- 1982 Limited Containers Gryphon Gallery, Melbourne
- 1982 Graduate Exhibition Chrysalis Gallery
- 1982 Walker Ceramic Awards Caulfield Arts Centre
- 1981 The Sentiment is Genuine Gryphon Gallery, Melbourne

== Collections ==
Irving's work is held in the following collections:

=== Museums and galleries ===
- Museum Victoria
- Collezione Mosaici Moderni
- University of Melbourne including Trinity College
- Deakin University
- Australian Catholic University
- Burnie College of TAFE, Tasmania
- Artbank
- Melbourne City Council
- Shepparton Art Gallery
- Bendigo Art Gallery
- Colac Otway Shire
- Footscray City Art Collection
- Geelong Art Gallery
- City of Glen Eira
- City of Hume
- Wangaratta Exhibitions Gallery
- City of Whitehorse
- City of Wyndham

=== Corporate and private collections ===
- ANZ Bank
- Art Horses Pty Ltd
- L’Oreal Australia
- Monash Medical Centre, Clayton
- Murray Goulburn Co-operative
- Northern Hospital
- Pacific Shopping Centres
- Polypacific
- Sushi King
- Yooralla Society
- Zart Art
- Private collections throughout Australia, the US and Hong Kong including that of Germaine Greer, Tuscany

=== School collections ===
- Abbotsleigh School for Girls, Sydney
- Camberwell Grammar School, Melbourne
- Corio North High School
- Grimwade House, Melbourne Grammar School
- Kew High School
- Lara Lake Primary School
- Lilydale West Primary School
- Lowther Hall Anglican Grammar School
- Mentone Girls Grammar School, Melbourne
- Mentone Grammar School, Melbourne
- Merton Hall, Melbourne Girls Grammar School
- Methodist Ladies' College (MLC), Melbourne
- Scotch College, Melbourne
- Star of the Sea College, Gardenvale
- Tintern Girls' Grammar School, Melbourne
- Wesley College, Melbourne (Elsternwick Campus)

== Awards and grants ==
- 1981 Nominated Kamel Kiln Award
- 1985 Ceramic Prize, City of Box Hill
- 1985 Ceramic Prize, City of Footscray
- 1987 Ministry for the Arts and Ministry for Education Artist in Schools Project
- 1988 Australia Council Grant To Develop a Body of Ceramic Work.
- 1988 Ministry for Arts and Ministry for Education, Artist in Schools Project
- 1989 Tasmanian Arts Council Grant-Artist in Residency, Tasmania
- 1991 Pat Corrigan Artist Grant, N.A.V.A.
- 1994 Winner, Australia Day Ceramic Award Shepparton Arts Centre.
- 1995 City of Glen Eira Artist Award
- 1999 Artist and Designers in Schools Grant, resident artist at Kew High School
- 2005 Artist in School Grant, Ministry for the Arts and Education
- 2010 Arts Victoria Grant
- 2012 Keep Australia Beautiful Award, Community Action for mosaics at Patterson Station, Bentleigh
- 2015 Cancer Council CEO Awards, Volunteer Group of the Year, Tuxedo Junction Committee
- 2017 Arts Council Grant, Tasmania

== See also ==
- Art of Australia
- List of Australian artists
- Larry La Trobe
