= Swanston Street =

Street in Melbourne, Australia

Swanston Street Victoria
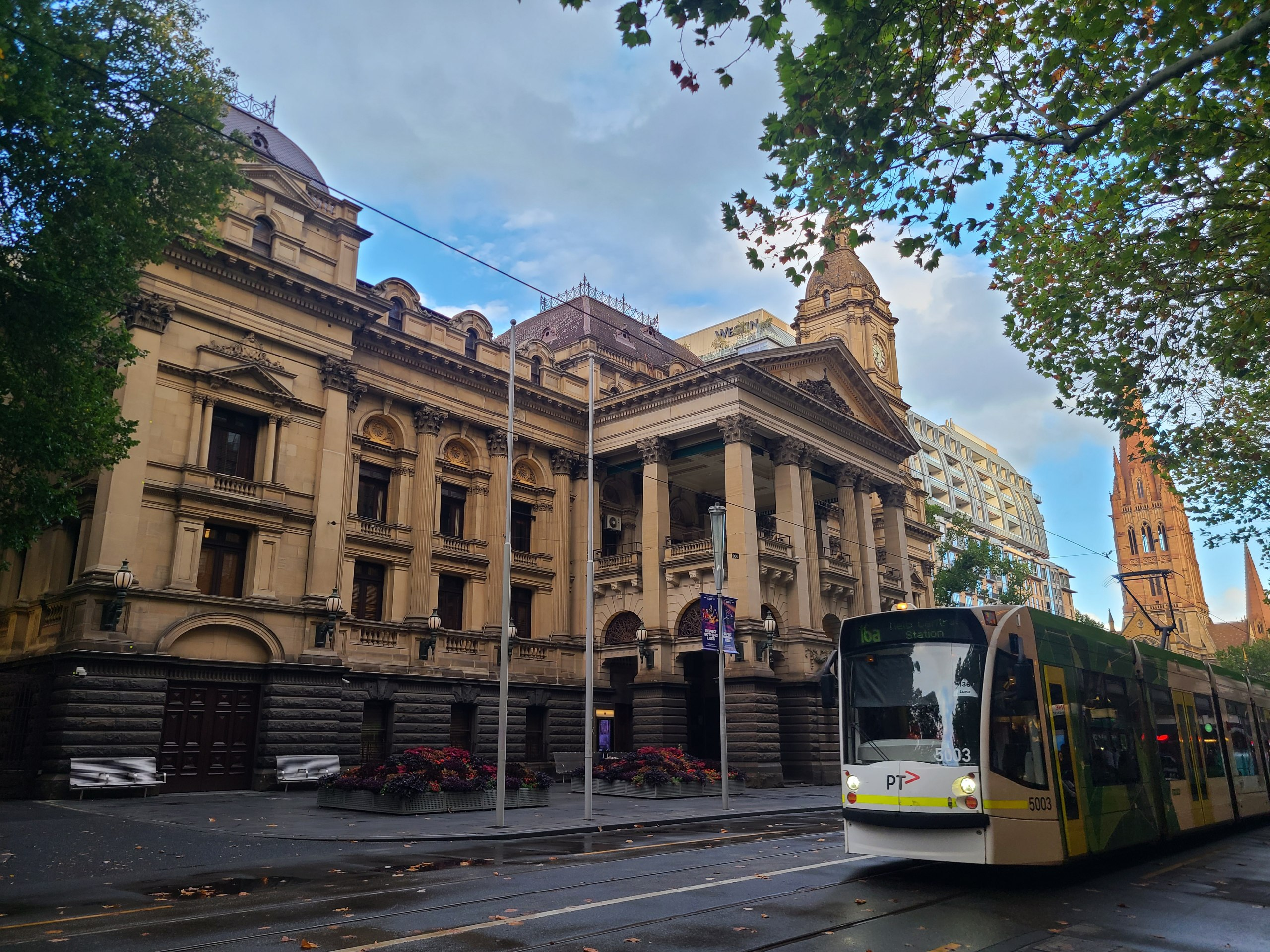
- Swanston Street near Melbourne Town Hall, March 2025
- Coordinates: 37°48′21″S 144°57′47″E

General information
- Type: Street
- Length: 2.8 km (1.7 mi)
- Opened: 1837
- Route number(s): Metro Route 34 (1965–present) (through Parkville)
- Former route number: Metro Route 3 (1965–1989) (through Melbourne)

Major junctions
- North end: Hume Highway; Sydney Road; Princes Hill, Melbourne
- Elgin Street; Queensberry Street; Victoria Street; Franklin Street; La Trobe Street; Lonsdale Street; Bourke Street; Collins Street; Flinders Street
- South end: St Kilda Road; Melbourne CBD

Location(s)
- LGA(s): City of Melbourne
- Suburb(s): Princes Hill, Carlton, Melbourne CBD

Swanston Street is a major thoroughfare in the Melbourne central business district, Victoria, Australia. It was laid out in 1837 as part of the original Hoddle Grid. The street vertically bisects Melbourne's city centre and is famous as the world's busiest tram corridor, for its heritage buildings and as a shopping strip. Before the pedestrianisation of the street, it had two traffic lanes each way and carried 28,000 vehicles per day, 70% of which was through traffic.

Swanston Street runs roughly north–south in-between Russell Street to the east and Elizabeth Street to the west. To the south it becomes St Kilda Road after the intersection with Flinders Street, whilst the road's northern end was originally at La Trobe Street. The street beyond that now known as Swanston Street was originally named Madeline Street, and runs through the suburb of Carlton to Melbourne Cemetery. The street is named after merchant, banker and politician Charles Swanston.

== History ==
Swanston Street was one of the main north–south streets originally laid out as part of the 1837 Hoddle Grid. The early town was concentrated at the western port end, but Swanston Street gained importance with the establishment of a crossing over the Yarra river at this point connecting the main road to the south. A timber bridge in 1845 was replaced by a grand stone one in 1850, in turn replaced by the even grander stone and iron one in 1888 still in use, Princes Bridge. By then the street was lined with large public buildings, office buildings, pubs, hotels and especially shops. Landmarks of included the Melbourne Town Hall and the State Library. The street also accommodated numerous cable tram lines that spread into the southern suburbs. With the advent of the automobile in the early 20th century, the street became a major but crowded north-south route carrying car traffic from areas north of the city through to St Kilda Road, which continued throughout most of the 20th century. By the 1930s, after replacement of the cable cars with electric trams, the street carried nine tram routes, with the frequency of trams being one of the highest in the world. By then more larger office and retail buildings and banks lined the street, including landmarks like the Nicholas Building and the Manchester Unity Building.

In the latter half of the 20th century, the street had problems with heavy traffic and its associated pollution, homelessness, and loitering. Along with St Paul's Anglican Cathedral, the Town Hall and a city square, the east side of the street also included cafes, sex shops, soft porn cinemas interspersed with other medium quality mainstream retailers.

=== Pedestrianisation ===
Swanston Street was one of the busiest roads in Melbourne, carrying 28,000 vehicles per day, 70% of which was through traffic.

In 1982, Rolf Monheim proposed pedestrianisation of the street.

==== 1985 Swanston Street party ====
As part of Victoria's 150th birthday celebrations, three blocks of Swanston Street was closed to traffic, turfed and treed between Flinders Street and Lonsdale Street for a Summer street-party on 9-10 February 1985. The party was organised by the Ministery for Planning and Environment. The conversation then began around the permanent transformation of Swanston Street.

==== 1992 Swanston Walk ====
In March 1992, the street was closed to daytime private through-traffic between Flinders and La Trobe Streets, roughly half its length, with limited exemptions for small freight, buses and private cars during certain times of the day. After that, proposals for the street to become entirely car-free gained momentum. This project or section is known as Swanston Street Walk or Swanston Walk.

The street was closed to through traffic on March 24 1992 for construction to commence.

On the first day of Swanston Walk, VicRoads monitored traffic at 14 locations. Two of the 14 locations were reported to have heavier than normal at any time of the day. One of the two most congested areas had a crane parked in a clearway during the morning peak hour. By 5:30pm, 6 of the 14 locations were flowing more smoothly than usual, and the remaining locations were functioning as normal.

After the opening in 1992, the Transport Minister Mr Spyker said he was convinced the system would work well in the long term, but was concerned about immediate disruption in the short term. Keith Blyth, CEO of the RACV, stated in the medium or long term the changes wouldn't work. He stated "This week there will be adjustments and it will work satisfactorily for a year or two, or maybe three." Mr Birrell, the major projects spokesperson of the Victorian opposition, described Swanston Walk as unwelcome experiment and an expensive gimmick, stating it was foolish to close a city street without first linking Melbourne's freeways with a ring road.

In 1992, Nigel Flannigan stated that while he was broadly supportive of the philosophy, he stated its success would be judged on the private property market improving the quality of nearby retail opportunities, that the space wouldn't be able to be utilised except for festival occasions, the lack of additional public transport improvements through the transit concourse, and that it was accompanied with road works elsewhere to increase vehicle capacity.

One of the problems in 1992 was the conflicting philosophies of Urban Design Unit of the City of Melbourne council, and VicRoads facilitating vehicle traffic.

A number of public sculptures have been established through the Percent for Art Program. The most famous of these statues is of a small bronze dog called Larry La Trobe by Melbourne artist, Pamela Irving.

==== 2008 proposal to re-introduce vehicles ====
In November 2008, the newly elected Lord Mayor of Melbourne Robert Doyle proposed returning private vehicle traffic to the street. The move attracted opposition from the Public Transport Users Association, Australian Greens and Bicycle Victoria. The idea was rejected and, by January 2010, plans to make the entire length of Swanston Street in the city car-free were announced by the Lord Mayor himself, a complete reversal of his previous stance.

==== Changes in 2010 ====
In 2009, 6 options were proposed for the future of the street.

On 27 January 2010, it was announced that the entire length of Swanston Street up to Franklin Street would become car free. The $25.6 million proposal involved extending the footpath by about four metres, allowing room for two avenues of plane trees, planting, seating, kiosks, bicycle parking, sculptures and the like. Tram stops were created by extending the footpath up to the tracks for the length of a block at Collins, Bourke, La Trobe and Franklin Streets. A major bicycle route was created down the street, which shares the footpath at the new tram stops. The only other access allowed was for emergency vehicles and small-scale freight at certain times. The modifications to the street commenced in late 2011 and were completed in late 2012.

In September 2012, the resulting number of people walking on Swanston Street was at or near 11 people per metre per minute, indicating a very high density of foot traffic.

In an alternative outreach strategy, comedians were engaged to communicate the new arrangement.

=== Use for marches, rallies and protests ===
Many marches, rallies and protests involve the use of Swanston Street, resulting in planned and unplanned road closures. The street is the venue for many annual events, including the Moomba parade, the AFL Grand Final parade and Melbourne Cup parade. It is also the major route for the Anzac Day parade because Swanston Street leads into St Kilda Road, the site of the Shrine of Remembrance.

== Notable buildings ==
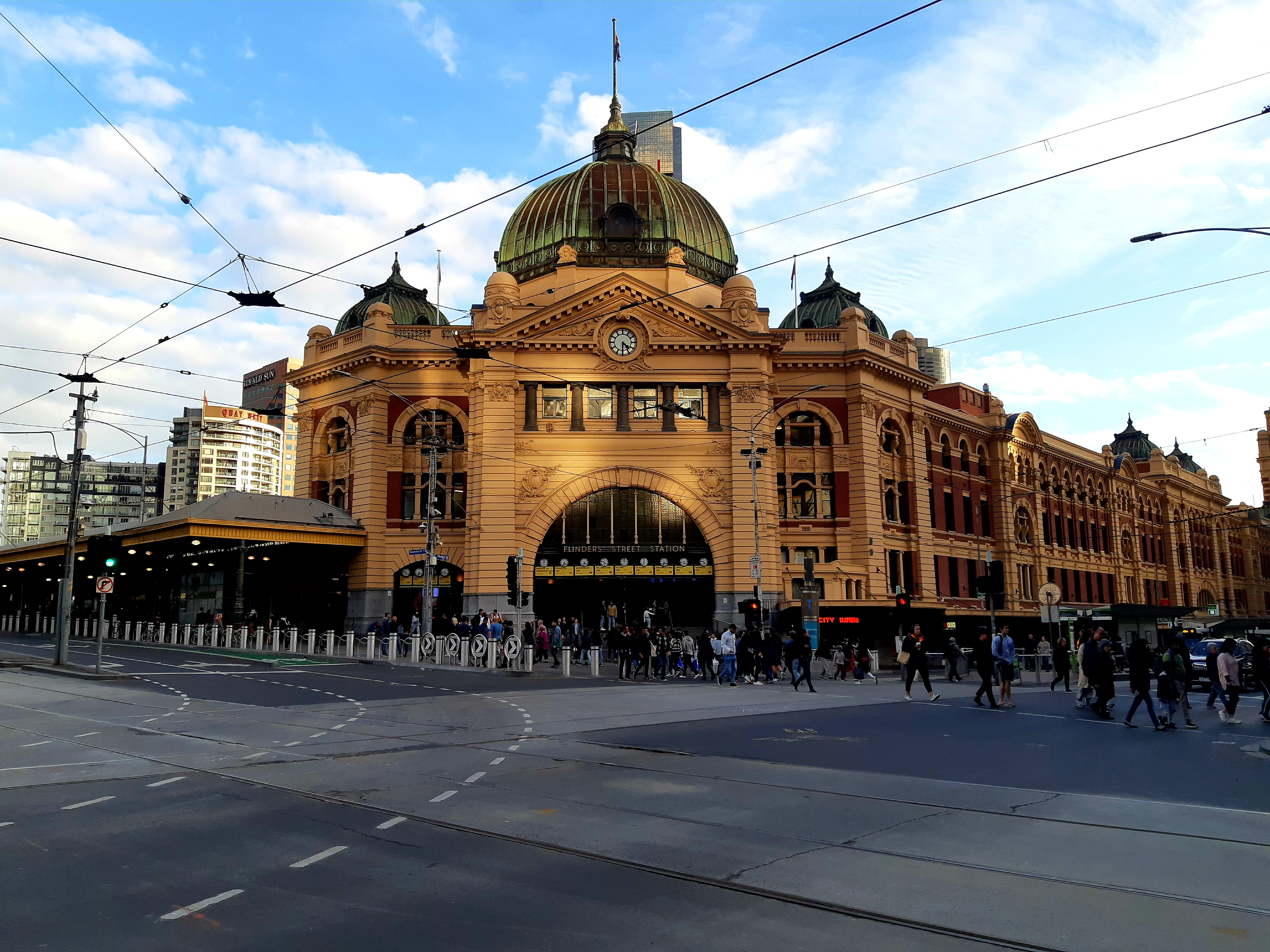
Flinders Street station

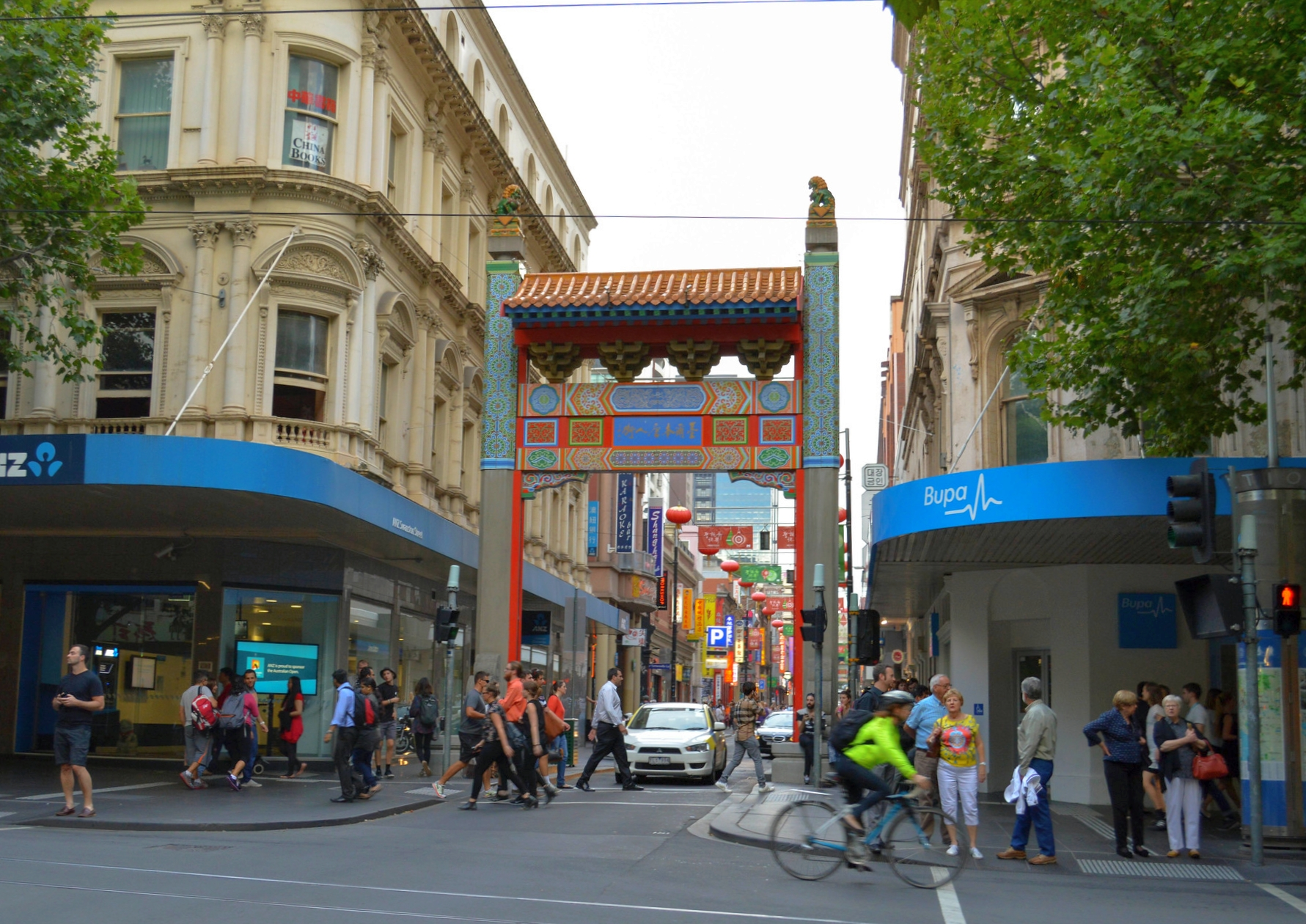
The Chinatown Archway on Swanston Street

Many of Melbourne's most noteworthy precincts and prominent buildings face Swanston Street as the city's historic main avenue, including:

- Flinders Street railway station
- Federation Square
- Young and Jackson Hotel
- Nicholas Building
- St Paul's Cathedral
- Melbourne Town Hall
- Capitol Theatre
- City Square
- Westin Hotel Melbourne
- Manchester Unity Building
- Curtin House
- Chinatown Archway
- QV Village
- State Library of Victoria
- Melbourne Central Shopping Centre
- City Baths

Both the University of Melbourne and RMIT University also have campus buildings fronting Swanston Street.

== Transport ==
Tram routes 1, 3, 5, 6, 16, 64, 67 and 72 currently run along the street, with the frequency of trams making Swanston Street the world's busiest tram corridor. Two of the busiest railway stations in Melbourne are located near the street, with the hub Flinders Street station at its southern end and, further north, the underground Melbourne Central station at the intersection of La Trobe Street. The Metro Tunnel, which runs under Swanston Street, was opened to the public in late 2025, with Town Hall and State Library stations being adjacent to and connected with Flinders Street and Melbourne Central stations respectively.

Swanston Street is also a major route for commuting cyclists to and through the city, with bike lanes from the northern suburbs and from St Kilda Road in the south, and the Capital City Trail on the Southbank of the Yarra River.

The parking of tour buses along the street caused controversy in September 2008 when a young cyclist was killed by a bus as it turned out of a parking spot. There had previously been calls to the council to relocate the large buses from the street where there was little space between buses and trams.

Swanston Street was previously served by bus services to Gardenvale and Middle Brighton. When Melbourne-Brighton Bus Lines' licence periodically came up for review, the Melbourne City Council and Melbourne & Metropolitan Tramways Board always opposed. Finally the buses were removed from Swanston Street in October 1989, by which time they were operated by the Public Transport Corporation.

== In popular culture ==
Swanston Street was the shooting location for the 1976 video for AC/DC's song "It's a Long Way to the Top (If You Wanna Rock 'n' Roll)". It led to a nearby street being renamed ACDC Lane in honour of the music video.

It is also referenced in The Distillers' song "Dismantle Me", as singer Brody Dalle is originally from Melbourne, as well as TISM's song "Get Thee in My Behind Satan" and Courtney Barnett's "Elevator Operator".

Jane Halifax (Rebecca Gibney) of the Halifax f.p. television series is shown living in an apartment at 339 Swanston Street (Jensen House; now converted into a UniLodge) opposite the State Library.

== Gallery ==
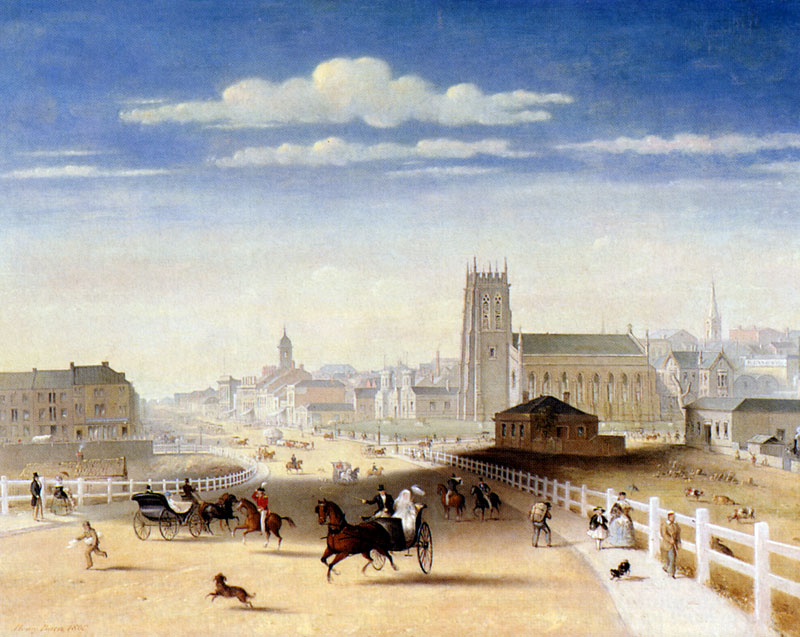
Henry Burn, Swanston Street from Princes Bridge, 1861

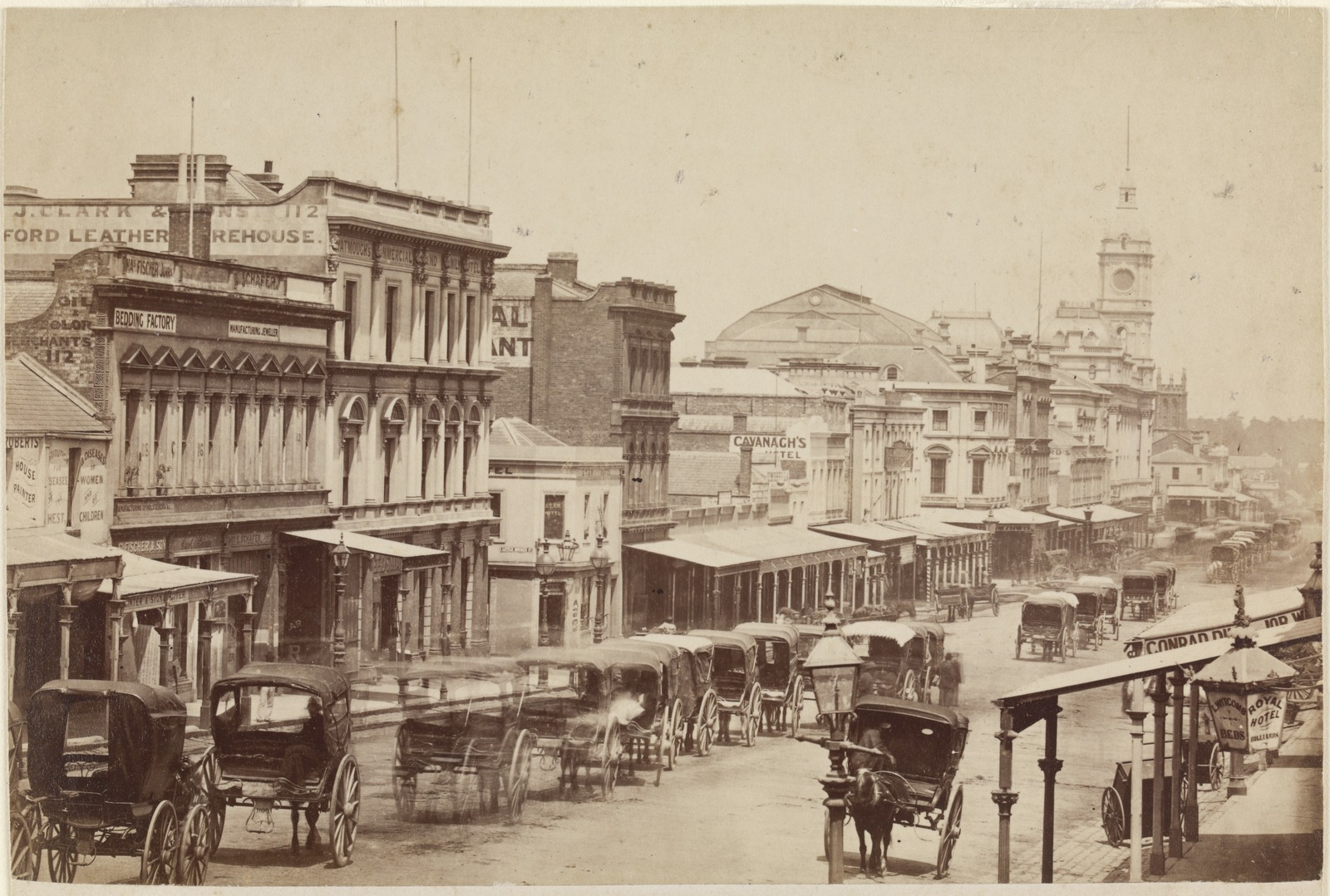
Swanston Street c. 1873 Charles Nettleton State Library Victoria H88.21/9

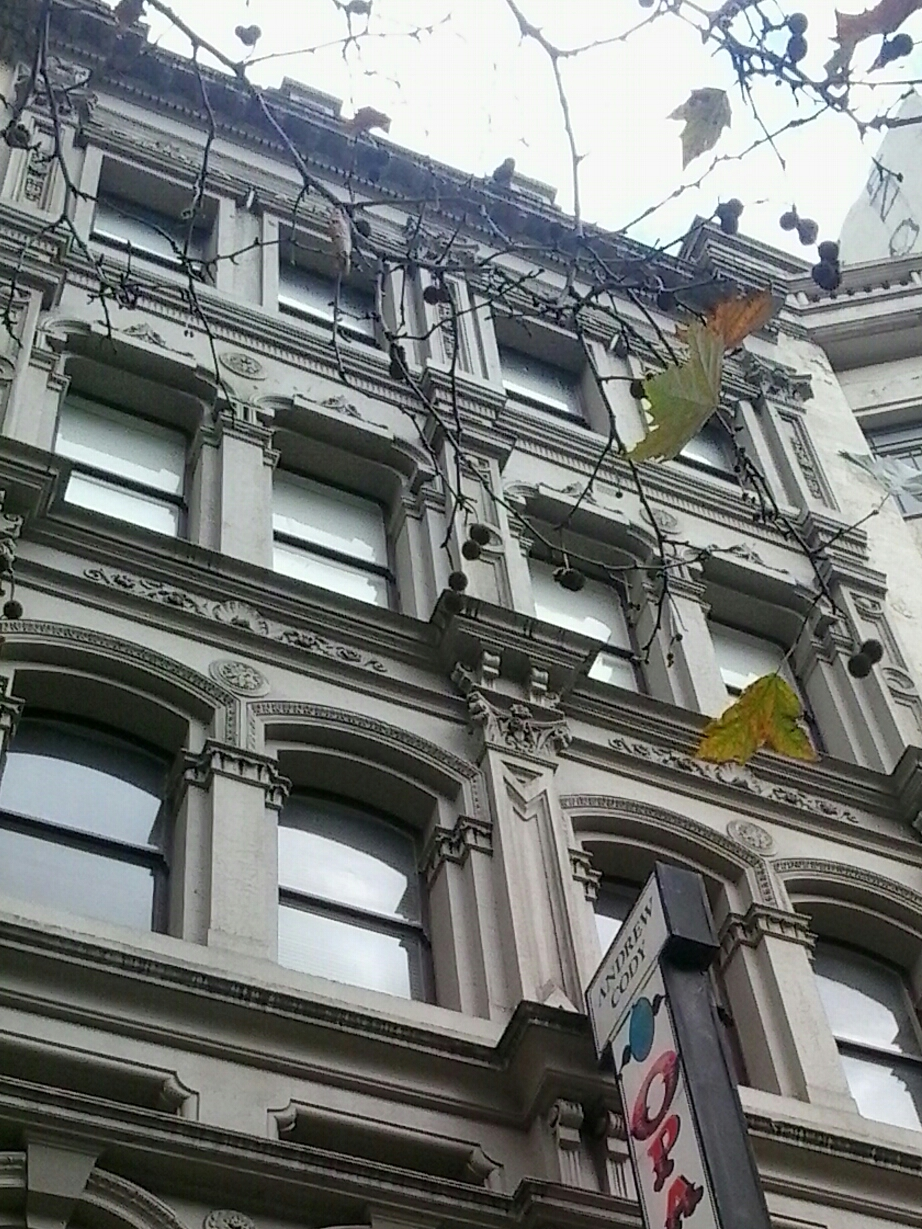
Buxton's Rooms on Swanston Street, which were the site of the 9 by 5 Impression Exhibition in 1889

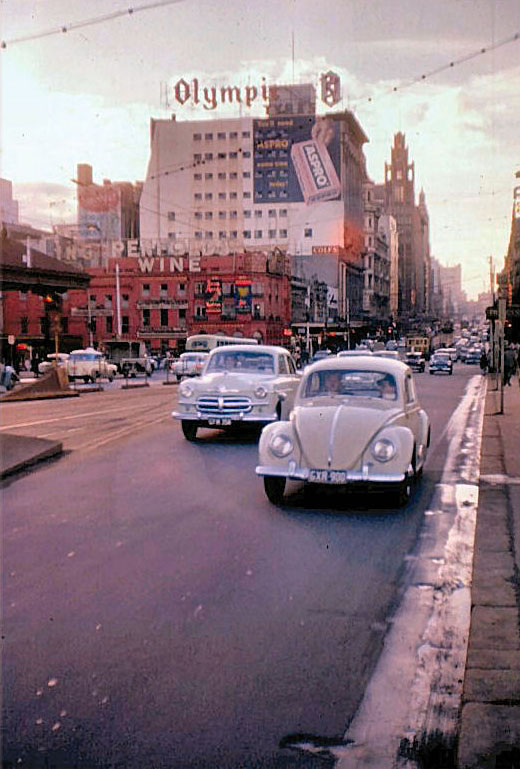
Swanston Street, looking north from Princes Bridge, 1959

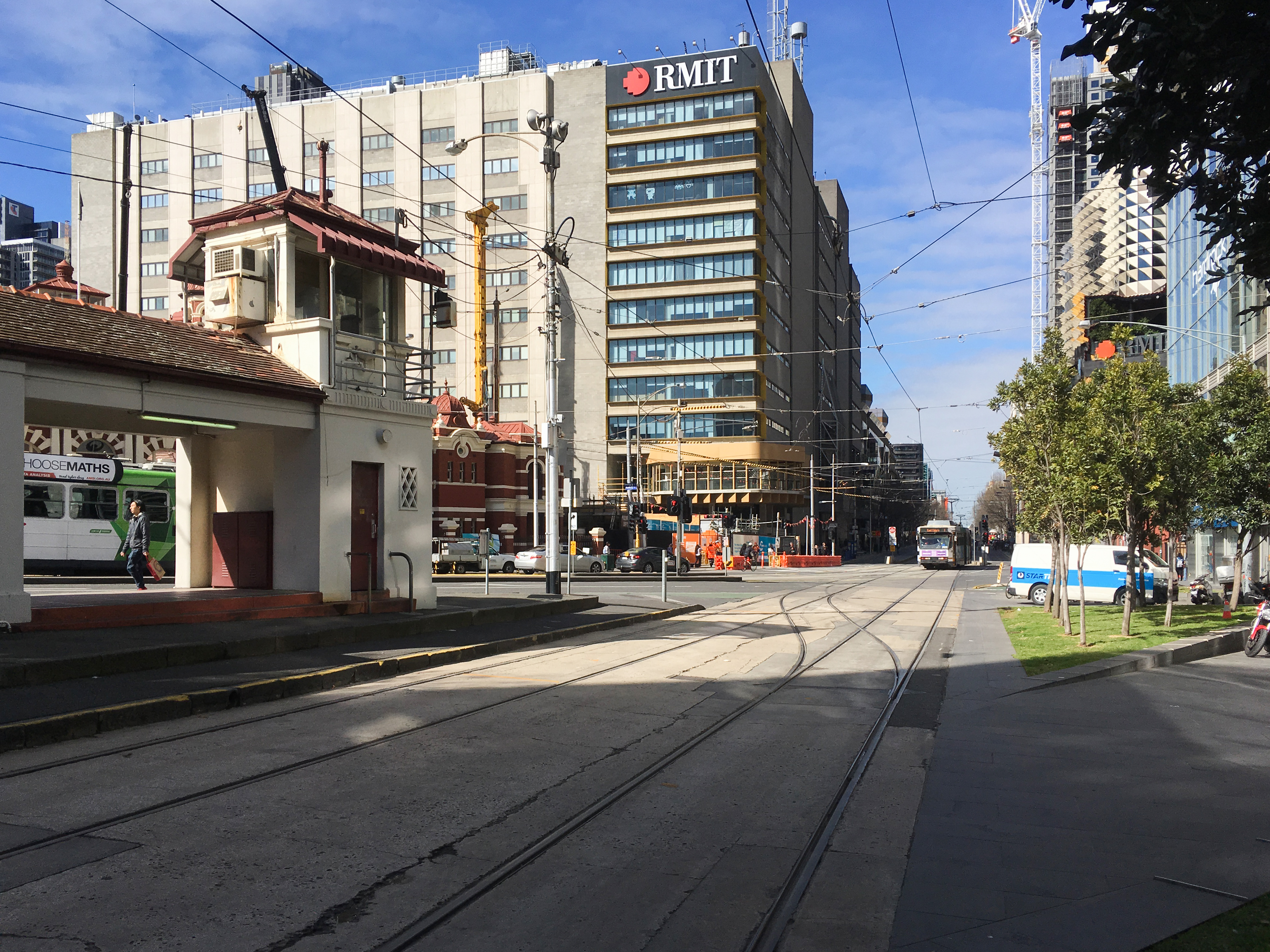
Swanston Street near RMIT, August 2017

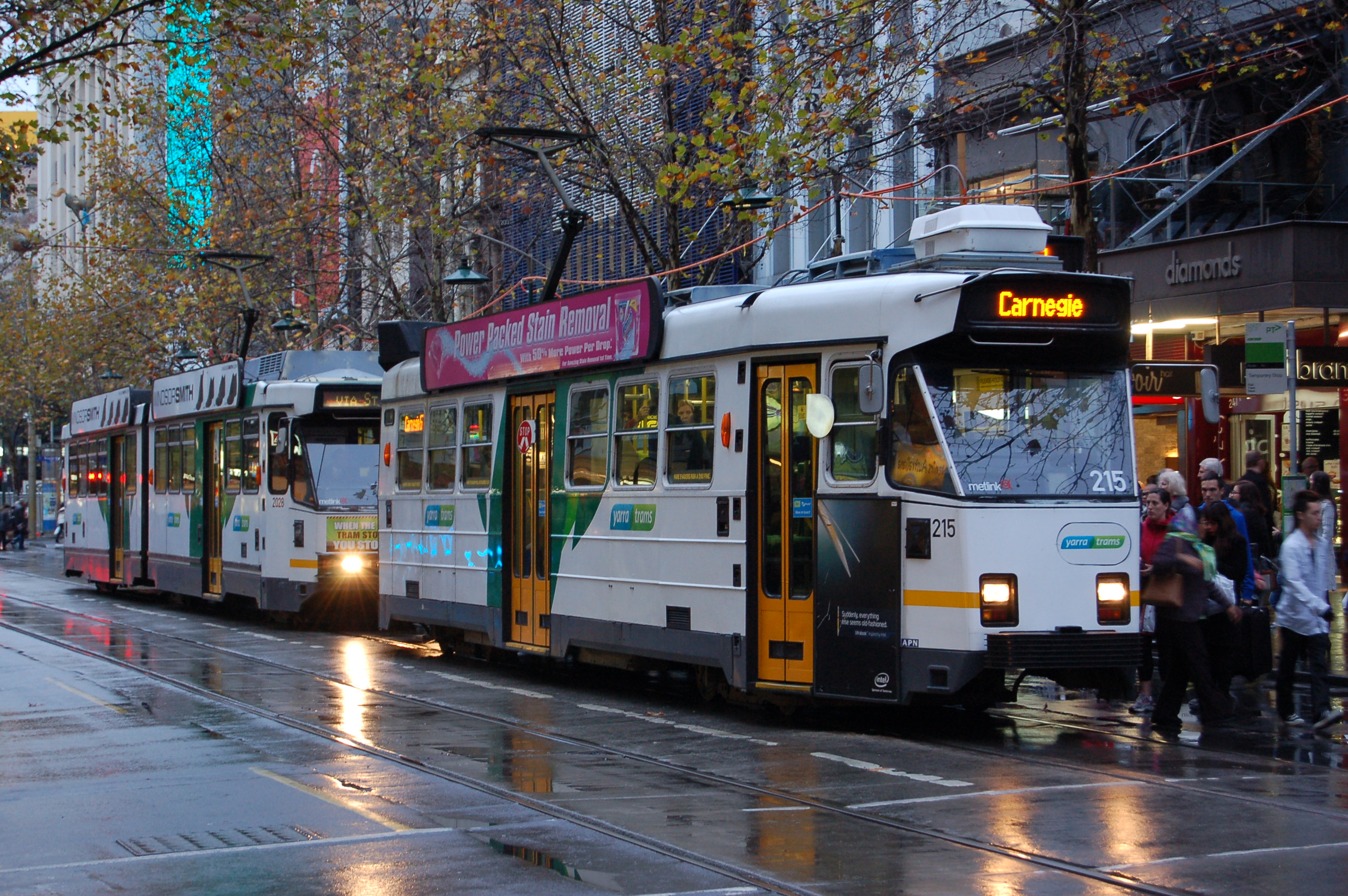
A pair of southbound Melbourne trams embark passengers in Swanston Street just north of Little Collins Street, May 2012

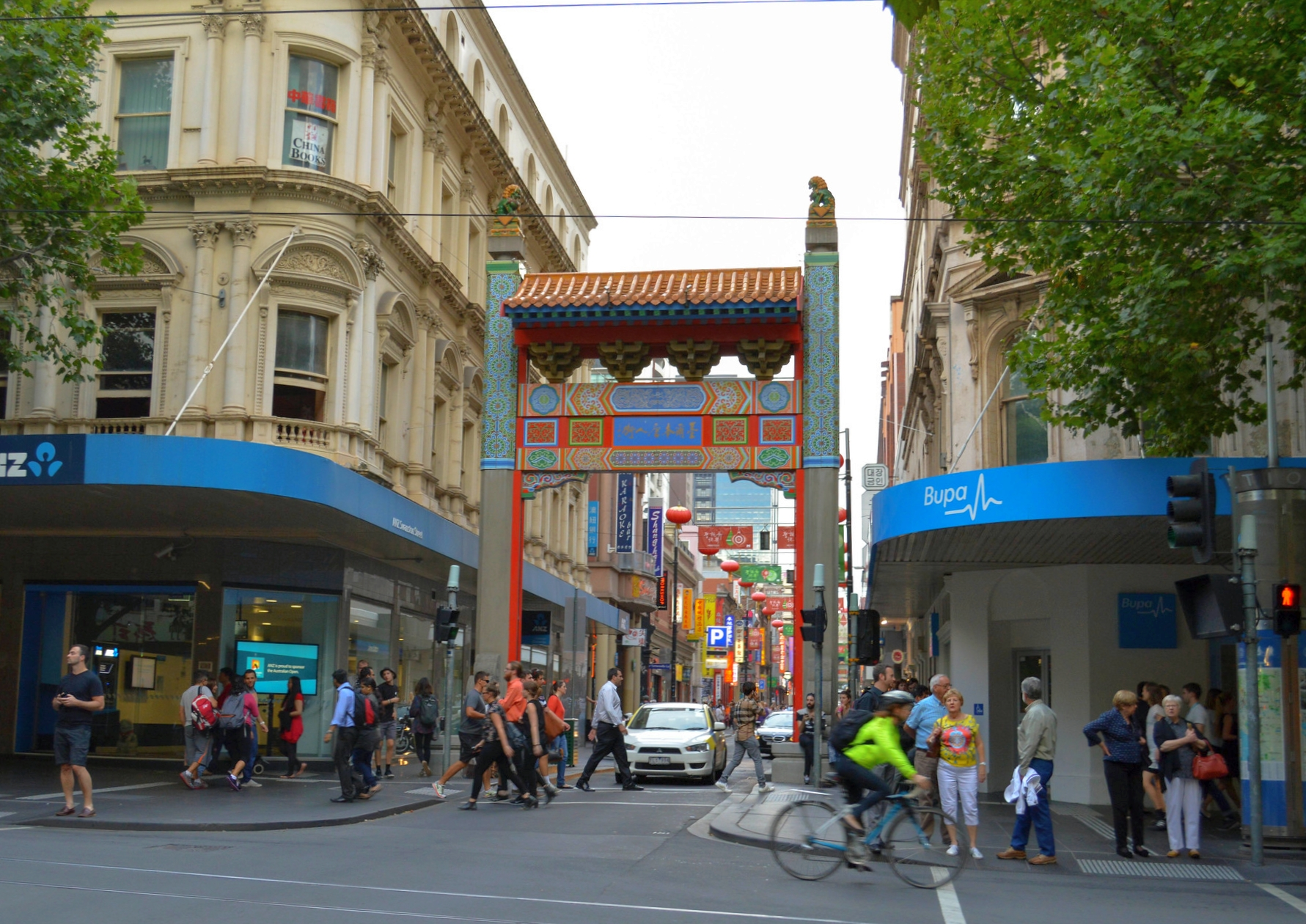
Archway to Melbourne Chinatown on Swanston Street, January 2015

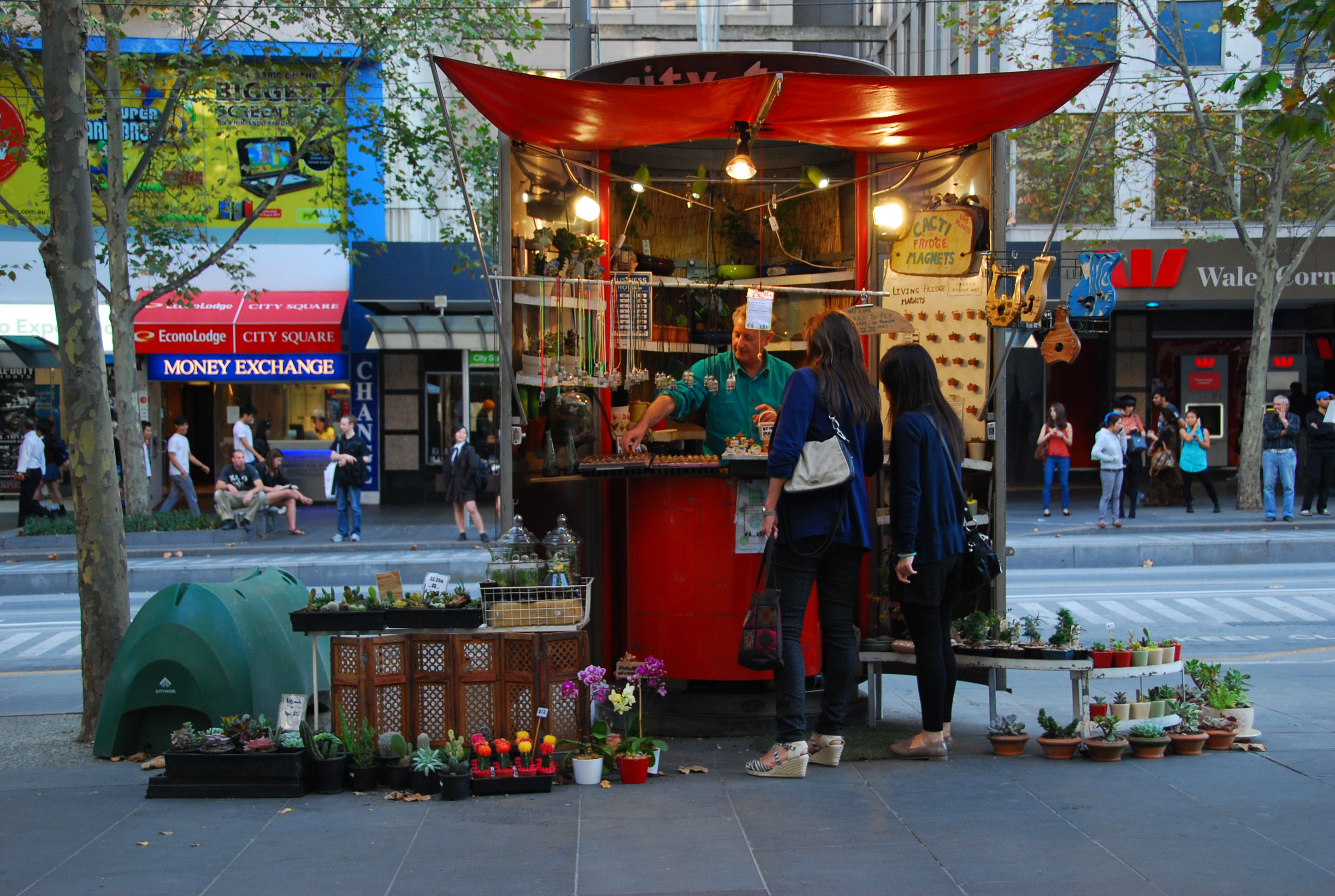
A street stall on Swanston Street, May 2013

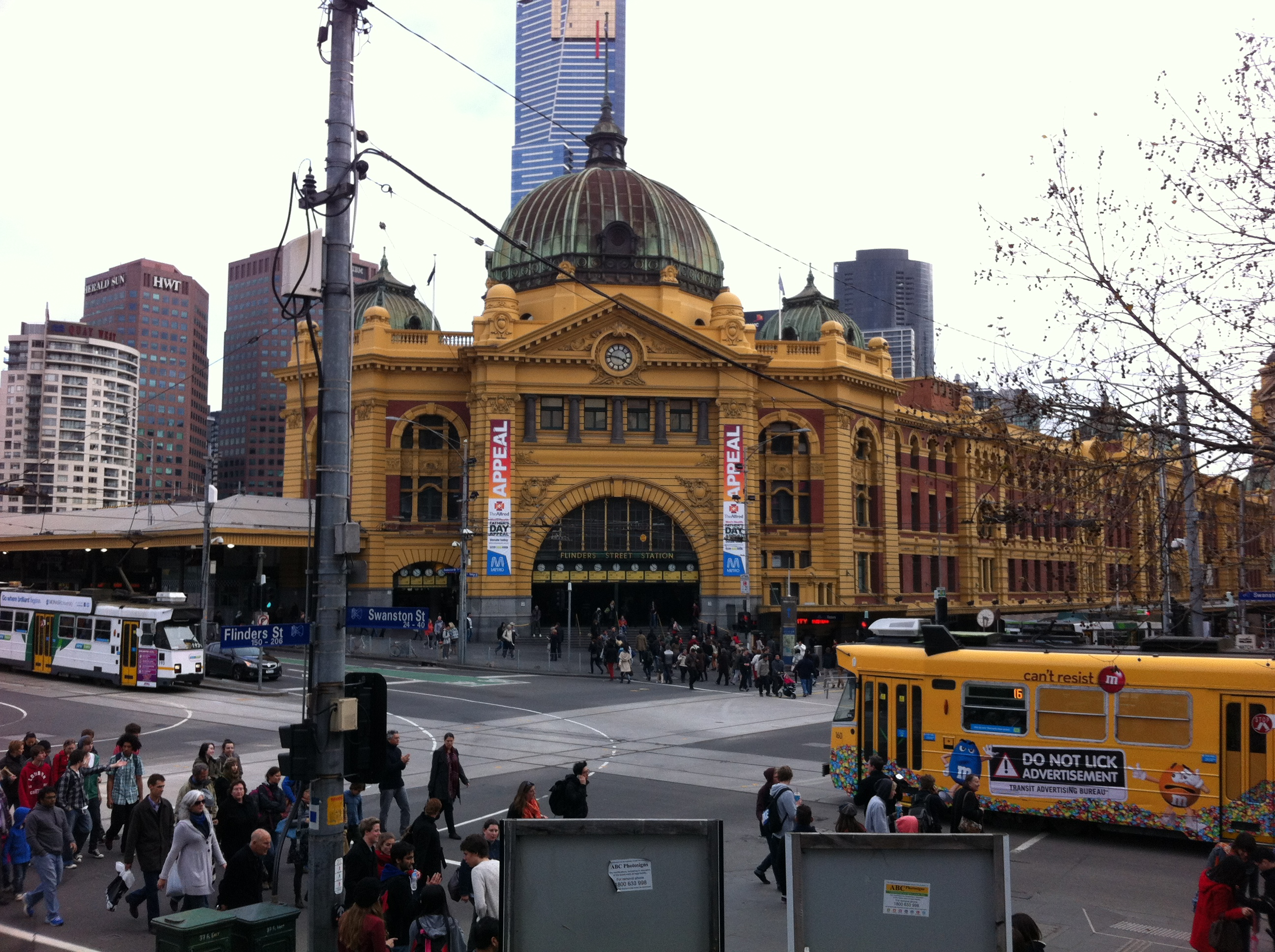
Flinders Street station, on the corner of Flinders and Swanston streets, August 2012

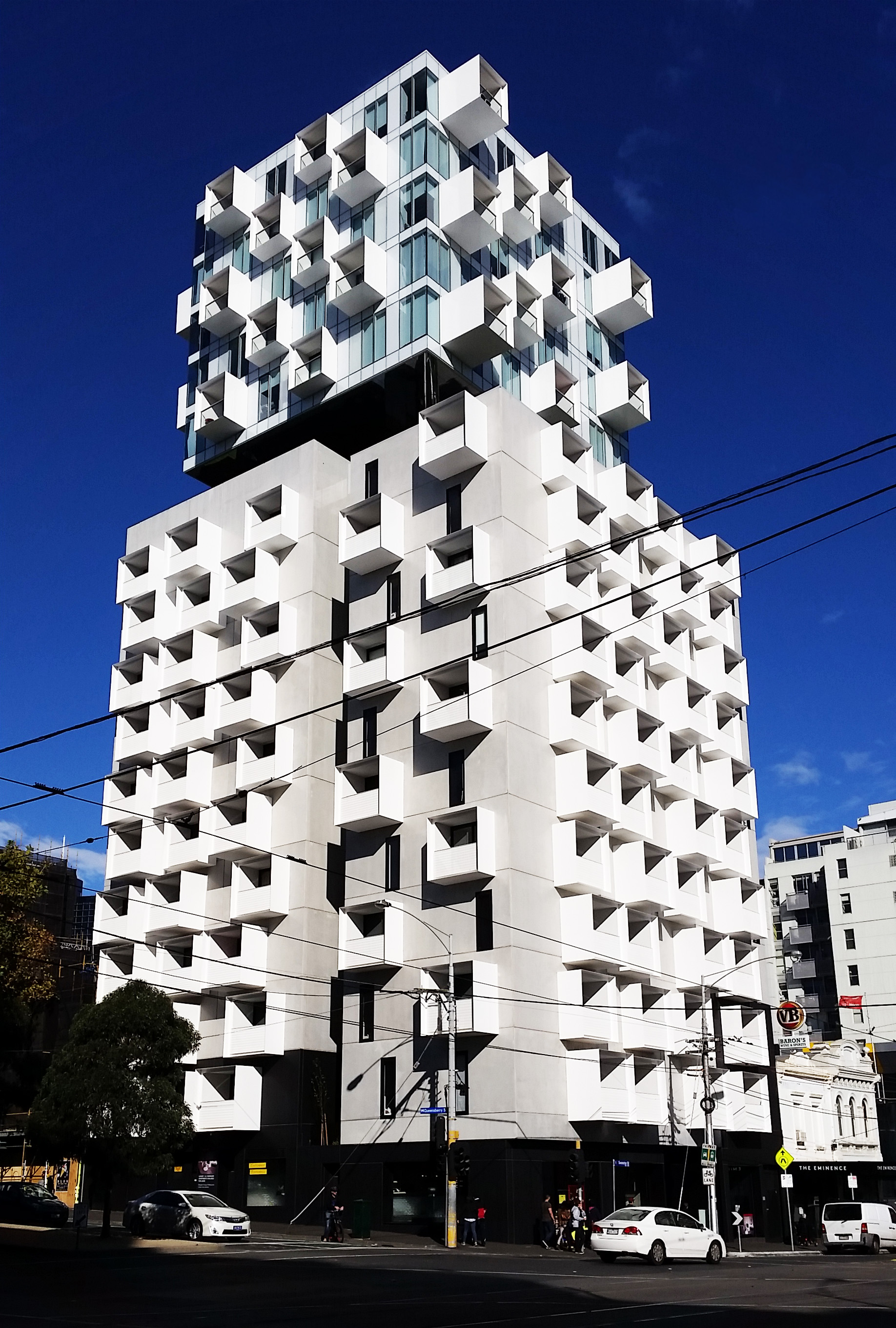
Upper House, on the corner of Swanston and Queensbury Streets
