= Otto Hitzberger =

German sculptor

Otto Kaspar Hitzberger (October 2, 1878 in Munich – July 22, 1964 in Garmisch-Partenkirchen) was a German sculptor.

Hitzberger was the son of the photographer Josef Hitzberger and his wife Anna. In 1883, the family moved to Partenkirchen. From 1891 to 1895, he learned the craft of wood and stone sculpture in Partenkirchen. In Munich, he worked with Joseph Flossmann. Then Hitzberger worked under George of Hauberrisser at Munich New Town Hall as a stonemason.

He perfected his skills as a wood sculptor at an old church sculptor in the Württemberg town of Sussen. He worked throughout Germany, followed by Switzerland, Italy and Austria. In all these countries he worked in many studios and workshops. In 1910, he was again briefly in Partenkirchen, after which he lived for three years in southern Africa, where he worked on altar figures for Boer churches, and cabinets and door panels for farm-houses.

In 1914, he returned to Germany, after Berlin, where he became head of the workshop until 1917, Josef Wackerles was. In 1917, he was appointed by Bruno Paul to head the wood and stone sculpture class at the educational institutions of the Berlin Museum of Decorative Arts. In 1924, with the union of the higher schools of art, Hitzberger moved to Charlottenburg as head of a training workshop for wood and stone sculpture. He held this office until 1943.

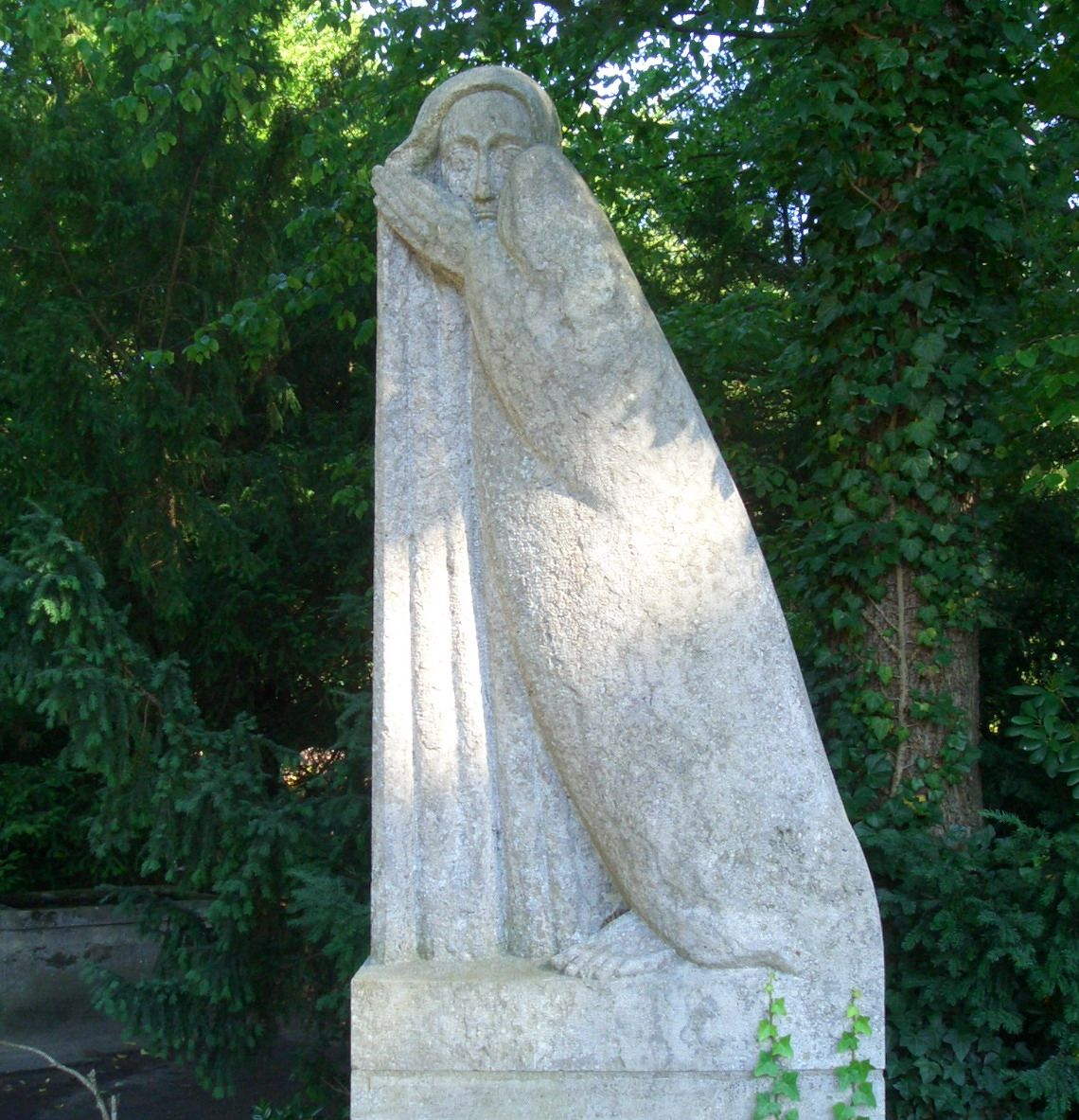
Cemetery Ruhleben : Mourners of Otto Hitzberger (1927), founded in 2003 for the non-existent grave of the factory owner, art collector and front fighter Heinrich Richard Brinn, murdered at Auschwitz-Birkenau in 1944.

His work consisted among others in the collaboration in the design of facades and interiors with well-known architects, plastic decoration for interior, reliefs and sculptures full. During the First World War, he was commissioned to the copy the figure of Christ in the Trier Church of Our Lady to copy to preserve the originals from war damage. He also took on the difficult technical part of the a giant statue of Christ by Ludwig Gies, who, after the partial destruction by citizen of Lübeck, was again restored by the maintenance department of the trade show in Munich. The figure was exhibited in the National Socialism as "degenerate" and was probably destroyed later. In 1938, three of Hitzbergers works were exhibited in the Exhibition of Degenerate Art.

After the war, he developed in Garmisch-Partenkirchen, a late work, which is characterized by unusual vitality and superior wisdom and religiousness.

Hitzberger was married twice. From 1902 in Munich closed marriage to Victoria Gaugler (1876-1942) had three children: Anna (born 1903), Otto Georg (born 1904, sculptor) and Friederike (1906). This marriage ended in divorce in 1918. With Martha, divorced Bernhard, born Maass, 1922 in Berlin, he joined his second marriage, which was childless.

== Honours ==
For his 75th birthday in 1953 in Garmisch-Partenkirchen, the road Prof. Hitzberger Street was renamed in his honour. He also received the Order of Merit of the Federal Republic of Germany. More tributes were made in 1958 on his 80th birthday (ceremony of the Golden Badge of Honour of the market Garmisch-Partenkirchen) and in 1963 for his 85th birthday when he was awarded honorary citizenship of the market Garmisch-Partenkirchen. In 1964, he was awarded the Papal Medal of Merit Benemerenti.

== Notable students ==
- Inge King (born 1915), German-Australian sculptor
- Imogen Stuart (born 1927), German-Irish sculptor
- Wolfgang Behl (born 1918), German-American sculptor

== Works ==
- 1918: The virtues, four library figures, oak wood
- 1919: Shepherd, filling cabinet, Birnbaum
- 1920: Seated Mother and Child, oak
- 1921: Border Madonna, pine
- 1921: tabernacle, Dominikusstift Berlin-Hermsdorf, brass driven, gold plated, with rock crystals
- 1922: Carved panels, oak
- 1922: Morning, stucco relief for a dining room
- 1922: Evening, stucco relief for a dining room
- 1922: Pietà, basswood
- 1923: Conception, bronze
- 1923: grave cross Hitzberger, Partenkirchen, pine
- 1923: grave stone Field Marshal von Eichhorn, shell limestone, Invalidenfriedhof Berlin
- 1923: Poverty, bronze
- 1923: Christmas crib, oak
- 1923: allegory, stucco relief for a fireplace
- 1924: Christ and Mary Magdalene, oak
- 1924: Sale of Joseph, relief, walnut
- 1926: The Wanderer, oak
- before 1927: mourners, coquina stone, cemetery and crematorium Ruhleben
- before 1929: The Sorrows Passion of the Christ, 14 images carved in wood [
- 1933: Christ, oak, Salvator Church of Berlin-Schmargendorf
- 1934: sarcophagi for Reich President Paul von Hindenburg and his wife [
- 1942: Grave cross (stone), Ernst Hugo Correll, Garmisch
- 1945: War memorial in Wallgau
- 1948: The philosopher, basswood
- 1949: The Last Supper, relief for the former chapel of the Trauma Center Murnau, basswood
- 1951: The Good Shepherd, basswood
- 1955: The Four Seasons, relief, basswood
- 1961: Noah's Ark, relief, Birnbaum
- 1964: Memorial for the fallen students and teachers of high school Garmisch-Partenkirchen, relief, basswood

== Literature ==
- Fritz Hellwag: The works of Otto Hitzberger . In: German Art and Decoration, Vol 49 1921-1922, pp. 326–332
- Josef Maria Frank: The sculptor Otto Hitzberger . In: German Art and Decoration, Vol 53 1923-1924, pp. 85–87
- Oscar Gehrig: Otto Hitzberger . Publisher German-Literary Institute, Berlin 1925
- Wolfgang Schäche include: Siemensbauten in Siemens City - housing estates . Konopka, Berlin 1995
- Karlheinz Klatte, Karl Georg Berger Carving: Professor Otto Hitzberger, private publishing Garmisch-Partenkirchen, 2003
