= Phillip Martin (artist) =

Australian artist

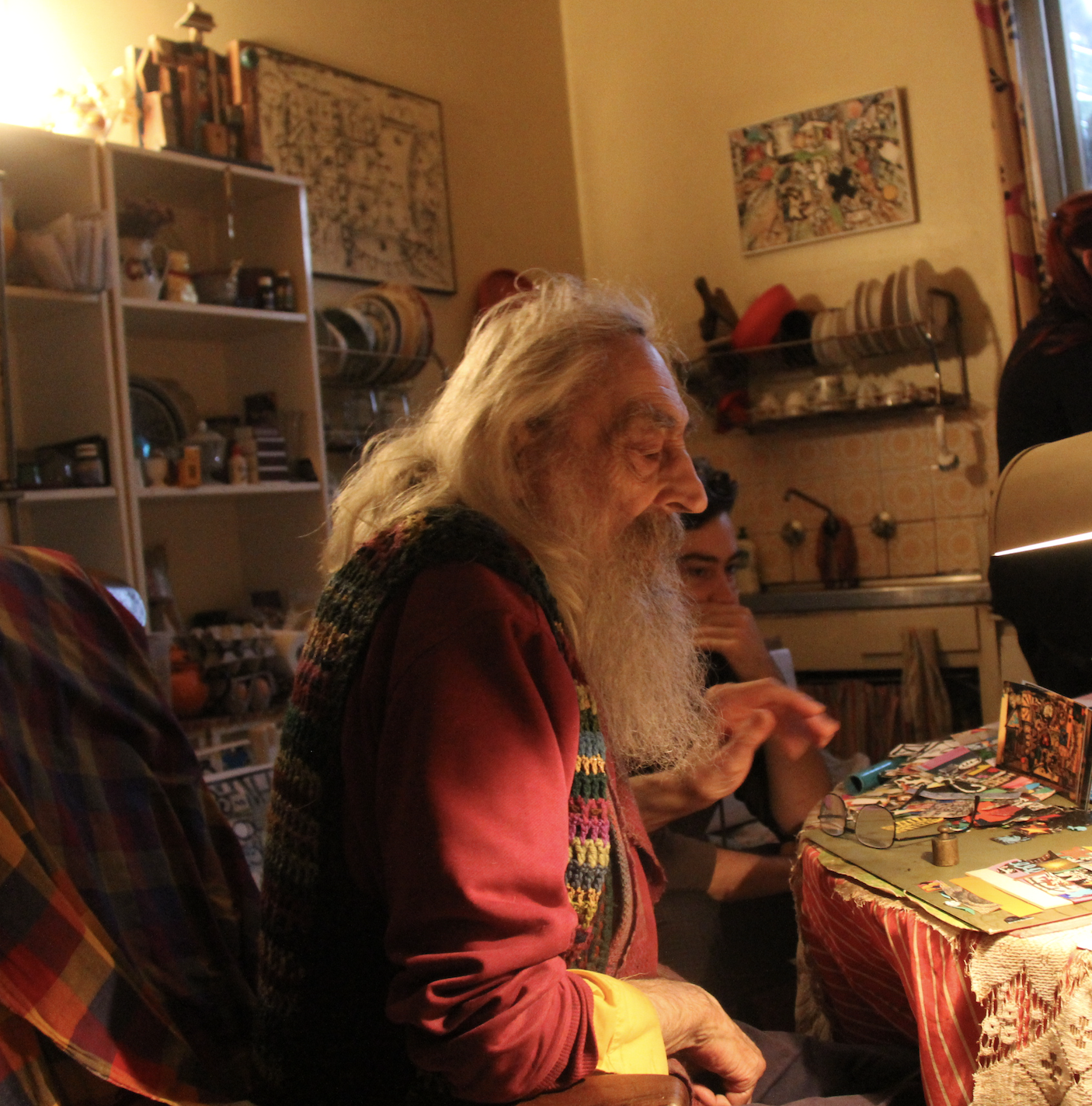
Phillip Martin in his kitchen in 2014

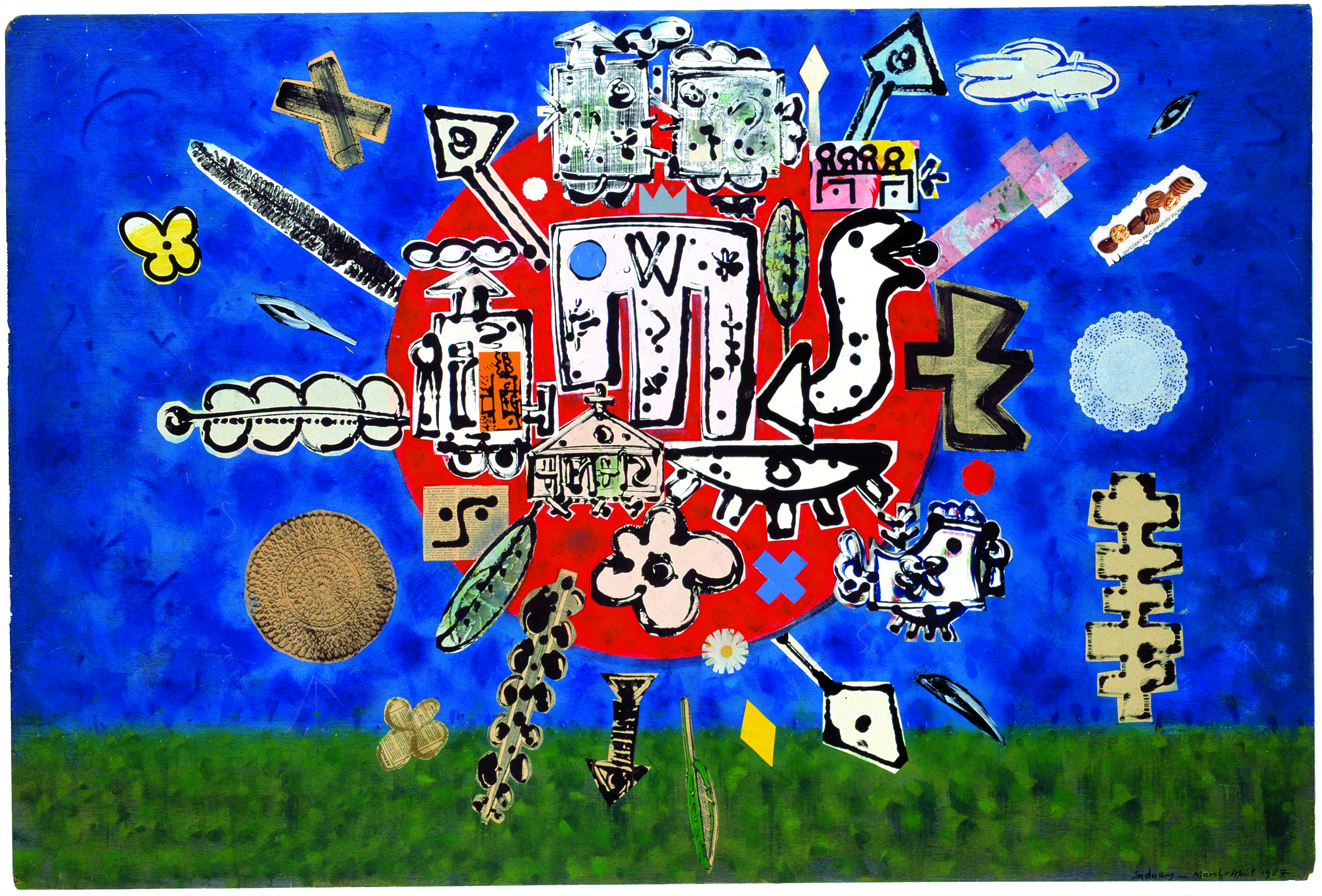
Do you remember the bright journey? 1987- acrylic and collage on board- 182x122cm

Phillip John Martin (1927–2014) was a visionary painter working with collage and sculpture.

== Early life, UK and Ireland ==
Martin was born in 1927 in East Anglia to an Irish family. He was the son of a bank director. He attended Felsted Public school for ten years, between 1938 and 1948. He served three years in the British Royal Navy. In the summer of 1948, he entered the Third Order of Saint Francis brotherhood as a lay brother. He left the order because of differences in philosophy and devoted himself to painting. He then lived in London. He was an artist in residence at the Abbey Arts Centre (London) 1949–1950 where he met Irish Australian fellow artist Helen Marshall (1918–1996) and Stacha Halpern. Phillip Martin... defined by the well-known French critic Alain Jouffroy: “the Gandhi of modern painting”. A globetrotting, hippie artist who painted "spiritual" paintings full of symbols and effigies with decorations to evoke sacred vestments or decorations of oriental temples. Martin had started painting in London in 1948 also encouraged by his painter friend Alan Davie, a little older than him. He later began with his Irish wife Helen Marshall to travel and paint throughout Europe.

== France, Spain and Italy until 1962 ==
1951 journey to Austria, first Affiches painted on packing paper. Becoming the central theme of his work.

1952 travel to Italy, Aix en Provence, Paris. Michel Tapié acquire many affiches, presents them in June at Galerie Facchetti; Les signifiants de l’informel with Camille Bryen, Donati, Gillet, Mathieu, Pollock, Riopelle, and Jaroslav Serpan.Works for six months in Connemara, Ireland and meet Gerard Dillon.

1953–1956 Phillip Martin and his wife Helen Marshall work on their paintings in Positano, Ischia, Florence where they meet Roberto Matta

1956–57 Work in South of France, Aix en Provence meet André Masson and Pierre Alechinsky.

1958–60 working period in Mallorca, Alicante, Ibiza, Formentera. Période of Apocalypses, Reliquaires meet Alan Sillitoe.

1960–62 Return to Paris, Phillip work on a series of paintings Affiches for Ireland. Meet Erró in Paris; and Mark Tobey in Basel.

== Move to India ==
Phillip Martin and his family moved to India, 1962–1969 and settled in the Aurobindoashram, near Pondicherry. They were the first Anglo Saxon family living in the Ashram. Two years later, they travelled back to Brussels and held a major retrospective at the Palais de Beaux arts de Brussels. and Phillip exhibited a second time at Galerie du Dragon in Paris. Back in the south of India, Phillip and his family witnessed the opening of Auroville in 1968. He exhibits in Mumbai at the Jehangir Art Gallery, with Helen Marshall and Bhupen Khakhar.

== Australia, 1969–2014 ==
He returned to Australia in 1969 and exhibited in a joint exhibition with Helen Marshall for the inauguration of the new Holdsworth Galleries in Paddington Sydney. They lived in Melbourne for a year, exhibiting at St Kilda Tolarno Gallery. Living next door to Mirka Mora in Wellington street Prarhan. 1979, Return to Australia, and continue to work and exhibit. He lived in his house in Glebe, New South Wales until the day of his death in 2014.

== Public collections ==
- Museum of Modern Art, MOMA, New York City, USA.
- Centre National d’art Contemporain.
- Detroit Institute of Arts. Detroit, USA.
- Dimona Art Gallery, Israel.
- Municipal Museum of Modern Art, Dublin. Ireland.
- La Boverie. Belgium.
- San Francisco Museum of Modern Art. San Francisco. USA.
- Art Institute of Chicago. Chicago. USA
- Campbeltown regional Art Gallery. Campbeltown, Australia.
- National Gallery of Australia. Canberra. Australia.
- Gladsaxe Kommunes . Danemark.
