= Robert Klippel =

Australian constructivist sculptor and teacher

- Born: 19 June 1920; Sydney, New South Wales, Australia
- Died: 19 June 2001 (aged 81); Sydney, New South Wales, Australia
- Other name: Robert Edward Klippel
- Known for: Sculpture

Robert Klippel AO (19 June 1920 – 19 June 2001) was an Australian constructivist sculptor and teacher. He is often described in contemporary art literature as Australia's greatest sculptor. Throughout his career he produced some 1,300 pieces of sculpture and approximately 5,000 drawings.

== Biography ==
Klippel was born in Potts Point, Sydney on 19 June 1920. At the age of six, he made his first model ship after being taken on a ferry ride on Sydney Harbour. Model making became a passion. He was educated at Tudor House in 1933 and 1934 and then later at Sydney Grammar School. He trained to work in the wool industry but in 1939 he joined the Royal Australian Navy. He was employed to make models of planes while he was serving in the Defensively Equipped Merchant Ships at the Gunnery Instruction Centre during World War II.

While working at the centre he was able to attend evening classes in sculpture under Lyndon Dadswell at East Sydney Technical College and after his military discharge, was able to attend for a full year.

His parents' business was successful and with their support, he left Australia in 1947 to study at the Slade School of Fine Art where he remained for six months. He lived and painted at The Abbey Arts Centre in New Barnet, London, along with artists Leonard French, James Gleeson, Peter Benjamin Graham, Douglas Green, Stacha Halpern, Grahame King and Inge King. In November 1948, Klippel, Gleeson and the young Lucian Freud exhibited together in London. André Breton, the originator of Surrealism, arranged for Klippel's work to be exhibited in Paris the following year.

He spent a year in Paris where he attended lectures by Jiddu Krishnamurti. This strengthened a lifelong interest in Eastern religion and philosophy, Buddhism, Hinduism, and Zen. After 18 months in Paris, Klippel returned to Australia in 1950.

In 1957 he sailed to the United States, living in New York . He taught sculpture at the Minneapolis School of Art (now the Minneapolis College of Art and Design) from 1958 to 1962 and returned to New York until 1963. He then returned to Sydney, where he remained until his death. He taught at Alexander Mackie College of Advanced Education from 1975 to 1979.

In 1988 he was appointed an Officer of the Order of Australia for his services to art.

He died in Sydney on his 81st birthday, 19 June 2001.

== Work ==
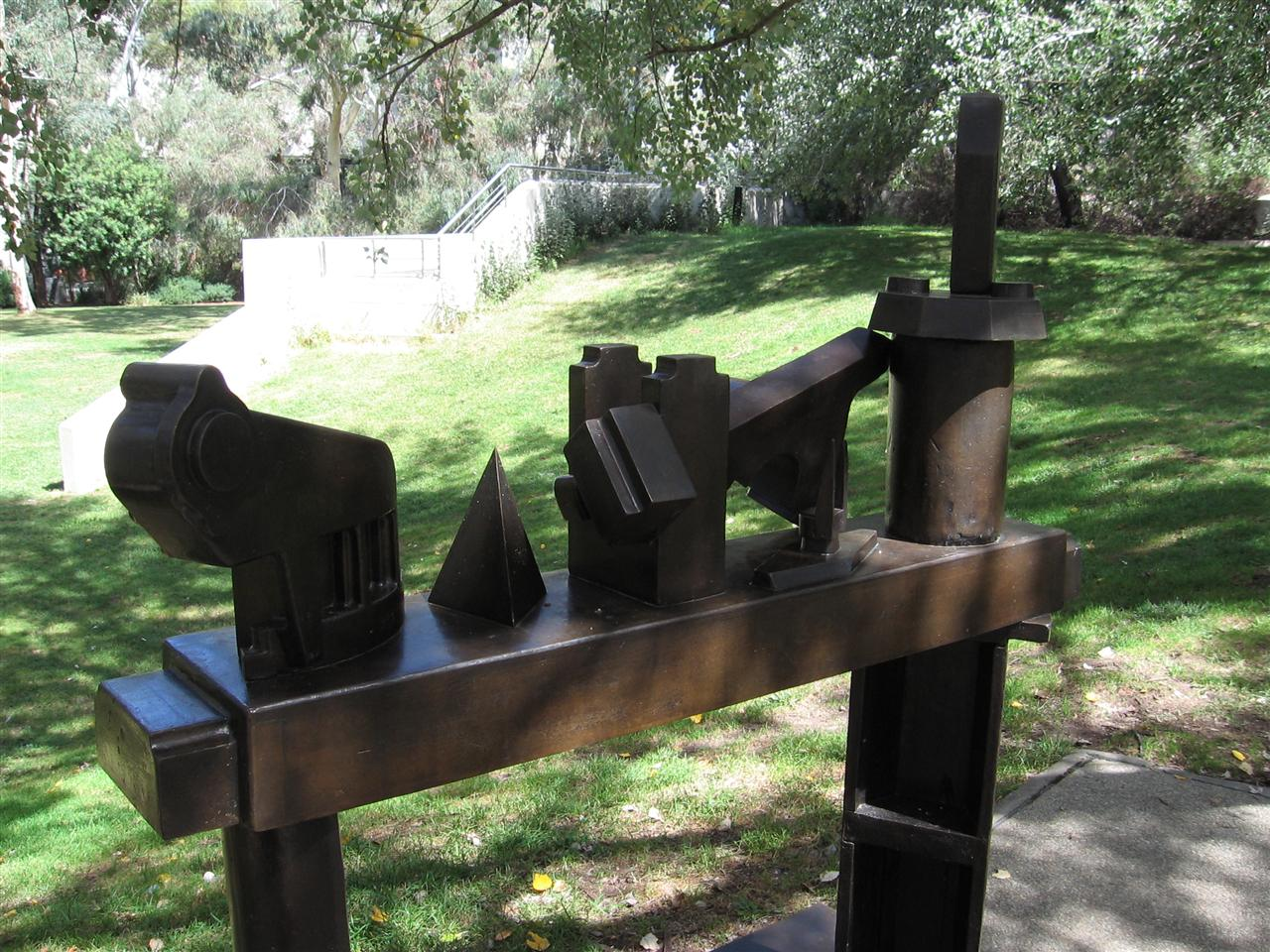
Number 751 by Robert Klippel at National Gallery of Australia.

Klippel's work commonly utilized an extraordinary diversity of junk materials: wood, stone, plastic toy kits, wooden pattern parts, typewriter machinery, industrial piping and machine parts, as well as bronze, silver, oils, photography, collage and paper. He is also notable for the great diversity of scale of his work, from intricate whimsical structures in metal to the large wooden assemblages of the 1980s. His mature work was usually untitled, being distinguished by simple number sequences.

While in London, he met other expatriate Australians including the surrealist painter James Gleeson. The two collaborated on several works, including Madame Sophie Sesostoris (1947–48), a Pre-Raphaelite satire, combining Klippel's sculpture with Gleeson's painting. For a time, Klippel embraced the surrealist ethic, exhibiting at a major surrealist show and meeting André Breton.

During his time in London, he began a series of drawings and filled his notebooks with analytical diagrams of organic and mechanical objects, everything from screws and cogs to insects and shells, and making detailed drawings of the anthropomorphic forms used by artists such as Henry Moore and Pablo Picasso. Whereas Moore had related the human figure to the forms of nature, Klippel set out to relate the forms of nature to the shapes and forms of machinery in an industrial society. He made the statement that he wished "to seek the inter-relationship between the cogwheel and the bud."

By the time Klippel returned to Sydney in 1950, he was committed to construction as a method and was producing totally abstract sculptures. His work was received with little enthusiasm in Australia at first, with his first sculptural work was not selling in his country until 1956. Forced to work full-time, his production dropped to a mere 18 pieces between 1950 and 1957.

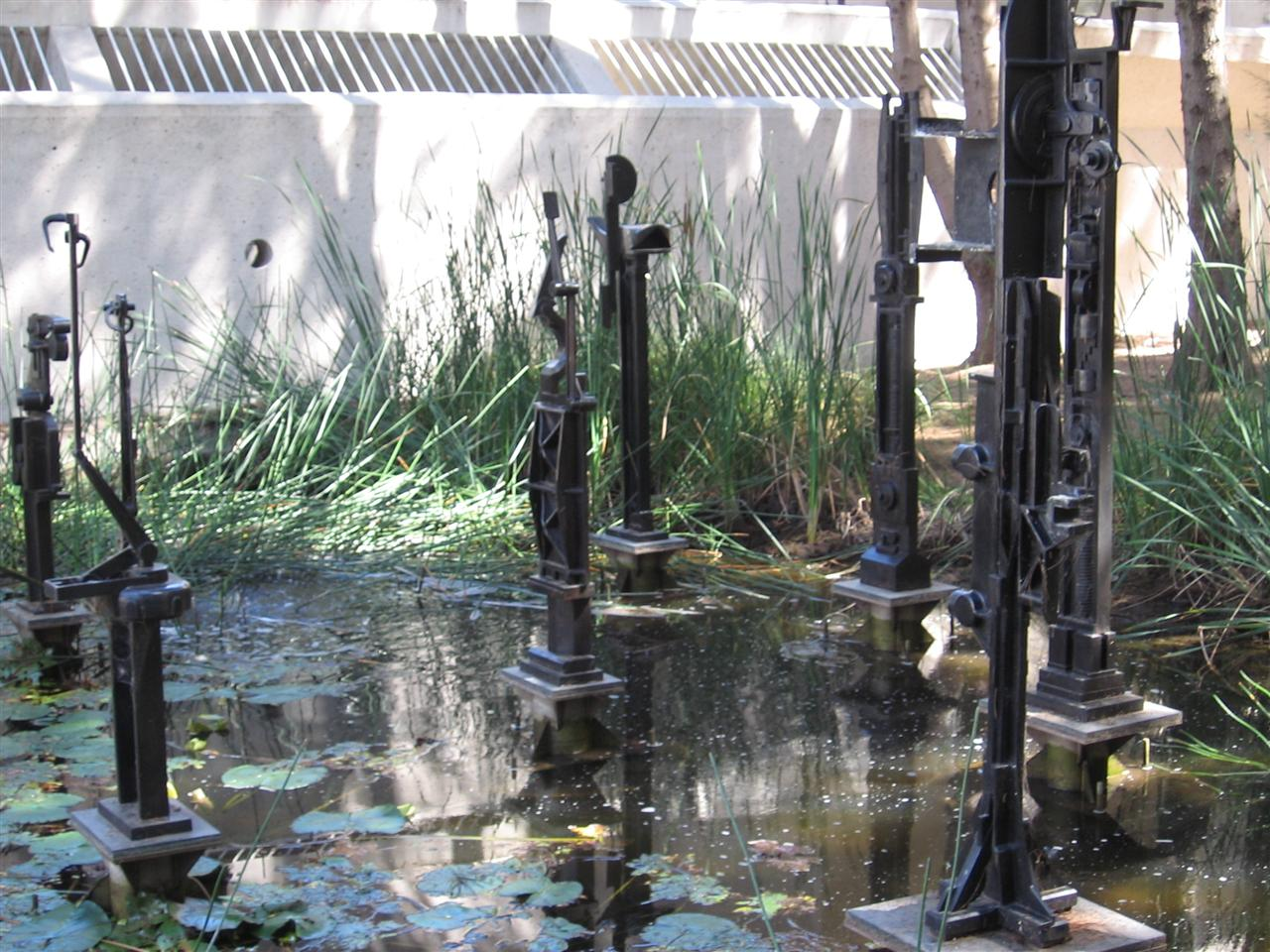
Klippel’s Group of eight bronzes (Opus 365b-372b) 1982/3, in the pond of the Summer Garden, National Gallery Australia.

By the 1950s Klippel had grown apart from the surrealists and in New York he was invigorated by the rise of abstract expressionism and the New York School. He moved away increasingly from traditional sculpture and produced his first junk assemblages in 1960. He began incorporating machine parts, pieces of wood and industrial piping into his works.

In 1964, art critic Robert Hughes called Klippel "one of the few Australian sculptors worthy of international attention". The statement cemented his international reputation, but he struggled to win acceptance in his own country. During the 1970s and '80s, when the traditional distinctions between sculpture and architecture, design, photography, performance and painting were frequently presented as obsolete, Klippel remained committed to the idea of sculpture as abstract, as occupying sculptural space, and as sustaining in ways beyond literary or narrative function.

Klippel's last decades were extremely prolific. In the 1980s he completed a major series of small bronzes, as well as a large number of monumental wooden assemblages, made from the pattern-parts of early twentieth century maritime machinery. Working with wood, metals, plastics, junk, machinery parts, oils, watercolours and paper, and utilising the techniques of casting, assemblage, painting and collage, he had completed over 1,200 sculptures by the end of the 1990s.

A documentary film, Make It New: A Portrait of the Sculptor Robert Klippel, was produced in 2003.
