= William Ohly =

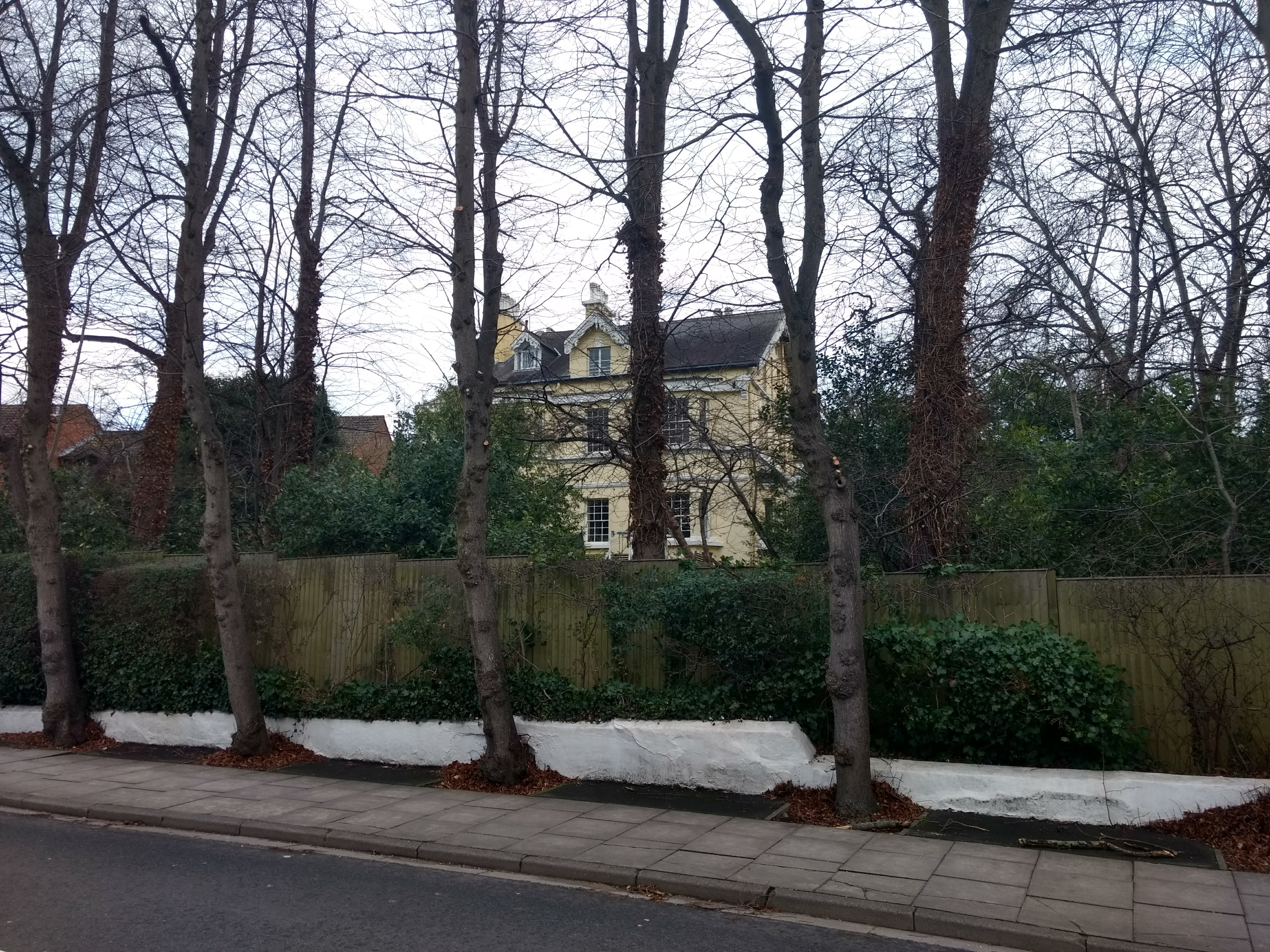
89 Park Road, New Barnet, former home of Ohly.

William Ohly (31 August 1883 – 22 July 1955) was a British ethnographic art collector and gallery owner, whose Berkeley Galleries and Abbey Art Centre and Museum were important features of the mid-20th century London art scene.

== Life ==
Ohly was born in 1883 in Kingston upon Hull before moving with his family to Frankfurt am Main when he was 14. Raised in Germany, Ohly attended the Städelschule and was subsequently apprenticed to the German sculptor Hugo Lederer in Berlin. Together with one of his brothers, Ohly worked in Germany until 1914 creating fountains and memorials. He briefly married and had a son, but the couple soon separated.

Ohly returned to Britain before World War I, but after the conflict went back to Germany again, eventually leaving in 1934 after the Nazis took power. He settled in New Barnet and purchased a large house and grounds from the religious sect, 'The Confraternity of the Kingdom of Christ', founded by J.S.M.Ward, converting them into a museum, gallery and artist commune, the Abbey Arts Centre, whose curator was Cottie Arthur Burland from 1950. He also owned a commercial gallery, the Berkeley Galleries in Davies Street, where he held numerous art and ethnography exhibitions. Ohly died in 1955, but the gallery remained open until 1977 under his son Ernest.
