= Inge King =

Australian sculptor (1915–2016)

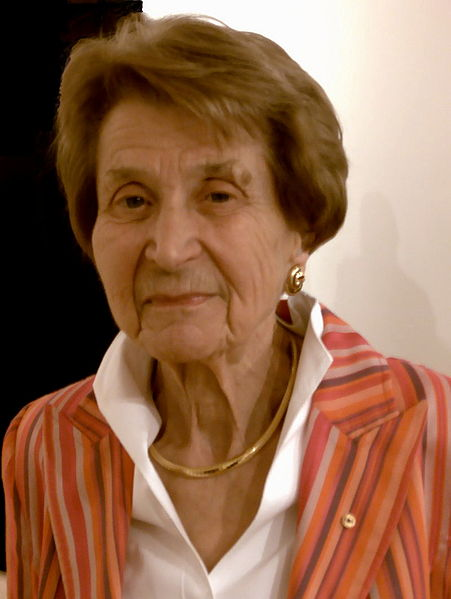
- Inge King (2008)
- Born: Ingeborg Viktoria Neufeld; 26 November 1915; Berlin, German Empire
- Died: 23 April 2016 (aged 100); Melbourne, Australia
- Education: Berlin Academy of Arts; Royal Academy of Arts, London; Glasgow School of Art
- Known for: Sculpture
- Notable work: Forward Surge (1972–1974), Melbourne Arts Centre.
- Movement: Centre 5
- Awards: Member of the Order of Australia (AM) 1984; Australian Arts Council Visual Arts Emeritus Award; The Dame Elisabeth Lifetime Achievement Award For Australian Sculpture 2015

Ingeborg Viktoria "Inge" King AM (née Neufeld; 26 November 1915 – 23 April 2016) was a German-born Australian sculptor. She received many significant public commissions. Her work is held in public and private collections. Her best known work is Forward Surge (1974) at the Melbourne Arts Centre. She became a Member of the Order of Australia in January 1984.

== Early years: Berlin to Melbourne ==
=== Berlin ===
Inge King (née Ingeborg Viktoria Neufeld) was born in Berlin on 26 November 1915, the youngest of four girls in a well-to-do Jewish family. Her early childhood was typical one for a child of her class and time in a European city. But after World War I, conditions in Germany became increasingly difficult. The period of the Weimar Republic (1918–1933), though a culturally stimulating time, was never stable. Conditions were made more difficult by the hyper-inflation of the early 1920s and the depression of 1929. During that time, things became increasingly difficult for the Neufeld family. By the time King's father died in 1930, when she was 14, the family had lost most of its money. Her older sisters supported her to stay at school until she finished, in 1932, which enabled her to get a good education. She would have liked to have gone on to university, possibly to study medicine, but, financially, that was out of the question.

King was 17 when Hitler came to power on 30 January 1933. Two of her older sisters, now married, decided to emigrate: one to Palestine, another to the US. By 1934, when she was 18, King was effectively on her own. She went to live with other young people in a small Zionist commune, where she worked in exchange for board and lodging. She said of this experience: "I owe them a lot ... This commune ... gave me or taught me some independence, which was invaluable", and, most importantly, taught her "to survive without money".

King was starting to think about being an artist, though this was really a second choice. But art was something she could do with minimal resources, so long as she could support herself. King was influenced both by mediaeval sculpture and by Expressionist sculpture, an important part of German avant-garde art, and particularly by the work of the wood-carver, Ernst Barlach (1870–1938). The Nazis considered such art to be decadent (Entartete Kunst) and later attempted to suppress it. King went to see the artist Käthe Kollwitz (1867–1945), whose work she admired. Kollwitz' advice to King about a career in art was "Don’t do it if you can help it. It is so difficult". Nevertheless, King did go on. She said: "I haven’t regretted it. I agree with her, it’s difficult."

King found a teacher, Hermann Nonnenmacher (1892–1988), a wood-carver influenced by Ernst Barlach, who taught her the basic skills of wood-carving and modelling in clay. King worked with him until she was accepted into the Berlin Academy of Fine Arts in 1937, when she was 21, one of only three non-Aryan students there (all women). She was forced to leave about a year later, not long before Kristallnacht (9–10 November 1938). While she was there, she supported herself by undertaking commercial work (such as carving architectural ornaments) for the sculptor, Otto Hitzberger (1878–1964), who was on the staff there.

King finally got out of Germany in 1939, with the help of German friends. One helped her get a visa for England. Another warned her that he had received his mobilisation papers and that she should leave as soon as possible. She spent about a year in domestic service with families in southern England. She found England far more old-fashioned and conservative than the Berlin she had come from. This was quite a shock.

=== London and Glasgow ===
She was accepted at the Royal Academy on the basis of the drawings she had brought with her and her time at the Berlin Academy. She spent two terms there, in 1940, before it was closed on account of the German bombing raids on London. She also went to evening classes in life drawing at the London Central School of Arts and Crafts until it moved to Northampton, where there were no facilities for sculpture. King then applied to the College of Art in Edinburgh, which accepted her, but Edinburgh was in a restricted area and King, as a foreign national, could not live there. They suggested she apply to the Glasgow School of Art.

Glasgow was a quite cosmopolitan place. There had been a Jewish community there for many years, which brought intellectual and cultural energy to the Glasgow society. The war brought migrants and refugees into Britain. As Glasgow was not a protected area, it was one of the places where they could live. This brought a substantial increase in the number of Jewish residents in the city, as well as the development of a Polish community.

The head of sculpture at the Glasgow School of Art was Benno Schotz (1891–1984). Born in Estonia of Jewish parents, he migrated to Glasgow as a young man and studied sculpture at night-classes while working for a shipbuilding company. Being foreign-born, Schotz was not liable to be called up for war work, so the sculpture department at the School of Art functioned throughout the war. He was an excellent teacher: "[He] had excellent rapport with his small group of students. Formal classes were held in the morning, then they had the studio to themselves for the rest of the day and into the evening. ... Schotz had the highly developed technical skills of a successful practising artist and was alive to the hands-on realities of making sculpture as much as he was to the compelling political and social ideas of the times." He also "supported refugees and worked throughout his life to bring their suffering to public notice. His home was a meeting place for artists, actors, writers, politicians and cultural leaders. He was an outstanding individual: energetic, intelligent humane and charming."

King entered the Glasgow School of Art in 1941. She spent three years there. She said of this time: "I was very happy in Glasgow. It was actually the only time I could just work the way I wanted to and I worked very hard." She "felt comfortable with [Schotz] with whom she shared a European background. He was an intelligent master who encouraged her to explore.... Years later King discovered that he had found her 'a very demanding student'".

A fellow student of Schotz's at Glasgow at this time was Margaret Priest, who later emigrated to Perth in Western Australia, where she became an important local sculptor. She was impressed by the cosmopolitan atmosphere and wider experience of the world brought to the Glasgow School by King and the other refugee students. She later recollected that: "There were assorted part-time students who came and went around the School of Art ... [King] was always free with advice and help and tools and materials so that they became absorbed in our group. We were an astonishing mixture of cultures and it did us the world of good. ... They all offered the same unstinting friendship and hospitality spiced with that wonderful Jewish humour. I wondered how they could all be so clever."

The artwork produced by the refugee students at the art school was quite different from that of the other students. They "were doing harsh and emotional art fuelled by bitterness and anger. They had long conversations about Käthe Kollwitz and swapped books and newspapers about politics and art in Europe. Picasso’s Guernica of 1937 and his other war-inspired painting and sculpture and the work of other European artists were now the subject of endless discussion." However, the cultural transition was not all one way. The Glasgow choirs sang Scottish folk songs and Afro-American spirituals: music that had been suppressed in Germany and was a revelation to refugees like King, who understood its relevance to the times.

In late 1942, Schotz organised an important exhibition of European Jewish art in Glasgow. Most of these works had been smuggled out of Europe. The exhibition included works by Camille Pissarro, Max Liebermann, Josef Herman, Jankel Adler, Chaïm Soutine, Ossip Zadkine, Ernst Barlach and Benno Schotz himself. The Glasgow Art Gallery acquired a bronze sculpture by Ossip Zadkine, the Music Group], for its collection. The Glasgow Herald described it as the "outstanding item" among the recent acquisitions, "the first really 'modern' piece of sculpture in the city’s permanent collection". King's later piece, Musicians: Homage to Zadkine (1947), was a response to this work.

Warsaw was another significant work by King from this period, a small sculpture whose inspiration comes from her response to the events in Europe. Having completed it, King knew that she would never make another work like it.

King finished her formal study in 1944. The next couple of years were difficult. She spent the time teaching in nursery schools, a job she liked but which she found demanding. She did not do any further work of her own until she returned to live in London.

=== Abbey Art Centre ===
Early in 1947, she went to live at the Abbey Art Centre, an artists' community located in New Barnet, Hertfordshire, near London. King was a fairly early resident there. Quite a number of Australian artists lived at the Abbey at various times. These included Robert Klippel, James Gleeson, Phillip Martin, Oliffe Richmond, Noel Counihan and Bernard Smith, who became an art historian. Grahame King, whom King later married, arrived later in 1947. King's early works at the Abbey were figurative, but not realistic. But it was during this period that King "made an arbitrary decision to move away from representational work". "I could not see how I could do any more with the figure, so I decided to move into what I call non-representational work. I don't like to call it abstraction as my work was not abstract in concept. I was groping for my own way." She had two exhibitions in London, then spent six months in Paris, which she enjoyed. In September 1949, she went to New York.

"[New York] was an incredible experience because, well, I really made a point of meeting people. I took some of my carvings with me and I exhibited them [in a gallery there]." People she met there included the sculptor Herbert Ferber, Mark Rothko and Barnett Newman. She saw her first Jackson Pollock show. She found the American painters inspiring because of their vitality. Also "in 1949-50, New York ... after war-torn Europe, it was sparkling, it was clean, it was very safe still." She went to see Walter Gropius at Harvard, who was interested in her work. He offered to facilitate a scholarship for her for the Institute of Design in Chicago.

Back in London, she and Grahame King decided to marry. As a German refugee, she could have emigrated to America, but Grahame, as an Australian, could not get a residency permit. She did not want to stay in Europe, and, after visiting New York, "equated Australia with the USA, as part of the bright new world where she could work in a lively and adventurous atmosphere and rear a family." The Kings left London for Melbourne early in 1951.

=== Melbourne ===
But Melbourne was not New York. King found it "almost Victorian". Her first impression of her adopted country was: "Rather flat, like a can of flat beer." But, she said, "I made up my mind I will not look back. You see, I had emigrated once, and the first emigration is the hardest to adjust to. I think people do not realise that. ... these experiences ... fundamentally it does something to your whole system." She was unable to make sculpture for several years. But she knew that she could not go back to Germany to live.

The Kings bought an acre of land on a bare hillside at Warrandyte, a small settlement in the Yarra valley, about 25 km north-east of Melbourne. In the early 1950s, it was a rural area, rather isolated, and lacking most of the services now taken for granted in suburban areas (such as roads, water, sewerage and electricity). The Kings asked the architect, Robin Boyd (cousin of the artist, Arthur Boyd), to design a house for them. Boyd designed a basic, one-roomed house, which could be extended in modules over time. They did much of the building work themselves. They moved into the house at Christmas, 1952. They had no electricity for the first six months and no hot-water system for three years and the house had tanks for water. They did not have a car for a couple of years. During this time, the Kings' two daughters, Joanna and Angela, were born. King later referred to their lifestyle at this time as 'suburban pioneering', though such pioneering was not uncommon in the outer suburbs of Melbourne at this time.

The trees have now grown up on the once bare hillside. The windows at the front of the house look over a garden where King's sculptures sit among the eucalypts and shrubs. Inside, the house is full of books and art works: small sculptures, paintings, prints, postcards, ceramics, aboriginal artefacts and bark paintings, cover every available surface. King said: "Robin Boyd used to come up here and say 'This house should look awful, but it doesn't.'"

King had to come to terms with her new country.

Building her own home and rearing children helped to bring a certain stability to King’s life after the unsettling experience of leaving two countries to live in a third. Here everything was so very different from the old world [that] it took time to mend the breaks, first with Germany where much she had valued was destroyed, and then with Britain where she had been welcomed and had received most of her formal education in sculpture.

The bush at Warrandyte looked strange to her when King first went there in 1951. But "Ten years later ... I started to adjust to this continent - and then it took another ten years to find my own style." But as King noted: "Had I gone on living in Europe, my work would have been very different."

== Work in Australia ==
Inge King was at the forefront of the development of non-figurative sculpture in Australia. She was a founding member of the Centre 5 group of sculptors. This group grew from a meeting convened by Julius Kane in Melbourne in 1961 to "help foster greater public awareness of contemporary sculpture in Australia". Members of the group included Julius Kane, Lenton Parr, Inge King, Vincas Jomantas, Clifford Last, Teisutis Zikaras and Norma Redpath.

Many of King's large-scale works are found in public spaces and on university campuses. She had more than 26 solo exhibitions and participated in more than 60 group exhibitions in Australia and New Zealand and also in London and New York. She had a retrospective exhibition at the National Gallery of Victoria in 1992 and a joint exhibition with her husband, the print-maker Grahame King, at McClelland Gallery in 2004. Another retrospective exhibition including the work of Grahame King (who died in 2008) was held at the National Gallery of Victoria in 2014.

== Recognition, honours and awards ==
- 1984: Member of the Order of Australia, For service to the visual arts, particularly sculpture
- 2009: Australian Arts Council Visual Arts Emeritus Award, in recognition of her central role in raising the profile of modern sculpture in Australia
- 2010: A Thousand Different Angles, a Frontyard Films documentary on Inge King and her sculpture, by Amanda King and Fabio Cavadini was screened on the ABC1 programme Artscape. A five-minute extract is available online from the National Film and Sound Archive.
- 2015: The Dame Elisabeth Lifetime Achievement Award For Australian Sculpture
- 2016: Victorian Honour Roll of Women

== Major works ==
Inge King
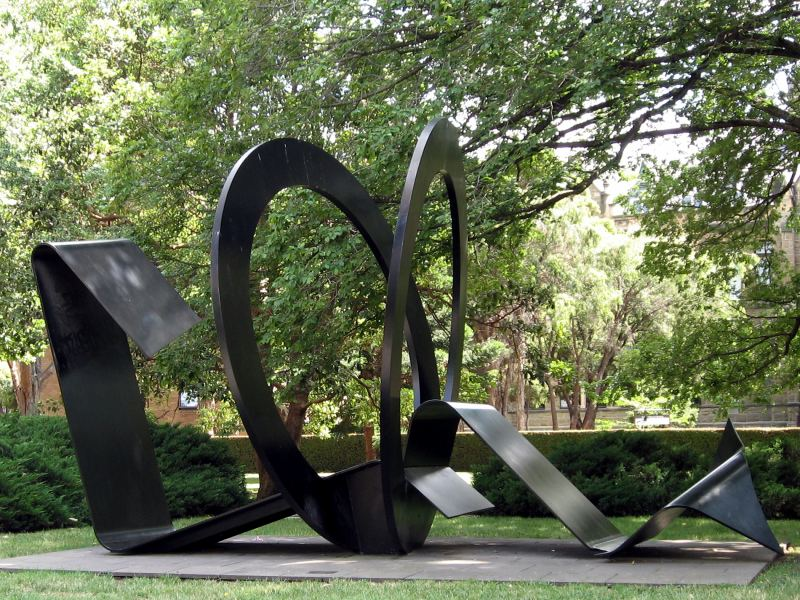
- Sun Ribbon
- Artist: Inge King
- Year: 1980–1982
- Medium: Sculpture
- Subject: Painted steel
- Location: 37°47′49.51″S 144°57′43.4″E
- Owner: University of Melbourne

Inge King
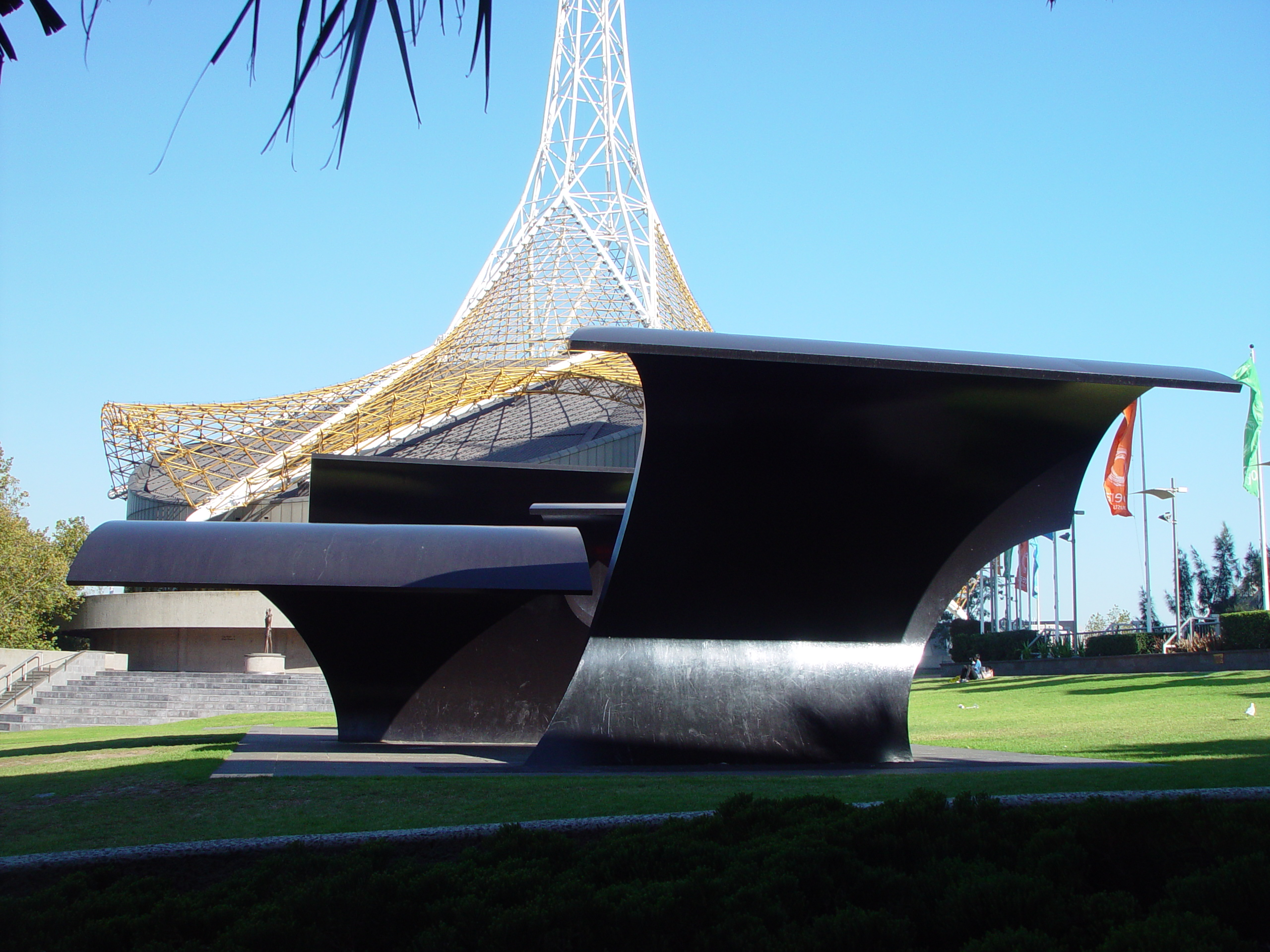
- Forward Surge
- Artist: Inge King
- Year: 1972
- Type: Sculpture
- Medium: Painted steel
- Location: Melbourne Arts Centre, St Kilda Road.

=== Royal Australian Air Force Memorial ===
The Royal Australian Air Force Memorial, situated on Anzac Parade, Canberra, was King's first significant public commission, gained as the result of a competition. The memorial had to symbolise the aspirations and the achievements of the RAAF, as embodied in the Air Force motto: Per Ardua ad Astra (through adversity to the stars). It was installed in 1973. The structure consists of three stainless steel panels, reminiscent of aircraft wings, the tallest nearly 8 metres high, which are separate but related to each other. In the centre is a bronze structure standing on a plinth. A plaque mounted on the plinth explains that the "three upsurging wing shapes in ground stainless steel represent endurance, strength and courage, while the bronze flight image embodies man's struggle to conquer the elements". see images

=== Sun Ribbon ===
This work was installed in 1980, on a small lawn outside the Union Building at the heart of the University of Melbourne. It is formed from 19mm steel, and consists of two upright steel circles, each 360 cm in diameter, and three folded metal planes; the total length is 6 metres. It provides the students with a unique resting place among its massive unfurling bands and is the focal point of one of the university's busiest outdoor spaces, the Union Lawn. see more images

=== Forward Surge ===
Inge Kings's best known sculpture is the monumental Forward Surge at the Melbourne Arts Centre. The sculpture was commissioned by the Victorian Arts Centre in 1974. Construction was completed in 1976, and the work was installed in its present position in 1981. It is made from 50mm mild steel and stands 5.2m high, 15.1m wide and 13.7m deep.see more images

Forward Surge is the major sculptural drawcard for the Arts Centre precinct and one of our most prominent and valued works of art. It has been listed on the National Trust Register since 1992, and is noted by the National Trust as King's "most monumental work of art, and probably most significant"

=== Shearwater ===
This sculpture was commissioned by Esso Australia for a site outside its building on the south bank of the Yarra River in Melbourne. It was installed in 1995. The sculpture is built in polychrome steel. Its dimensions are 780 cm by 670 cm by 350 cm. See images

Inge King
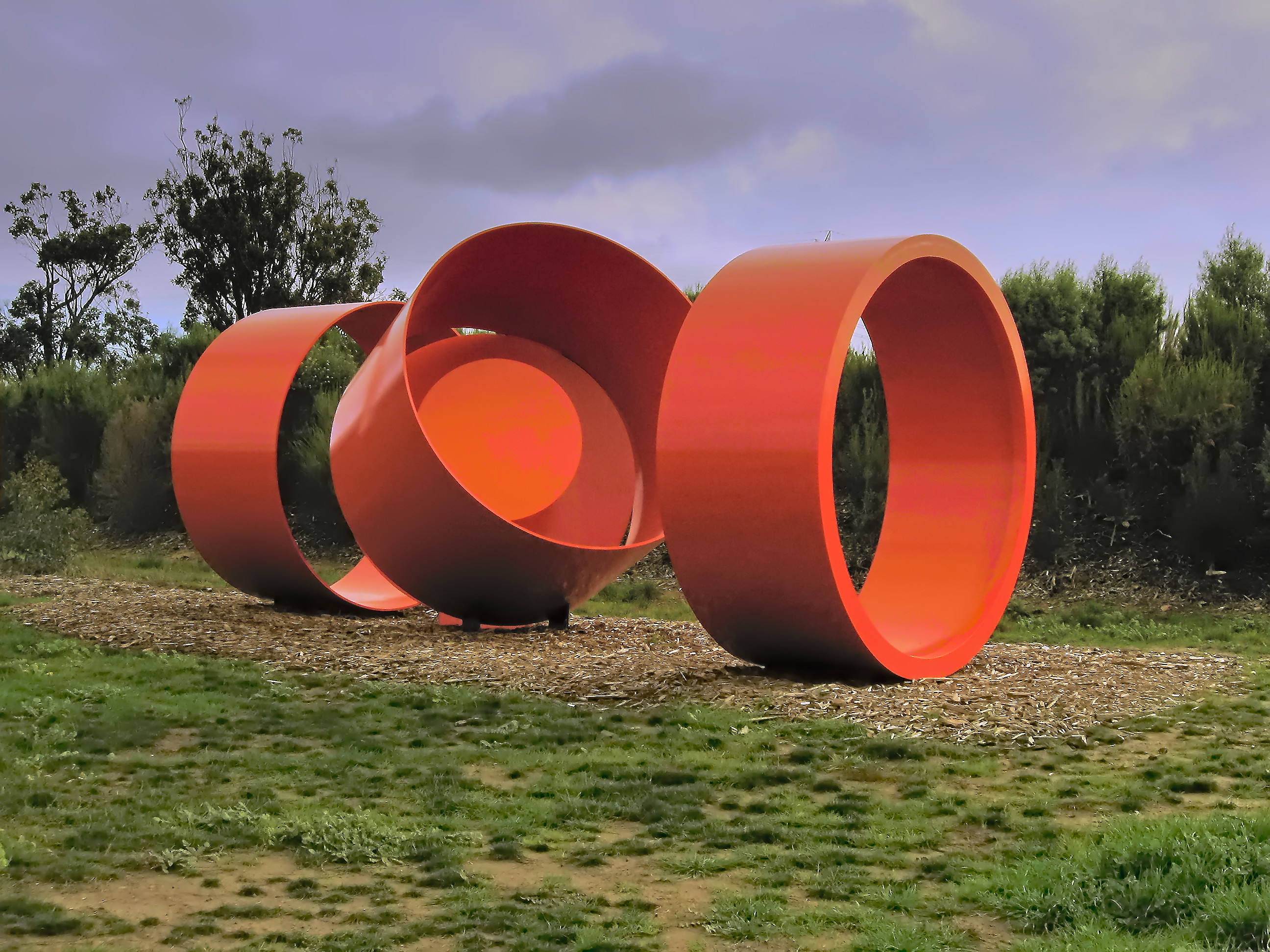
- Red Rings
- Artist: Inge King
- Year: 2008
- Medium: Sculpture
- Subject: Stainless steel
- Location: junction of the EastLink Trail and the Dandenong Creek Trail; 37°53′58.24″S 145°12′50.25″E
- Owner: ConnectEast

Inge King
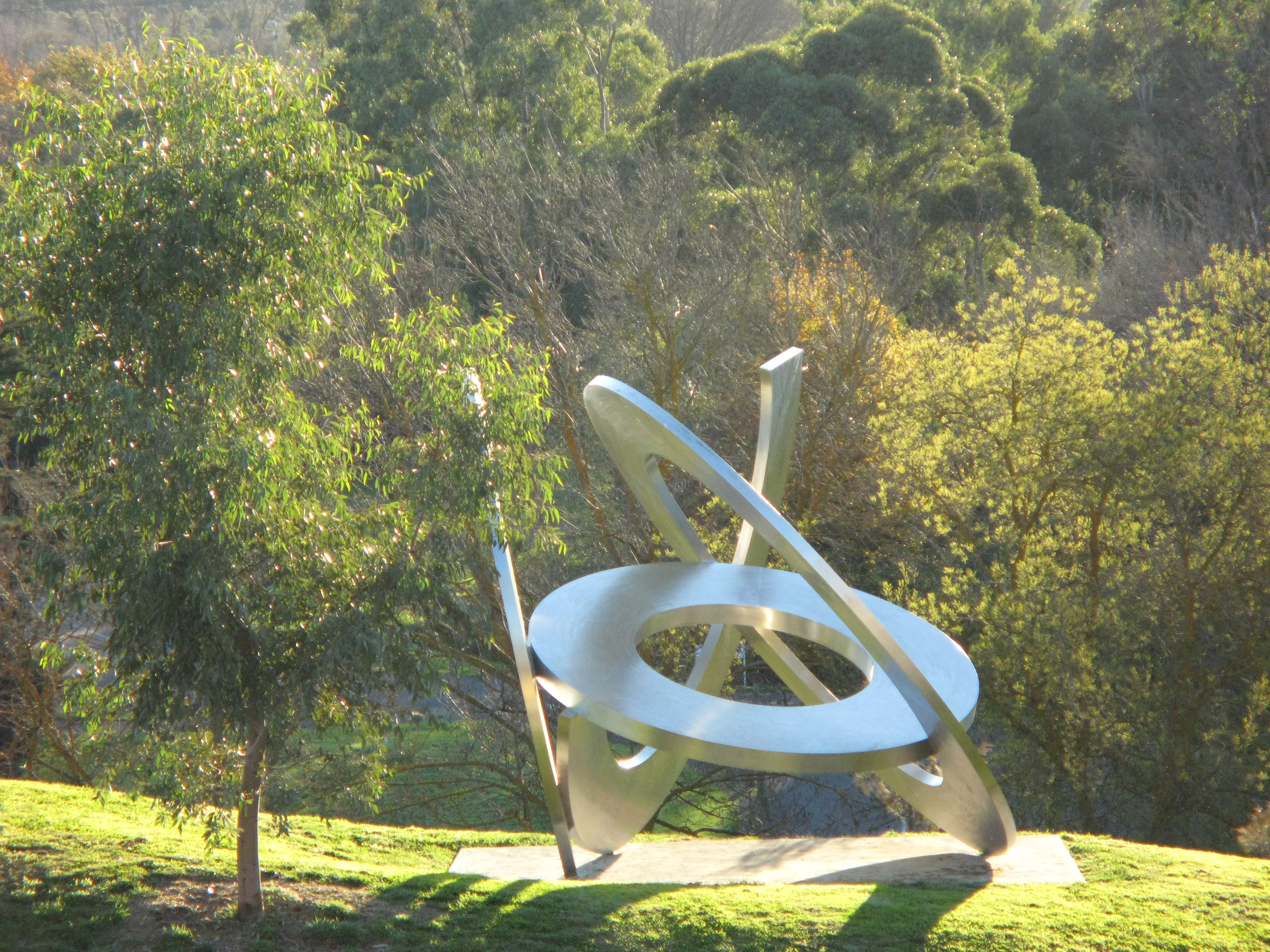
- Rings of Saturn
- Artist: Inge King
- Year: 2006
- Medium: Sculpture
- Subject: Stainless steel
- Location: Heidelberg, Victoria; 37°45.519′S 145°4.974′E
- Owner: Heide Museum of Modern Art

=== Red Rings ===
This sculpture was commissioned in 2008 by ConnectEast as part of the EastLink collection. It is located at the junction of the EastLink Trail and the Dandenong Creek Trail, near the EastLink Motorway, Melbourne. It is made up of three steel rings, each 2.5 metres in diameter and painted red. It is intended that people can walk through the sculpture. see more images

=== Rings of Saturn ===
Rings of Saturn is located in the Sir Rupert Hamer Garden, in the grounds of the Heide Museum of Modern Art in Bulleen, a suburb of Melbourne. Shortly after the dedication of this work, in August 2006, King said:

Working with Heide Museum for Rings of Saturn, firstly we agreed on a maquette. Then when I saw the site I knew I had to enlarge the work to do what I call 'conquer the landscape'. The Australian landscape is an enormously powerful landscape; vast and with clarity of atmosphere, and you never know in advance how work will look in it. The landscape grips my imagination – I try to measure my work against the vast spaces of this country. Conquering the landscape does not rely on scale but simplicity and clarity of form expressing inner strength and tension. If my sculpture is outdoors or in the public domain I like it to arouse people's curiosity to explore the work. Multidimensional objects look different from every angle. The exciting thing about outdoor sculpture is the change with the light, the weather... everything is in constant flux. It becomes almost a living entity.

see more images

== Other works ==
- Flower Dancer (1948), National Gallery of Victoria, Melbourne
- Oracle (1966)
- Encounter (1968), La Trobe University, Melbourne-Bundoora
- Fred Schonell Memorial Fountain (1971), University of Queensland, Brisbane
- Black Sun (1975), National Gallery of Victoria, Melbourne
- Dialogue of Circles (1976), La Trobe University Sculpture Park, Melbourne-Bundoora
- Temple Gate (1976/1977), Sculpture park in the National Gallery of Australia, Canberra
- Lunar Image (1980), Museum and Art Gallery of the Northern Territory (MAGNT), Darwin, Northern Territory
- Jabaroo (1984/1985), McClelland Gallery and Sculpture Park, Langwarrin, Victoria
- Silent Gong (1989)
- Island Sculpture (1991), McClelland Gallery and Sculpture Park, Langwarrin, Victoria
- Guardian Angel (1995), Deakin Museum of Art, Deakin University, Melbourne
- Nayads (1997), Monash Gallery of Art (on loan from National Gallery of Victoria), Melbourne
- Moonbird (1999 commissioned by the Australia Fund), Residence of the Prime-minister, The Lodge, Canberra
- The Sentinel (2000), Eastern Freeway in Melbourne
- Wandering Angel (2000), The National Gallery of Australia, Canberra
- Rings of Jupiter (3) (2006), National Gallery of Victoria, Melbourne
- Red Rings (2008), Eastlink Motorway in Melbourne

== See also ==
- List of centenarians (artists)
- List of German women artists
