= Ohly =

Ohly (Swedish pronunciation: [ˈǒːlʏ]) is a surname. Notable people with the surname include:

- Lars Ohly (born 1957), Swedish politician
- William Ohly (1883–1955), British ethnographic art collector and gallery owner
