= Hermann Nonnenmacher =

German-British sculptor

- Born: 3 June 1892; Coburg, Germany
- Died: August 1988 (aged 96); London, UK
- Education: Dresden Academy of Fine Arts
- Known for: Sculpture
- Notable work: Abschied (1928), Berlinische Galerie
- Movement: Modernist
- Awards: German Federal Cross of Merit 1982

Hermann Nonnenmacher (1892–1988) was a sculptor, painter and teacher, born in Coburg, Germany, who later lived in London.

== Biography ==
Nonnenmacher served in the German Army during World War I and sustained some hearing loss. He studied at the Dresden Academy of Fine Arts, and was a member of the Association of German Artists.

In 1919 he married the sculptor Erna Rosenberg (1889-1980). They lived and worked in Berlin at Potsdamer Str. 29, the former studio of Lyonel Feininger.

Before the rise of Nazism, Nonnenmacher was a well-known sculptor whose works adorned many public buildings in Germany. The prominent Berlin-born Australian sculptor, Inge King studied under Nonnenmacher during 1936-1937 in preparation for her entry to the Berlin Academy of Arts. Hermann and Erna's sculptures was classified as Degenerate art by the Nazis, and much of their public works were destroyed. Erna was persecuted as a Jew and they emigrated to London in 1938.

During World War II Hermann and Erna were interned on the Isle of Man, where Hermann continued to make and exhibit artwork. After the war they set up a studio in a house off Archway Road, London.

From 1949 to 1970 Nonnenmacher taught modelling and pottery at Morley College. In 1982 Hermann Nonnenmacher was awarded the German Federal Cross of Merit by the West German government.

Nonnenmacher died in London in August 1988.

== Exhibitions and commissions ==
=== Public collections ===
- Nonnenmacher's 1928 sculpture "Abschied" (Farewell) is on display in the Berlinische Galerie Berlin.

=== Solo and two-person exhibitions ===
- Geffrye Museum
- Heal's Mansard Gallery
- Barclay Gallery, London (1953) Terra Cotta and Pottery Figurines by Audrey Blackman. Wood carvings by H. Nonnenmacher
- King's College, London (1973) Retrospective exhibition Hermann Nonnenmacher sculptures and drawings

=== Group exhibitions ===
- Royal Glasgow Institute of the Fine Arts Annual Exhibition, six times during 1940-1954
- Lambeth Palace great hall, Modern Church Art (1951). Nonnenmacher exhibited a statue of Job.
- Royal Academy of Arts, London
- Leicester Galleries, London
- Royal British Society of Sculptors
- Camden Arts Centre Art in Exile in Great Britain 1933-45 (1968)

=== Commissions ===
Nonnenmacher was awarded several commissions for public sculpture in Germany before the rise of Nazism. Most or all of this work was destroyed. Public commissions in England included sculpture for:

- Church of St. John, Waterloo, London
- Boulton & Paul Ltd, Norwich
- Merton College, Oxford
- Chapel of King's College London, two carved wooden sculptures
