= Man, Myth & Magic (encyclopedia) =

Encyclopedia on the supernatural

First edition cover. Painting by Austin Osman Spare

Man, Myth & Magic: An Illustrated Encyclopedia of the Supernatural is an encyclopedia of the supernatural, including magic, mythology and religion. It was edited by Richard Cavendish. The art director was Brian Innes, former percussionist of the band the Temperance Seven.

== Publication history ==
Man, Myth & Magic was originally published by BPC Publishing as a partwork, a limited British weekly magazine intended to be collected as a whole. The printer was Purnell and Sons, Leeds. Publication commenced in 1970, and continued for 112 issues spanning 1,000 articles with some 5,000 illustrations, many of them in full colour. Purnell also sold binders for gathering the installments into seven volumes, plus one additional binder for the magazine covers.

In 1970 BPC Publishing put out a very popular hardcover set condensing all 112 magazines into a 24 volume set. It was reprinted as a 21 volume revised edition by Marshall Cavendish in 1995 (ISBN 9781854357311). The material has been sold to Cavendish Square Publishing, which has published ten volumes of the material reorganized into books according to subject, including Witches and Witchcraft as well as Beliefs, Rituals, and Symbols of Ancient Greece and Rome. Cavendish Square revised the encyclopaedia into a five volume library bound set, in 2014.

== Editorial board ==
More than two hundred academics and specialists contributed to the magazine, and wrote in a generally accessible style. They consisted of:

- Glyn Daniel, archaeologist and editor of Antiquity.
- E. R. Dodds, former Regius Professor of Greek at Oxford.
- Mircea Eliade, professor of the History of Religion at University of Chicago.
- William Sargant, past Physician in Charge of the Department of Psychological Medicine, St. Thomas' Hospital.
- John Symonds, author and literary executor of Aleister Crowley.
- R. J. Zwi Werblowsky, professor of Comparative Religion, Dean of Faculty of Humanities, Hebrew University, Jerusalem.
- Robert Charles Zaehner, Spalding Professor of Eastern Religion and Ethics, Oxford.
- Cottie Arthur Burland, formerly of the Department of Ethnography at the British Museum.
