= Cottie Arthur Burland =

British writer and researcher (1905–1983)

Cottie Arthur Burland (September 17, 1905 – 1983) was a British writer and researcher. He studied at the Regent Street Polytechnic, graduated from the University of Westminster, and spent much of his forty-year career spanning from 1925 to 1965, in the Department of Ethnography at the British Museum in London. In 1950 he became honorary curator for the Abbey Art Centre Museum in Hertfordshire. He briefly served in the Royal Air Force during World War II.

== Writing ==
Burland's writing career covered such topics as art, mythology, ancient religions and primitive people and cultures, specifically the ancient Americas. He authored more than forty books and contributed to many others. During his long career Burland was a contributor to many publications, including the journal Natural History. He was on the editorial board of Man, Myth & Magic: An Illustrated Encyclopedia of the Supernatural which had contributions by over 200 academics and specialists and also served as art critic for Arts Review. Burland was a fellow of the Royal Anthropological Institute as well as a member of the British Society of Aesthetics, the Folk-Lore Society of London, and Societe de Americanistes de Paris.

Burland's first work was Gods of Mexico (1948), a hitherto unexplored subject for which he researched pre-Columbian religious manuscripts. He authored several works on Native American culture including North American Indian Mythology, published in 1966, Peoples of the Sun: The Civilizations of Pre-Columbian America, published a decade later, and The Incas, published in 1979.

Burland is also noted for his research into the occult as related to mythology and magical practices. His first work on magic was Magic Books from Mexico, published in 1953 which explored occult practices as well as animism, astrology, and witchcraft. Other books authored by him on the subject of magic include The Magical Arts: A Short History (1966), Secrets of the Occult (1972), and Beyond Science: A Journey into the Supernatural (1973).

Among Burland's other works are The Arts of the Alchemists (1967), which discusses the history of alchemy and several books on art, such as The Art of Primitive Peoples (1953), The Exotic White Man: An Alien in Asian and African Art (1969), which explores primitive art, and Eskimo Art (1973).

== Awards ==
In 1965 Burland was awarded the Imago Mundi Award for his work and research.
