= Abbey Museum of Art and Archaeology =

Australian public museum

Coordinates: 27.0709°S 153.0228°E

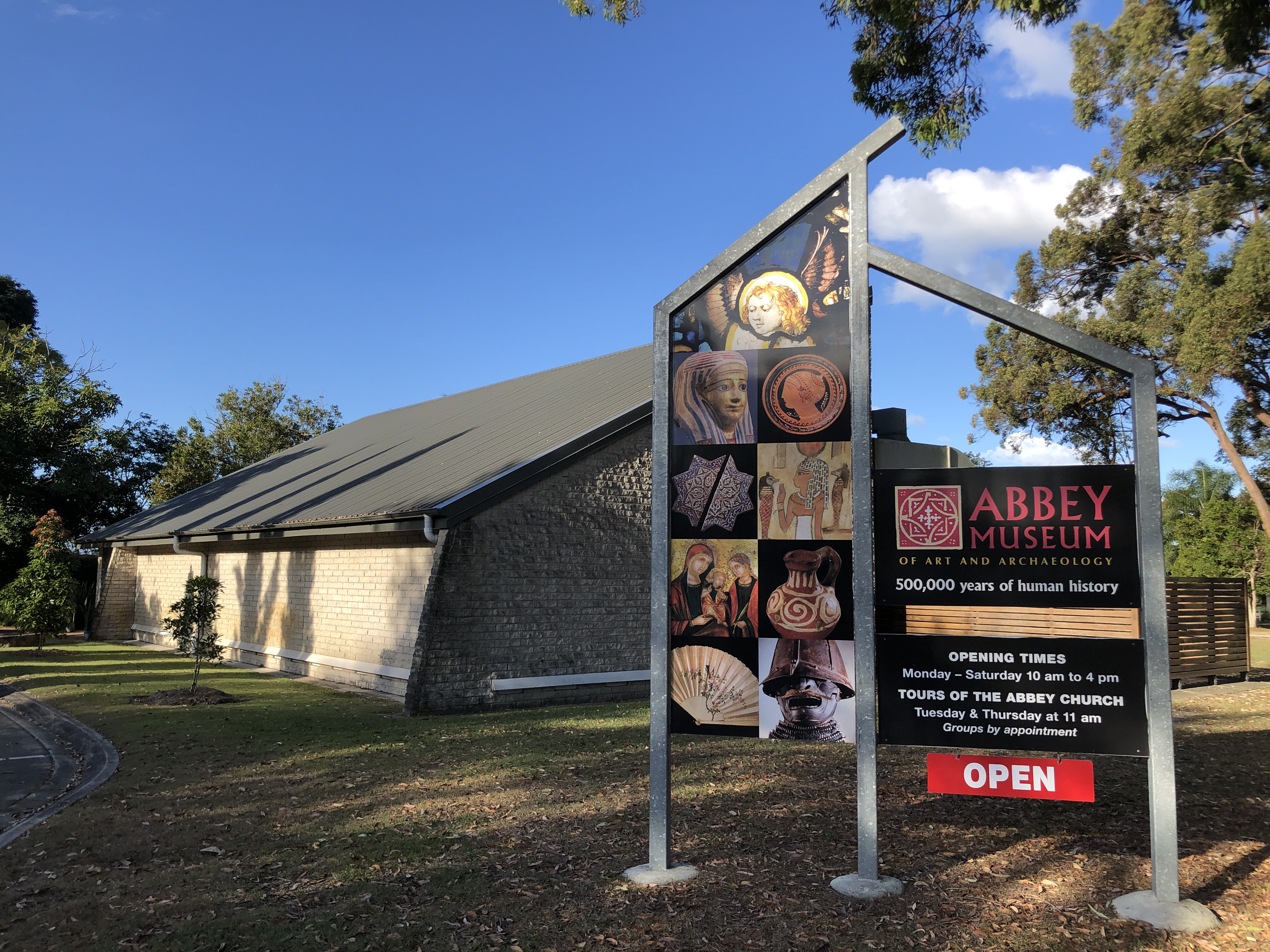

The Abbey Museum of Art and Archaeology, is an Australian public museum dedicated to the preservation and display of antiquities, fine art, archaeology and cultural heritage. Situated in Caboolture, Queensland, it opened in 1986. Displaying a unique collection of tools, weapons, pottery, ornaments, furniture and other artefacts, the Abbey collection spans through prehistoric hunters; the age of bronze and gold; great civilisations of Egypt, Mesopotamia and Greece; the Roman Empire; medieval knights, plagues and illuminated manuscripts; Renaissance Europe; and art from India and the Far East. The museum is the heir to the collections of the Abbey Folk Park (1934–1945) at Park Road, New Barnet; Great Britain's first open-air Folk Museum, and has been recognised as a nationally significant heritage collection.

== Historical background ==
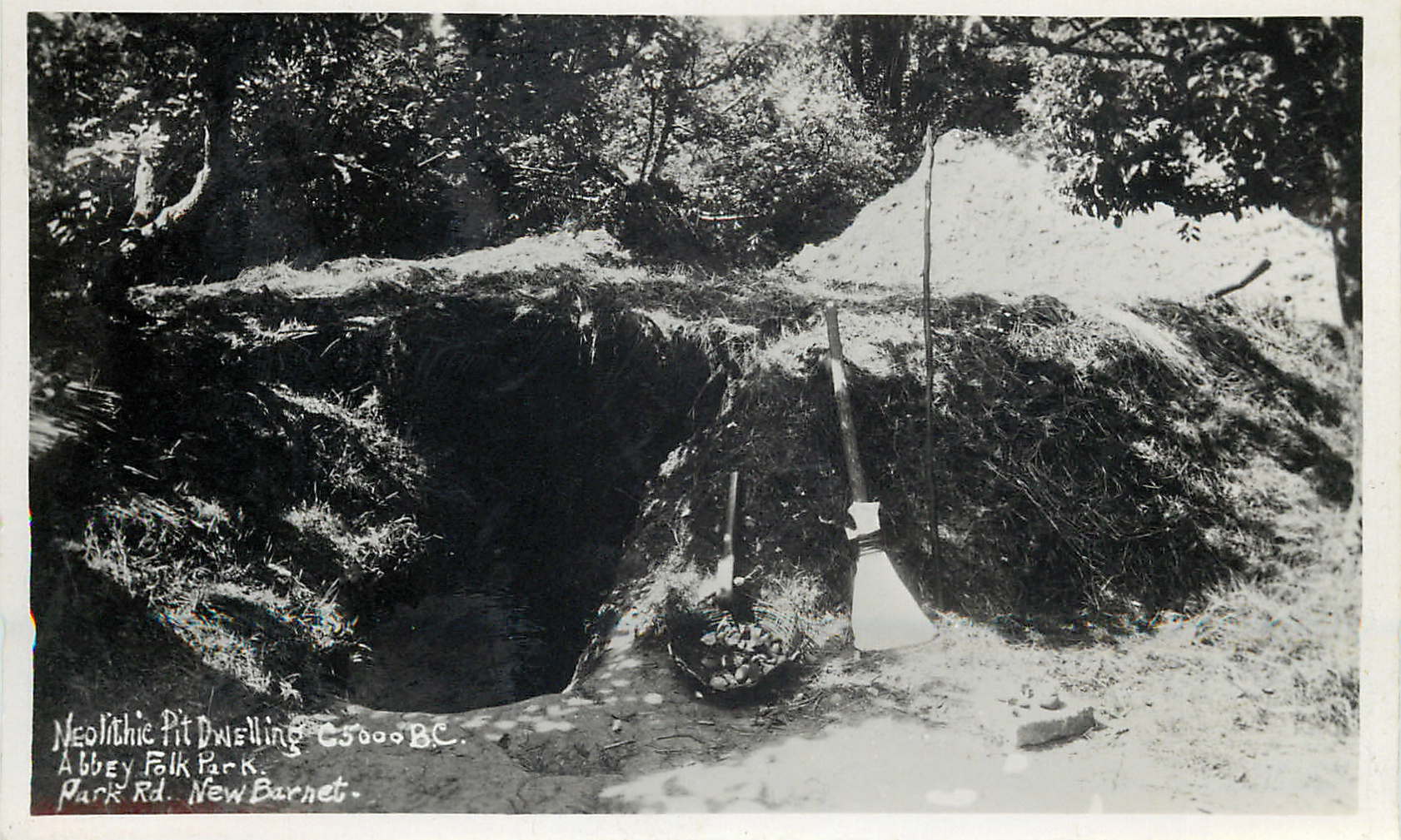
Replica Neolithic pit dwelling at Abbey Folk Park

The museum has its roots in the Abbey Folk Park which was established by Rev. John S.M. Ward (1885–1949) at Barnet, north of London, in 1934. Antiquarian, author, educator, mystic and spiritualist, Ward's museum was for its time, as unconventional as its founder. Rejecting the traditional model of the museum and influenced by the Skansen Folk Museum in Sweden, Ward opted to display artefacts in sympathetic surroundings. Dubbed by the press "The man who collects houses" Ward saved several historical buildings from destruction and had them rebuilt on the site at New Barnet, which was also home to the Confraternity of the Kingdom of Christ, a religious community that he founded in 1929. To display his substantial collection of prehistoric artefacts Ward constructed a replica Bronze Age village, becoming in the process a pioneer of experimental archaeology and 'open air' museums.

When it was forced to close in 1940 at the height of the London Blitz, the Abbey Folk Park housed 30 relocated historic buildings, replicas of ancient structures and a collection of more than 40,000 artefacts. In 1945 the museum buildings and the bulk of the collections were reluctantly sold to finance the migration of Ward and many members of his community to Cyprus where he died in 1949. The escalation of violence as the predominant Greek population sought Enosis, Union with Greece, from the British, forced the community to relocate again, arriving in Australia in 1956 and eventually settling in Caboolture, Queensland, in 1965.

In 1978 it was decided to make the remaining collection available to the public and a museum board was formed appointing Michael Strong (M.A. Archaeology & Heritage) as director of the Abbey Museum of Art and Archaeology. With the securing of government assistance and public sector donations and with the technical assistance from a number of institutions the construction of the new museum was started in 1983. In June 1986 the Abbey Museum of Art and Archaeology was officially opened in its present building. In 1999 the next stage of the museum, a manuscript gallery was opened, named in honour of Professor Richard Stephens who served as board chairman from 1993 to 2003.

On 13 February 2026, multiple ancient Egyptian artefacts were stolen from the museum following an early morning break in. Most of the artefacts, except for a wooden sculpture of a cat, were recovered the next day in a car at a ferry terminal, while a 52-year-old male suspect was arrested.

== Collections ==
The scope and range of the Abbey collections makes it unique amongst Australian museums, spanning 500,000 years of human history across numerous cultures and civilisations ranging from Palaeolithic stone tools to Renaissance paintings. The nearby Abbey Church houses a significant collection of stained glass dating from the Middle Ages through to the Arts and Crafts Movement.

Highlights of the collection include an ancient Egyptian death mask, Medieval and Renaissance stained glass, Italian and Flemish Old Master paintings from the 14th to the 18th centuries, Greek, Turkish and Russian icons, pottery, weapons and cult objects from the Bronze and Iron Ages, Roman glassware, a 17th-century Mughal Qur'an, samurai armour and weapons, medieval manuscripts.

The Museum carries on an active research program in consultation with international scholars and museums such as the British Museum, the Middlealdercentert in Denmark and others.

== Governance and philosophy ==
The museum defines itself as a "public museum of international standard" with a commitment to "telling the human evolutionary story impartially without bias of politics, religion or gender". It is administered by the Abbey Museum Association through a Board of Management which appoints a director and CEO.
