= Richard Cavendish (occult writer) =

British historian and writer

Richard Cavendish (12 August 1930 – 21 October 2016) was a British historian who was considered Britain's foremost authority on the subjects of occultism, religion, cartomancy, and mythology.

== Personal life ==
Cavendish was born in 1930 at Henley-on-Thames, Oxfordshire, the son of a Church of England clergyman. He lived with his partner in the United States for eight years, in New York City and Los Angeles. His daughter is the journalist and life peer Camilla Cavendish.

== Career ==
Cavendish was educated at Christ's Hospital and at Brasenose College, Oxford, where he specialized in medieval studies. He wrote both on the political and social history of Great Britain and on the history of folk magic and occultism in the British Isles and Europe. Among his best-known works are The Black Arts: A Concise History of Witchcraft, Demonology, Astrology, and Other Mystical Practices Throughout the Ages; The Tarot; A History of Magic; and the 24-volume set Man, Myth & Magic, which he both edited and contributed to. He also wrote regularly for the British journal History Today.

The Daily Telegraph said that Cavendish was considered "an authority on magic, myth, and witchcraft" and that his work was highly regarded for its depth of research and agnostic stance towards its sometimes controversial subject matter. Some of his books like The Black Arts: A Concise History of Witchcraft, Demonology, Astrology, and Other Mystical Practices Throughout the Ages and The Powers of Evil in Western Religion, Magic and Folk Belief were written for a lay audience rather than for scholars, and had become bestsellers with The Black Arts passing its 40th edition. In his 2016 obituary, The Times described him as: "Gregarious author and historian who became Britain's foremost authority on the occult while steadfastly refusing to dabble himself."

== Works ==
- The Black Arts: A Concise History of Witchcraft, Demonology, Astrology, and Other Mystical Practices Throughout the Ages, 1967
- Encyclopaedia of the Unexplained: Magic, Occultism and Parapsychology, 1974.
- Explore Britain's Coastline, AA Explore Britain Guides
- The Great Religions
- A History of Magic
- Images of Britain, W.H. Smith Exclusive Books
- King Arthur and the Grail: The Arthurian Legends and Their Meaning
- Kings & Queens: The Story of Britain's Monarchs From Earliest Times
- Legends of the World
- The Magical Arts, Arkana
- Man, Myth & Magic: An Illustrated Encyclopedia of the Supernatural, 1970–1972 (24 volumes)
- Mysteries of the Universe
- Mythology: An Illustrated Encyclopedia, 1980
- 100 Great Wonders of the World
- 1001 Historic Sites You Must See Before You Die
- The Powers of Evil in Western Religion, Magic and Folk Belief, Routledge and Kegan Paul, London, 1975 ISBN 0-7100-8117-0
- Prehistoric England
- The Tarot, London: Chancellor Press, 1975
- Visions of Heaven and Hell
- Wonders of the World
- The World of Ghosts and the Supernatural, 1994
