= Abbey Arts Centre =

Art centre in New Barnet, London

Coordinates: 51.6508°N 0.1611°W

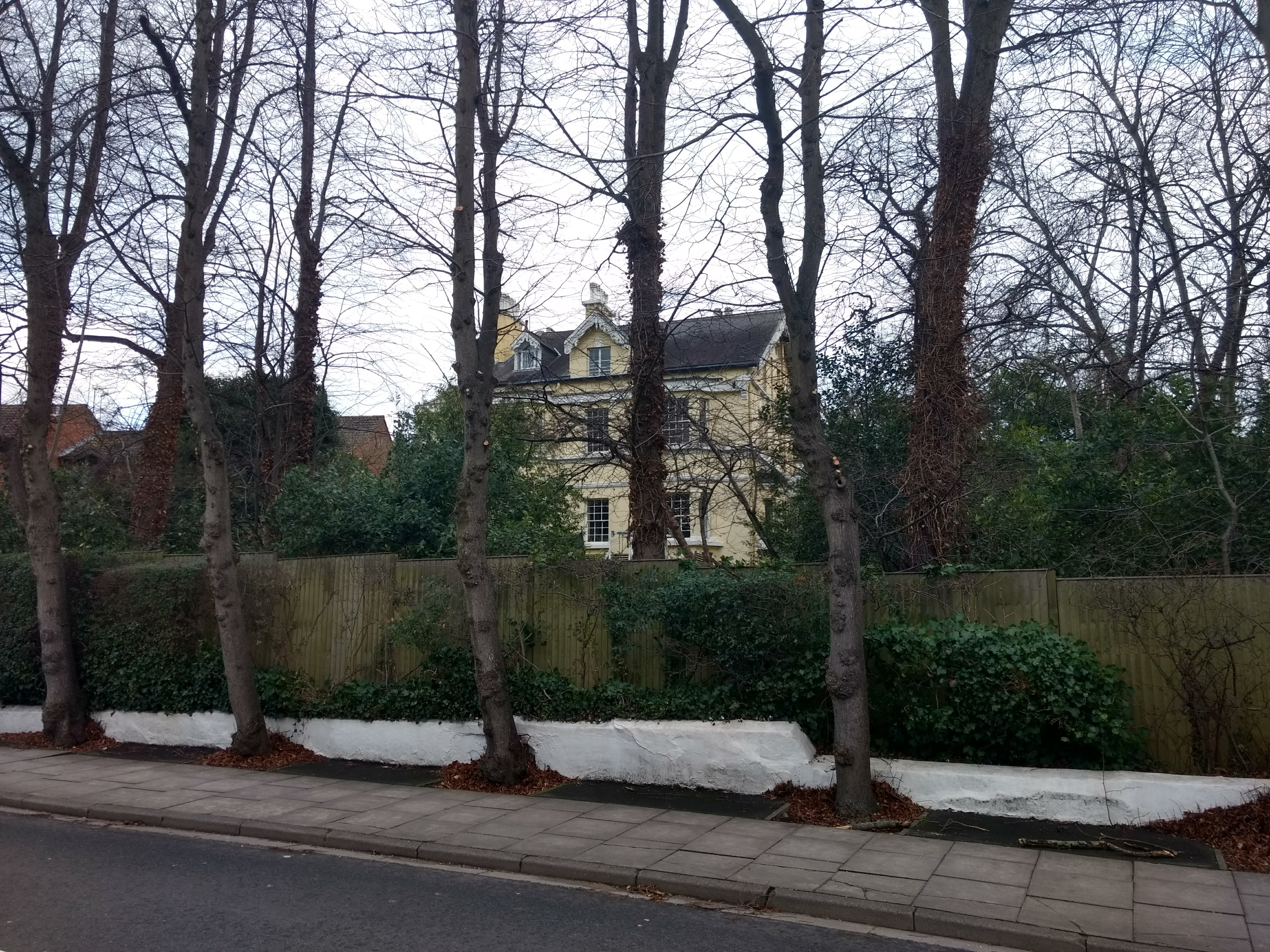
Modern view of 89 Park Road

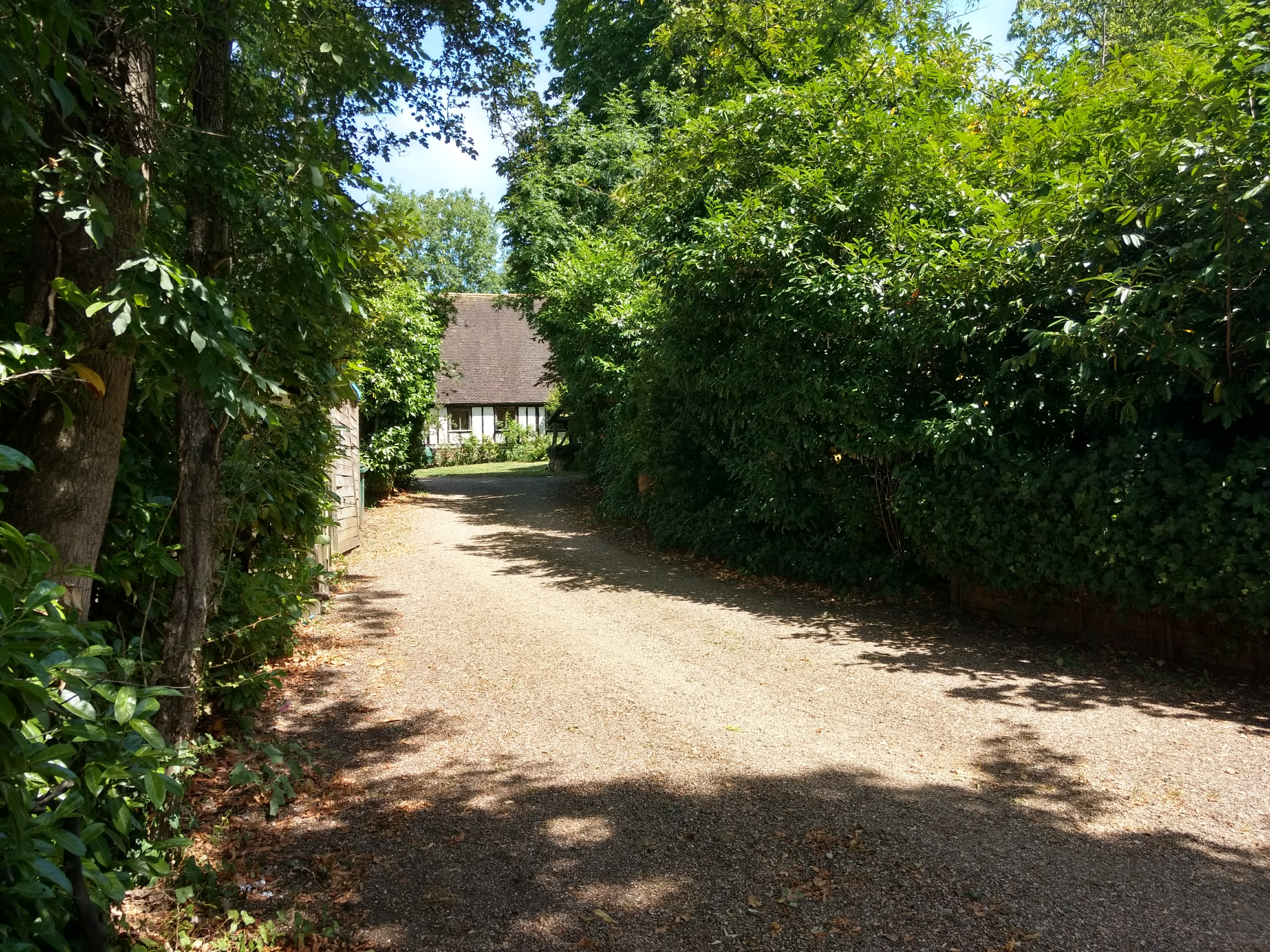
Approach to the centre from Park Road showing the tithe barn.

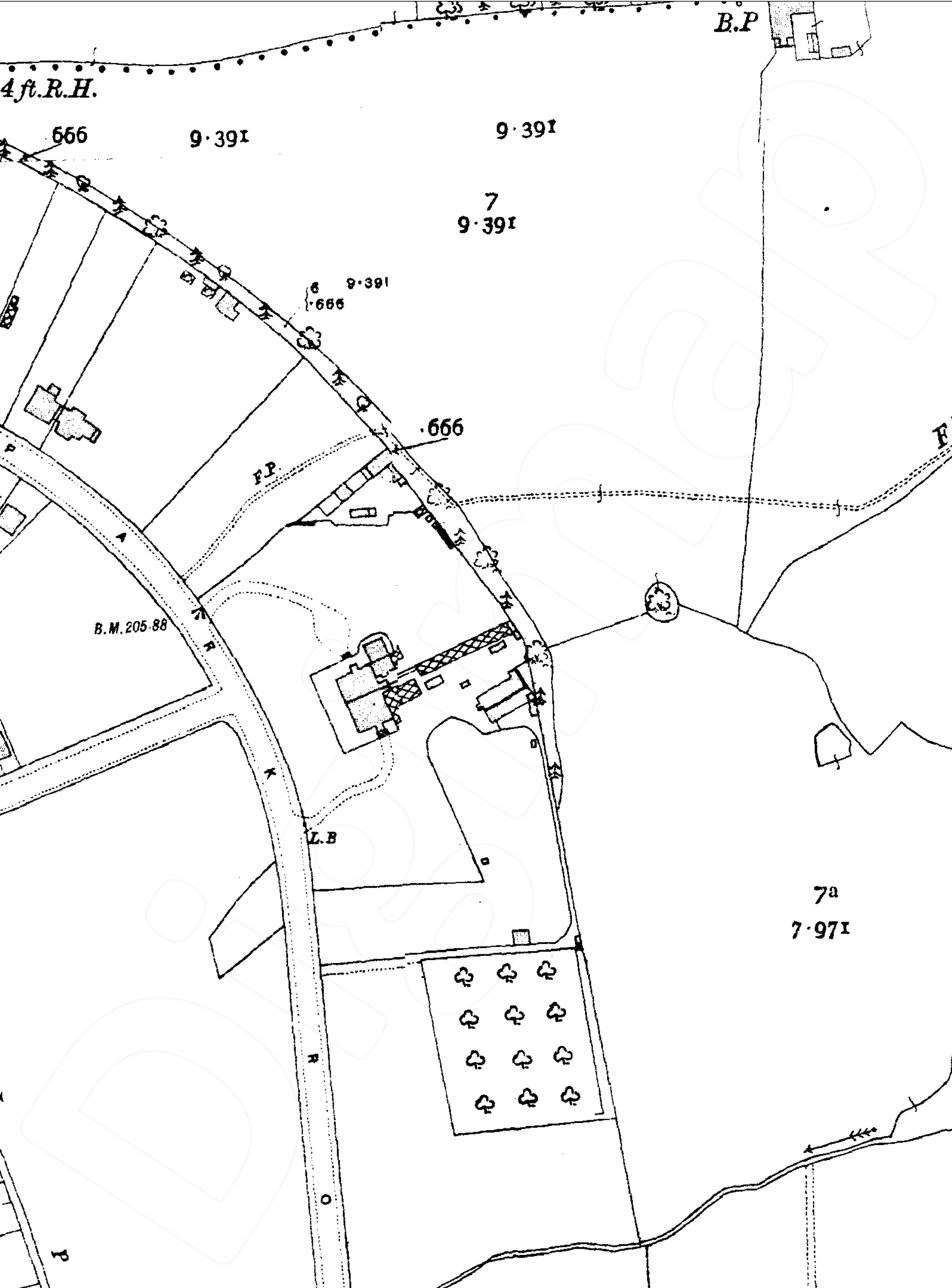
89 Park Road (centre) on a 1910s Ordnance Survey map.

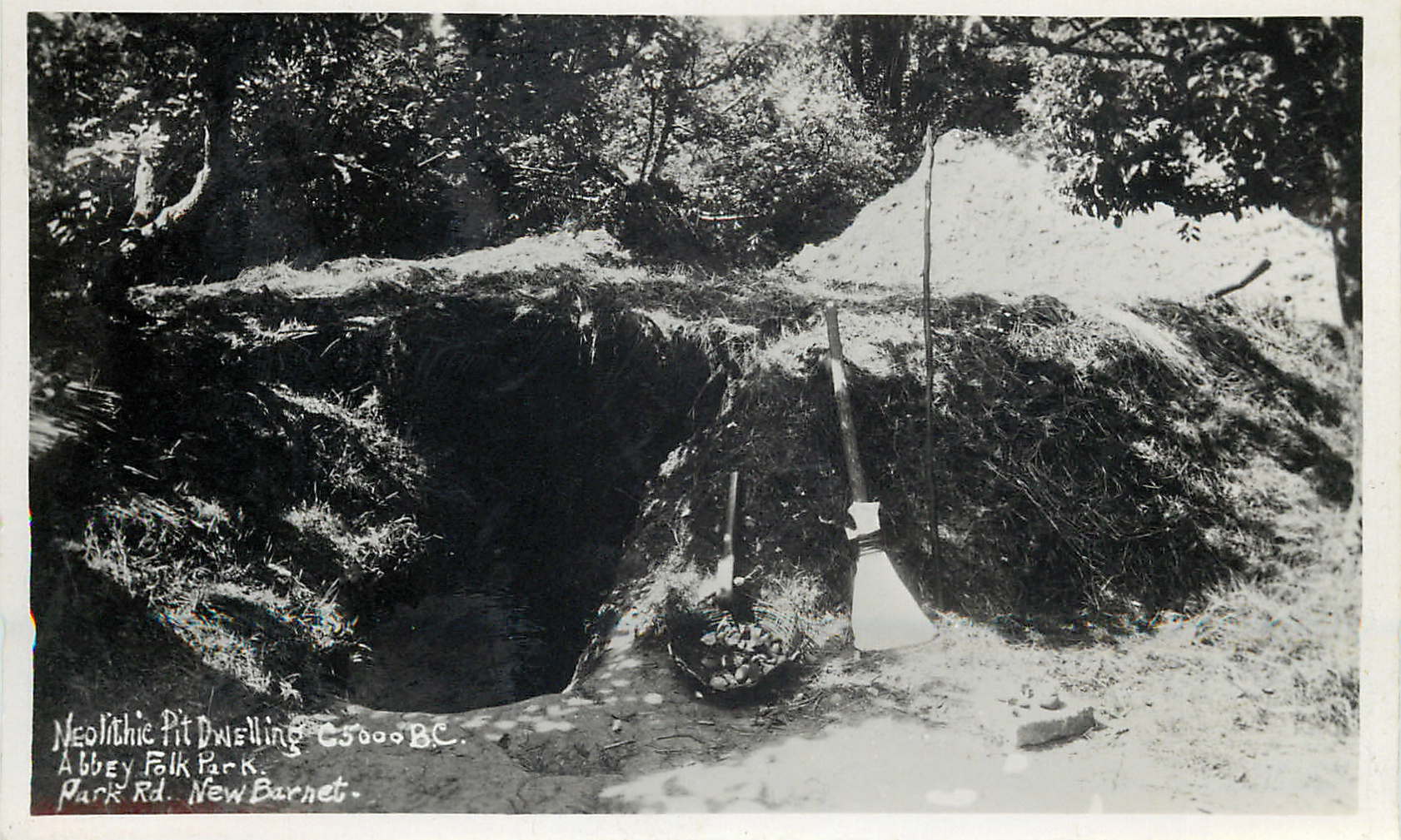
Replica Neolithic pit dwelling at Abbey Folk Park

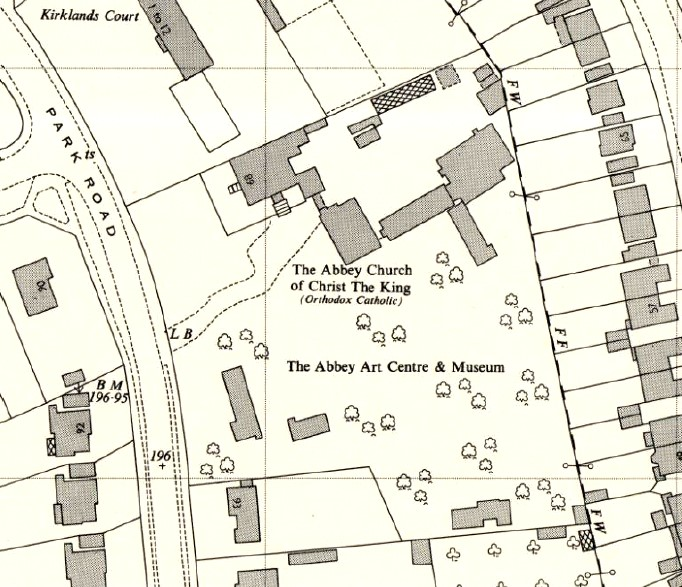
Abbey Arts Centre on a 1965 Ordnance Survey map.

The Abbey Arts Centre at 89 Park Road, New Barnet, England, was established in 1946 by William Ohly, an art dealer who ran the Berkeley Galleries in Davies Street, London.

== Early history ==
The area was undeveloped fields until the later part of the nineteenth century when Park Road and other streets were laid out. What is now number 89 was one of the first houses built in Park Road when it was constructed in 1873 and was originally divided into two semi-detached houses. It was known as Hadley Hall and the occupier, according to the Barnet directory for 1890–91, was George William Chambers Kirkham. Census returns show Kirkham to be a Manchester-born businessman in the cotton industry.

== Abbey Folk Park ==
Around 1930, John Sebastian Marlowe Ward became the owner of the site which a 1930 plan indicates was no longer divided into two houses. In that year, he purchased a circa 13th-century tithe barn (grade II listed) and relocated it to the site from Birchington in Kent. He subsequently converted it to a church and founded a religious community.

In 1934 he opened the Abbey Folk Park which by 1937 comprised 46 buildings, included historic shop fronts and a 17th-century smithy saved when East Barnet village was redeveloped and five old cottages relocated from Hadley Green. The park closed in 1940 and did not reopen before Ward sold it and moved his community to Cyprus in 1946 following legal difficulties in England.

== Art centre ==
The Abbey Art Centre and Museum was established in 1946 by William Ohly, an art dealer who ran the Berkeley Galleries in Davies Street, London. A small museum of ethnography in the tithe barn was opened by the director of the Arts Council in 1952.

The Abbey attracted many expatriate Australian artists to its doors during the post-war years 1947–1951. It became an early base of operations for artists, trying to gain a foothold in London's contemporary art industry.

Australian artists who stayed at the Abbey Art Center included: Noel Counihan, Leonard French, James Gleeson, Peter Graham, Douglas Green, Stacha Halpern, Grahame King, Robert Klippel and Bernard William Smith.

Other artists who visited the centre include the Scottish painter Alan Davie, the Irish painter Gerard Dilon, the English painter Phillip Martin, and Helen Grunewald and Inge Neufeld from Austria and Germany respectively. Also known to have visited are Henry Moore, John Heartfield and Lucian Freud.

Animation pioneer Lotte Reiniger and her husband Carl Koch (director) lived and worked at the centre for about 25 years.

== Modern ownership ==
Upon the death of William Ohly in 1954, his wife, Kate Ohly took over the day-to-day running of the Art Centre until her gradual retirement in the 1980's.

From the early 1980's William and Kate's daughter, Bienchen Ohly, took over the running and management of the Art Centre

As of May 2016, the property is owned by William Ohly's daughter Bienchen Ohly.

== See also ==
- Abbey Museum of Art and Archaeology

== Sources ==
- Smith, Bernard, Noel Counihan. Artist and Revolutionary, Oxford University Press Australia 1993 ISBN 0-19-553587-1
- Smith, Bernard, A Pavane for another Time, Macmillan, 2002, ISBN 1-876832-66-5
- Heathcote, Christopher, A quiet Revolution. The Rise of Australian Art 1946-1968, Melbourne: The Text Publishing Company, 1995, ISBN 1-875847-10-3
