= Sussenguth =

Sussenguth is a surname. Notable people with the surname include:

- Edward H. Sussenguth (1932–2015), American engineer
- Walther Süssenguth (1900–1964), German actor
