= John Sebastian Marlowe Ward =

British historian, Freemason and spiritualist

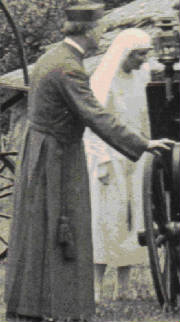
- John Ward standing next to his second wife Jessie about 1936
- Born: 22 December 1885; Belize
- Died: 2 July 1949 (aged 63); Limassol, Cyprus
- Resting place: Limassol
- Education: University of Cambridge (1908)
- Occupation: priest
- Title: Archbishop
- Spouses: Eleanor Caroline Lanchester (m. 1908; died 1926) Jessie Page (m. 1927)
- Partner: Ursula Cuffe (1948)
- Children: 2
- Parent: Herbert Ward

John Sebastian Marlow Ward (22 December 1885 – 1949) was an English author who published widely on the subject of Freemasonry and esotericism. He was also the leader of a Christian sect, and the founder of the Abbey Folk Park, the earliest example of a folk park in Britain.

He was born in what is now Belize. In 1908 he graduated from the University of Cambridge with honours in history, following in the footsteps of his father, Herbert Ward, who also had studied history before entering the priesthood of the Anglican Church.

John Ward became a prolific and sometimes controversial writer on a wide variety of topics. He made contributions to the history of Freemasonry and other secret societies. He was also a spiritualist medium, a prominent churchman and is still seen by some as a mystic and modern-day prophet.

== Biography ==
=== Early life ===
Born in British Honduras on 22 December 1885, Ward was the son of an Anglican clergyman, Herbert Marlow Ward. In 1888, the family returned to England, where Ward was educated at Colet Court, Merchant Taylors and Charterhouse. Proceeding to study History at Trinity Hall, a part of the University of Cambridge, he subsequently travelled around East Asia for many years, working as the headmaster of a Church of England school in Burma and then as the Principal Officer of Customs in Lower Burma. While working in the country, he spent much of his time studying Chinese secret societies, and with W.G. Stirling co-wrote a definitive book on the subject, The Hung Society: or the Society of Heaven and Earth, published in 1925 by the Baskerville Press.

=== Interests in history and antiques ===
It was also in 1908 that he published his first book, a short history of church brasses. His collection of some 1500 brass rubbings is now in London's Victoria and Albert Museum.

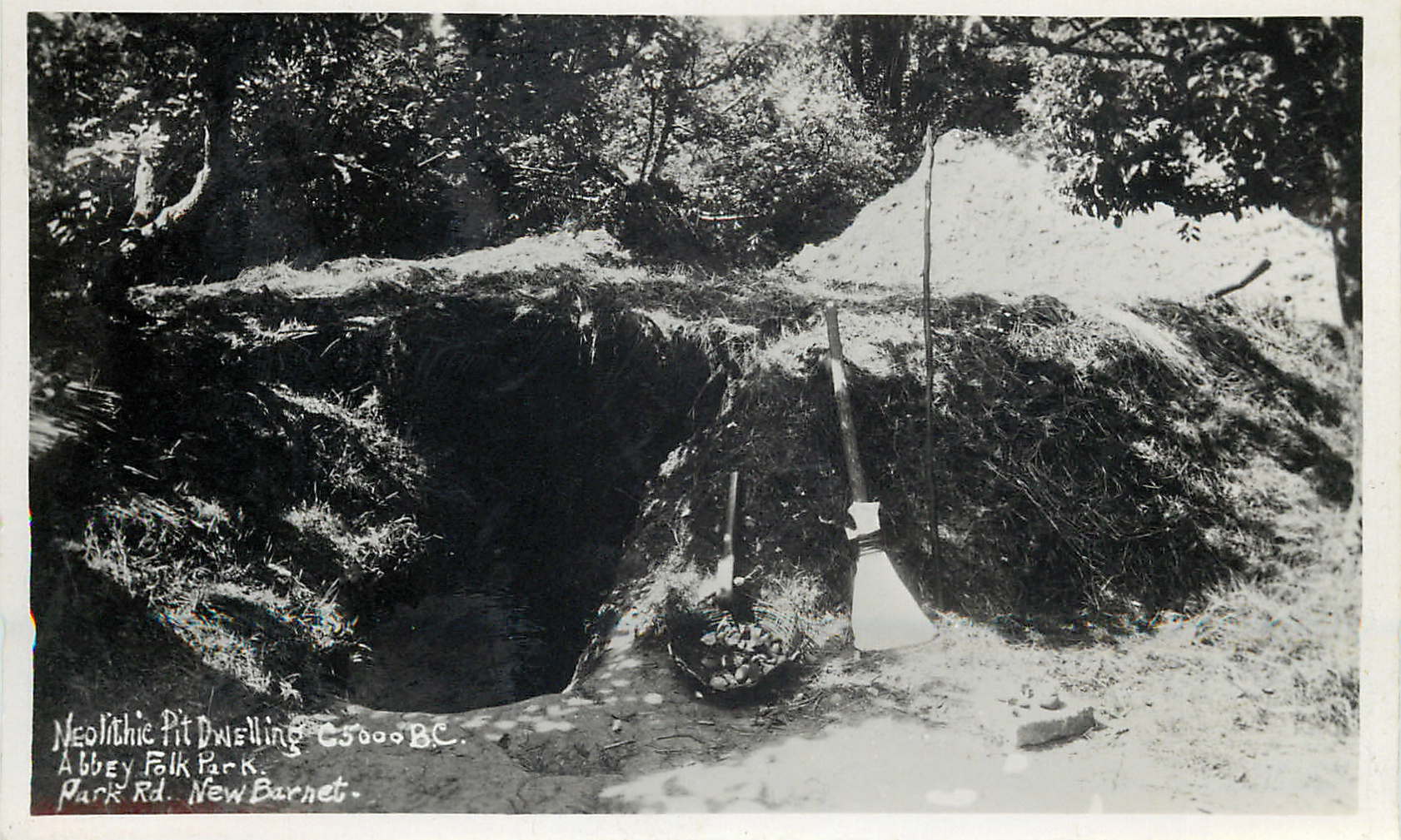
Replica Neolithic pit dwelling at Abbey Folk Park

After the First World War he accumulated a significant private collection of antiques and when from 1927 onwards he began to form the "Confraternity of the Kingdom of Christ", together with his second wife Jessie, he would frequently return from a day in London with their car laden with numerous historical pieces for the collection. A thirteenth-century tithe barn, painstakingly taken down, transported in pieces and re-erected at Park Road, New Barnet, just outside London, was filled with priceless antiques and opened as a church in 1930. On the same property an open-air museum, consisting of replica period buildings, filled with genuine antiquities was also constructed and became a major tourist attraction. This Folk Park, as it was called, was one of the first of its kind in the world. Much of the collection was reluctantly sold but the rest still survives under the custodianship of the present members of his community at the Abbey Museum of Art and Archaeology in Caboolture, Queensland, Australia.

=== Involvement with Freemasonry ===
Today, Ward is most widely known for his many books about the history and inner meanings of Freemasonry. These date mainly from the 1920s but most are still in print and available in a number of different languages. In them he traces the origins of modern Freemasonry back before its official 18th century beginnings to the far distant past. He believed that the movement had links with spiritual groups and secret societies in the ancient world as well as more recent institutions such as the Chinese Hung Society. His book on the Hung Society remained the source of articles in the Encyclopædia Britannica until long after his death and he remained listed among that encyclopedia's contributors, until late in the 20th century.

He saw Freemasonry as the successor of the ancient traditions of learning, and sought to convince his fellow masons to use that position to promote inter-religious harmony. His views remain controversial within Freemasonry. In 1987 the United Grand Lodge of England informed its members that "J.S.M. Ward's handbooks have no official standing and are not issued by Lodges to candidates. They were personal and very idiosyncratic interpretations of the history and meaning of the Craft rituals".

=== Involvement with spiritualism ===
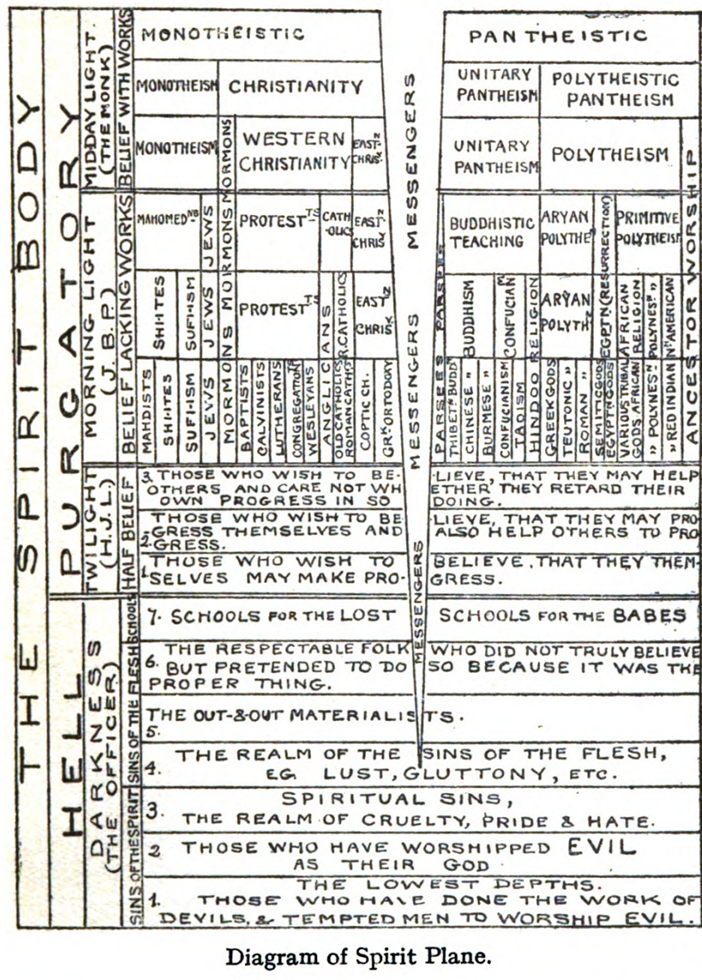
Diagram of Spirit Plane, 1917

Ward's activities as a medium and spiritualist brought him into conflict with many traditional churchmen. He had been brought up as an Anglican and officially remained a member of that church until 1934. Long before then, however, his wide-ranging spiritual interests had led him to seek for enlightenment in many other areas. According to his spiritualist book, Gone West, published in 1917, his first real link with the "other world" came in a dream early in December 1913 that predicted the death of his uncle H.J. Lancaster who died on 5 January 1914.

Shortly after the outbreak of the First World War Ward took a teaching job in the Far East. There he found many opportunities to continue his researches into the supernatural until poor health forced his return to England early in 1916. His poor eyesight had prevented him from joining the army, but the family had been represented on the Western Front by his younger brother, Reginald (Rex) who was eventually killed on Good Friday, 1916. This led Ward to undertake what he saw as his first helping mission in the afterlife. The account of how he first sought out the spirit of his dead brother and then assisted him to become established on the "astral plane" is the subject of his second spiritualist book A Subaltern in Spirit-Land also published in 1917. Although less well-known than his Masonic works, both of these books are still advertised for sale on the internet, in German as well as in English sites. According to another site, a Japanese edition is planned for 2010.

Ward's later spiritualist writings have tended to become linked with his Christian religious work and perhaps for this reason have been less widely read. In The Psychic Powers of Christ, Ward seeks to demonstrate that many of the "miracles" of Jesus Christ can be understood as psychic phenomena, which though greater than normal, were nevertheless of a similar nature to the recorded exploits of Eastern holy men and western mediums. This book, which clearly provides a link between Ward the spiritualist and Ward the Christian Mystic is still available, but mainly through the various Church groups that claim to be continuing his spiritual work.

=== Prophet and mystic ===
Among his supporters Ward is revered as a prophet and mystic or even as a saint. Most of his prophetic and mystical writings date from the 1930s and 1940s and include a series of ten apocalypses that he claimed to have received in early 1934. These are comparable in some ways to references in the Bible, but have also been interpreted as predicting the Second World War, the end of the British Empire, the end of white rule in South Africa and the rise of Islamic fundamentalism.

His other mystical experiences included claims of visits to the saintly and angelic realms, and visions of the more distant future. He predicted a number of terrible events preceding the second coming of Jesus, including a devastating biological attack on New York City. He saw the second coming of Jesus as a quite literal "establishment of the Kingdom of God on earth". To him, Christ was coming to judge mankind, as had long been foretold, yet he also predicted that although many would fail that test, many more would pass and although some of those would pass immediately to Heaven, most would be permitted to continue their lives on earth under his benign rule. He went on to say that through mysticism he had been able to "track" the gradual descent of Christ as he passed steadily through the various celestial realms on his way to earth.

Although neither Ward nor his successors have ever stated an exact date for the arrival of Jesus on earth, they have consistently maintained that the event is relatively close. Unlike most Christian groups they do not expect that they will be the only ones saved. They hold that all good souls, whether Christian or non-Christian, will receive the approval of Christ. Also, they say that some will be condemned to Hell and others will go to Heaven but that most will be permitted to enjoy the benefits of his reign on earth. Ward's followers also believe that Christ's coming will not mark the ending of the world, but merely the ending of this age and that after his time on earth is completed, a New Age will follow.

=== Founder of a religious community ===
Although descended from a line of clergy (both his father and grandfather were Anglican priests), neither Ward himself nor his younger brother, Rex, initially showed any desire for ordination. Even after Rex's death Ward turned to Spiritualism rather than to the traditional Christianity of his father, with the aim of helping his brother in the afterlife.

When he eventually did become a priest, he was as unconventional in that role as in his other fields of interest. Although never ordained in the Anglican Church, in 1927, Ward believing himself to be called by God to help prepare the world for the return of Christ, started a religious community dedicated to that end. Initially this was formed within the Anglican Church, but when some of his views offended certain senior officials, Ward first joined and later came to lead a small Christian group that had originated in the Far East. He was consecrated into the Orthodox Catholic Church by John Churchill Sibley in 1935 and succeeded him as Archbishop three years later. As archbishop he remained a controversial figure in England throughout the late 1930s and early 1940s. During this period he ordained several priests, including three from within his own community who were to continue his work after his premature death in 1949.

In early 1945, Stanley Lough, the father of Dorothy Lough, a 16-year-old member of the abbey, accused Ward of enticing his daughter away from her family, taking the case to court. After convening for 11 days in May, Ward was found guilty, fined £500, and Dorothy was ordered to return to her parents. By this time personally bankrupt, the fine was likely paid not by Ward himself but by the trustees of the confraternity. The only way that the abbey could regain their losses was to sell the Folk Park and its contents. One of those who took an interest in purchasing the items was Gerald Gardner (1884–1964), a friend of Ward's and pioneering figure in the Contemporary Pagan religion of Wicca. However, Gardner's specific interest was in magic and witchcraft, and so he decided to only obtain one of the Abbey's buildings, a 16th-century construct which Ward had claimed was a "Witch's Cottage". Rather than a cash transaction, Ward traded the cottage with Gardner for a plot of land that the latter owned at Gastria in Cyprus.

=== Move to Cyprus ===
Eventually, a legal and media campaign caused him to lead his community from England. They moved to Cyprus in 1946, where they established themselves as a self-supporting religious community.

He had already suffered a slight stroke before leaving England and eventually died from a more massive attack on 2 July 1949. He was buried in the local cemetery of Ayios Nicholas, near Limassol, in an unmarked grave that he afterwards came to share with two other members of his community.

His teachings and episcopal succession were continued by his community under the leadership of his wife Jessie and the clergy that he had personally ordained. Today there are a number of semi-independent groups generally called the Orthodox Catholic Church that have links with Ward.

== Works ==
- The Entered Apprentice Handbook
- The Fellow Crafts Handbook
- The Master Masons Handbook
- The Higher Degrees Handbook
- Brasses (Cambridge University Press, 1912)
- Fairy Tales and Legends of Burma (London: Blackie & Son, 1916)
- Gone West: Three Narratives of After-Death Experiences Communicated Through the Mediumship of J. S. M. Ward (London: W. Rider & Son, 1917)
- A Subaltern in Spirit-Land. A Sequel To "Gone West" (London: W. Rider & Son, 1919. Republished by Kessinger Publishing Company, 2004. ISBN 1-4179-5042-0)
- Freemasonry and The Ancient Gods (London: Simpkins, Marshall, Hamilton, Kent & Co, 1921. Republished by Kessinger Publishing Company, 2010. ISBN 978-1-1691-9629-2)
- Textile Fibres and Yarns (London: Ernest Benn Ltd, 1924)
- An Interpretation of Our Masonic Symbols (London: A. Lewis, 1924)
- Who Was Hiram Abiff? (London: Baskerville Press, 1925; reprinted in 1986 by London: Lewis Masonic, 1986. ISBN 0-85318-148-9. And by Kessinger Publishing Company, 1990. ISBN 978-0-7661-0451-8).
- An Explanation of The Royal Arch Degree (London: Baskerville Press, 1925)
- The Hung Society, or, The Society of Heaven and Earth (with W.G. Stirling). Three volumes. (London: Baskerville Press, 1925–1926)
- Told Through The Ages: A Series of Masonic Stories (London: Baskerville Press, 1926)
- The Moral Teachings of Freemasonry, Incorporating Masonic Proverbs, Poems and Sayings (London: Baskerville Press, 1926)
- Labour and Refreshment : Speeches, lectures and stories for many occasions (London : Baskerville Press 1926)
- The Sign Language of the Mysteries (London: Baskerville Press 1928)
- The Masonic Why and Wherefore: (being answers to 101 questions which perplex the average Mason) (London: Baskerville Press, 1929)
- The Kingdom of the Wise. Life's problems (London : Baskerville Press, 1929)
- The Psychic Powers of Christ (London: Williams and Norgate Ltd, 1936)

== Personal life ==
On 18 December 1908, he married Eleanor Caroline Lanchester, his older second cousin. They had one child, a daughter, born in October 1909, whom they named Blanche. In 1926, his wife died after a long illness. He married Jessie Page (b. 10 March 1890) on 4 April 1927. Ward later had a natural son, John Reginald Cuffe, with Ursula Cuffe.

== Sources ==
- R. Baker, The Scholar the Builders Rejected, 2001. From a Masonic point of view and quotes extensively from Masonic records.
- P. G. Strong, John Ward: The Prophet of These Times, 1999. A brief summary of Ward's life from a religious point of view that quotes extensively from his apocalyptic writings.
- Unpublished diaries of P.G. Strong, the last surviving priest ordained by Ward. This records the author's personal recollections of Ward, and provides detailed, though sometimes controversial accounts of his life and works.
