= Stacha Halpern =

Polish Australian painter and sculptor (1919–1969)

- Born: Stanislav Halpern; 20 October 1919; Zolkiev, Poland
- Died: 28 January 1969 (aged 49); Melbourne, Australia
- Known for: Painting, sculpture

Stanislav "Stacha" Halpern (20 October 1919 – 28 January 1969) was a Polish Australian painter and sculptor. Following the Nazi Germany invasion of Poland in 1939, Halpern emigrated to Australia. A decade later he became a naturalised Australian citizen. Based in Melbourne for much of his early career, Halpern painted bold semi-abstract works of street life. Later he travelled throughout Europe and experimented with pure abstraction and expressionistic portraiture. Australian artist and friend Arthur Boyd described Halpern's work as "original, vigorous and always arresting".

Paintings, sculptures and pottery by Halpern are held in several of Australia's public collections including the National Gallery of Australia, the National Gallery of Victoria and the Art Gallery of South Australia.
