= List of public art in Melbourne =

This is a list of public art on permanent public display in Melbourne, Victoria, Australia.

The list applies only to works of public art accessible in an outdoor public space; it does not include artwork on display inside museums. Public art may include sculptures, statues, monuments, memorials, murals and mosaics.

Year	Name	Image	Artist	Location	Notes	Ref
Late 1800s	Atlas		Unknown	406 Collins Street 37.8168807°S 144.9608172°E	Bronze	
C. 1850	Boy on a Turtle		Unknown	Fitzroy Gardens 37.8143866°S 144.9799082°E	Bronze 100 cm (height)	
1862	River God Fountain		Charles Summers	Fitzroy Gardens 37.8104242°S 144.9808692°E	Stone, cement 1000 cm (overall height approx.)	
1863	Grey Street Fountain		Unknown	Fitzroy Gardens 37.8115317°S 144.9829432°E	Cement 400 cm (height approx.)	
1864	Bandstand		George Dodd	Fitzroy Gardens 37.8118157°S 144.98265°E	Concrete, cast iron, roof tiles 7 x 5 x 6 m (H x W x D)	
1865	Robert O'Hara Burke and William John Wills		Charles Summers	City Square, Melbourne 37.815663°S 144.966523°E	Bronze, granite 800 x 300 x 300 cm (overall)	
1877	Henderson Drinking Fountain		Walter MacFarlane and Company Saracen Foundry, Glasgow	Out front of North Melbourne Town Hall 37.8033602°S 144.9497114°E	Cast iron 150 cm (height approx.)	
1880	Exhibition Fountain (or Hochgurtel Fountain)		Joseph Hochgurtel	Carlton Gardens south of the Royal Exhibition Building 37.8054227°S 144.9713886°E	Portland cement, stone, iron 1037 x 1830 cm	
1881	John Batman Memorial		J.W. Brown	Queen Victoria Market 37.8081265°S 144.9578679°E	Bluestone 450 x 100 x 100 cm (H x W x D)	
1887	Charles George Gordon		Hamo Thornycroft	Gordon Reserve 37.813°S 144.974°E	Limestone, Harcourt granite, bronze 330 cm (overall height)	
1887	Redmond Barry		James Gilbert & Percival Ball	Out of the ground outside the State Library Victoria 37.8100704°S 144.9643683°E		
1888	Westgarth Drinking Fountain		Alexander McDonald & Co	Carlton Gardens 37.8050925°S 144.9734151°E	Aberdeen pink granite, bronze 300 cm (overall height)	
1888	Unknown		Charles William Scurry	McClelland Sculpture Park and Gallery 38.14615°S 145.176636°E	It was originally in Federal Coffee Palace Melbourne.	
1889	Saint George and the Dragon		Joseph Edgar Boehm	Forecourt of State Library Victoria 37.8098888°S 144.9644856°E	Bronze	
1890	Daniel O'Connell		Thomas Brock	Outside of St Patrick's Cathedral, Melbourne 37°48′35.34″S 144°58′33.45″E	Commissioned 1886, cast in Belgium 1888, erected 1890	
1897	Francis Ormond		Percival Ball	Melbourne RMIT University City Campus 37.809127°S 144.964885°E		
C. 1900	Boy with Serpent Fountain (Ornamental Fountain)		Unknown	North of Conservatory, Fitzroy Gardens 37.8138763°S 144.9785844°E	Cast iron, granite 250 cm (height approx.)	
1901	Springthorpe Memorial		Bertram Mackennal (Sculptor) Harold Desbrowe-Annear (Architecture of the temple)	Boroondara General Cemetery 37°48′12.13″S 145°2′31.32″E	The memorial was built by John Springthorpe, in honour of his wife, Annie Springthorpe (née Inglis), who died in 1897 at the age of 30 while giving birth to their fourth child.	
1901	Duke & Duchess of York Memorial (AKA Temperence)		James Churchman & Sons	Victoria Square 37.8066348°S 144.9599032°E	Marble, granite, sandstone 200 cm (height approximately)	
1902	Lance Corporal George Rowland Button Memorial			Whitehorse Road, Box Hill 37.8182079°S 145.1250094°E		
1902	William John Clarke		Bertram Mackennal	Treasury Gardens 37.813679°S 144.974351°E	Marble 461 cm (overall height). 276 cm (sculpture); 185 cm (pedestal)	
1903	8 Hours Movement		Percival Ball	8 Hour Reserve 37.807155°S 144.9655882°E	Granite, bronze, gold-leaf, stone 1185 cm (height). 480 x 460 cm (base)	
1903	Robert Burns		George Anderson Lawson	Treasury Gardens 37°48′51.74″S 144°58′30.19″E	Bronze, granite 584 x 79 x 79 cm (overall). 300 cm (granite pedestal)	
1904	South African War Memorial		Joseph Hamilton	Queen Victoria Gardens 37.8259264°S 144.9718341°E	Sandstone, bluestone 1200 x 500 cm (overall approximately)	
1907	Queen Victoria		James White	Queen Victoria Gardens 37.821775°S 144.972305°E	White Carrara marble, Harcourt granite, NSW marble 1100 cm (overall height)	
1907	Joan of Arc		Emmanuel Frémiet	State Library Victoria 37°48′36″S 144°57′50.4″E	Bronze	
1908	Edmund Gerald FitzGibbon		James White	Intersection of St Kilda Road and Linlithgow Avenue 37.8236283°S 144.9704419°E	Harcourt granite, bronze 274.3 cm (Total height)	
1911	Marquess of Linlithgow		William Birnie Rhind	Junction of St Kilda Road & Linlithgow Avenue 37.826675°S 144.971906°E	Bronze, granite 778 cm (overall height). 350 cm (sculpture); 428 cm (pedestal)	
1913	Janet Lady Clarke Memorial Sculpture		Herbert Black	Queen Victoria Gardens 37.8223139°S 144.9718292°E	White marble, concrete, stamped copper 600 cm (overall height)	
1913	Henry Hawkins Skinner		James White	South Melbourne 37.838672°S 144.963457°E		
1914	Statue of James Cook, St Kilda		John Tweed	Royal Yacht Squadron Catani Gardens, St Kilda 37.863953°S 144.971553°E		
1915	Thomas Wilkinson Memorial			Brunswick 37.7774969299°S 144.960311951°E		
1916	George Hawkins Ievers Memorial Drinking Fountain		Charles Douglas Richardson	Intersection of Gatehouse Street and Royal Parade 37.7921734°S 144.9580566°E	Granite, bluestone, marble 400 x 100 x 100 cm (H x W x D)	
1918	Our Lady of Victories		Vincenzo Cadorin	Basilica, Camberwell	Height: 14 feet (430 cm) Material: wood, copper sheathed and plated with gold leaf	
1920	Edward VII		Bertram Mackennal	Queen Victoria Gardens 37.82281166°S 144.9705°E	Bronze, basalt, granite 427 x 472 x 229 cm (pedestal and statue). 200 x 2183 x 750 cm (semi-circular entrance)	
1925	Water Nymph		Paul Raphael Montford	Queen Victoria Gardens 37.821976°S 144.9710525°E	Bronze 120 cm (overall height)	
1925	Parkville Diggers Memorial (WWI Memorial)		Peter Morgan Jageurs	Royal Parade 37.7915582°S 144.9580779°E	Marble, granite, bluestone 550 cm (height)	
1925	Matthew Flinders		Charles Web Gilbert	St Paul's Cathedral37°49′1.21″S 144°58′2.21″E	Bronze, granite 596 cm (overall height). 359 cm (sculpture); 237 cm (base)	
1926	A Tribute To Our War Horses			Near Shrine of Remembrance 37.8295623°S 144.9740631°E		
1926	Edith Cavell		Margaret Baskerville	Kings Domain 37.8280945°S 144.9737737°E	Marble, granite, bronze 382 cm (overall height). 82 cm (bust); 300 cm (pedestal)	
1926	Peter Pan		Paul Raphael Montford	Melbourne Zoo 37.784728°S 144.952544°E	Bronze 150 cm (height approx.)	
1928	Farnex Hercules		Unknown	Queen Victoria Gardens 37.8211149°S 144.9696984°E	Marble, granite 246 cm (overall height). 80 cm (bust); 300 cm (pillar)	
1928	Farnex Hercules		Unknown	Queen Victoria Gardens 37.8211149°S 144.9696984°E	Marble, granite 246 cm (overall height). 80 cm (bust); 300 cm (pillar)	
1930	The Court Favourite		Paul Raphael Montford	Flagstaff Gardens	Bronze, granite 304 cm (overall height). 160 cm (sculpture); 144cm (base)	
1932	Carlo Catani		Paul Raphael Montford	St Kilda		
1932	Adam Lindsay Gordon		Paul Raphael Montford	Spring Street 37.812529°S 144.973524°E	Bronze statue on sandstone pedestal 289 cm (overall height). 147 cm (sculpture); 142 cm (pedestal)	
1933	Statue of Meditation		Robert Delandre	Conservatory, Fitzroy Gardens 37°48′50.3046″S 144°58′42.8718″E	Marble 166 x 196 cm (H x W)	
1934	Pioneer Women’s Memorial		Hugh Linaker	Kings Domain 37.82512°S 144.97608°E	It is a small garden in Kings Domain. It was dedicated by the women's Centenary Council through public subscription on the 100th anniversary of the foundation of the state.	
1934	Macpherson Robertson Fountain		Paul Raphael Montford	South-west corner of the Shrine of Remembrance 37.8323605°S 144.9729616°E	Granite, bronze, concrete 2100 cm (diameter)	
1935	Harry Malcolm Rogers Memorial			Bridges Reserve 37.7416919°S 144.9684145°E	The fountain is a large tall central column supported by four smaller columns with griffins.	
1935	The Man with the Donkey		Wallace Anderson	Shrine of Remembrance 37.829765°S 144.973965°E	Bronze 78 × 66 × 42 cm. Memorial to John Simpson Kirkpatrick	
1935	John Wesley		Paul Raphael Montford	Wesley Uniting Church 37.810072°S 144.968161°E		
1936	Domed Drinking Fountain		Unknown	Queen Victoria Gardens 37.8212395°S 144.9707736°E	Marble and granite 230 cm height	
1936	Boy and Pelican		William Leslie Bowles	Fitzroy Gardens 37.8138089°S 144.9827633°E	Pyrmont sandstone 258 cm (overall height). 128 x 95 x 51 cm (sculpture); 130 x 131 x 56 cm (base)	
1936	Mermaid and Fish		William Leslie Bowles	Fitzroy Gardens 37.8138089°S 144.9827633°E	Pyrmont sandstone 259 x 131 x 56 cm (H x W x D)	
1937	Samuel Mauger Drinking Fountain		Unknown	39 Gisborne Street, East Melbourne 37.8087455°S 144.9755894°E	Granite, lead lettering 120 x 160 cm (Hx W)	
1937	Driver & Wipers Memorial		Charles Sargeant Jagger	Shrine of Remembrance 37°49′47.56″S 144°58′25.45″E		
1937	George Higinbotham		Paul Raphael Montford	Old Treasury Building 37.812789°S 144.973974°E		
1940	Diana and the Hounds		Leslie Bowles	Fitzroy Gardens 37°48′51.486″S 144°58′42.516″E	Bronze, granite, concrete 317 x 90 x 148 cm	
1948	Model Tudor Village		Edgar Wilson	Fitzroy Gardens 37.8132687°S 144.980973°E	Cement, paint Dimensions variable	
1950	John Monash		Leslie Bowles	Birdwood Avenue, Kings Domain 37.826784°S 144.972766°E	Bronze 276 x 161 x 371 cm	
1952	King George V		Leslie Bowles	Kings Domain, near Sidney Myer Music Bowl Reserve 37.8242773°S 144.9731566°E	Bronze, sandstone, granite, bluestone 3.66 m (sculpture); 16.80 m (column)	
1954	Hand of God		Carl Milles	Southwest of Sidney Myer Music Bowl 37.8238849°S 144.9736213°E	Bronze The original was made for the Swedish city of Eskilstuna, and today it can also be seen in other places around the world, including Melbourne.	
1956	Olympic Pylon		Arthur Boyd	On the side of the Holden Centre in Swan Street 37.823703°S 144.980344°E	Victorian Heritage Register number H1977	
1959	The Trial of Socrates		Tom Bass	University of Melbourne		
1959	The Royal Society of Victoria Centenary Monument-Front.jpg			Royal Society of Victoria 37.8076351°S 144.9689861°E	This glacial boulder brought from Mawson, Antarctica.	
1960	Thomas Blamey		Raymond Boultwood Ewers	Kings Domain 37.826315°S 144.972824°E	Bronze, granite 368 cm (overall height)	
1963	Children's Tree		Tom Bass	Junction of Elizabeth Street and Collins Street 37.816109°S 144.963809°E	Bronze	
1964	Untitled		Norma Redpath	McClelland Sculpture Park and Gallery		
1964	Flight Arrested		Inge King	McClelland Sculpture Park and Gallery 38°8′44″S 145°10′33.1″E	Welded steel. 242 x 255 x 218 cm. It is the earliest of three Inge King works at the McClelland Gallery Sculpture Park.	
1964	Miraggio (also known as Seated Figure)		Pino Conte	Sidney Myer Music Bowl 37.824036°S 144.9741437°E	Bronze 274 cm (height) Donated by an anonymous ‘Lover of Italy’ to Sidney Myer Music Bowl.	
1965	Edward George Honey Memorial		Unknown	Kings Domain, near Shrine of Remembrance 37.8297536°S 144.9744181°E	Stone, bronze, aluminium 110 cm (overall height)	
1965	John F. Kennedy		Raymond B. Ewers	Treasury Gardens 37.8136629°S 144.9763925°E	Bronze, granite 150 cm (granite boulder height); 49 x 28 cm (bas relief) (H x W x D)	
1968	Desert Arch		Norma Redpath	McClelland Sculpture Park and Gallery		
1970	Sofia		Herman Hohaus	La Trobe University Sculpture Park 37.721869°S 145.048450°E	Cast bronze	
1970	Water Children		John Edward Robinson	Queen Victoria Gardens 37.8226144°S 144.9706879°E	Bronze 2 figures, 70 x 160 cm	
1973	Phoenix		Yrsa von Leistner	Queen Victoria Gardens 37.8224116°S 144.9705883°E	Cast bronze, welded copper sheet 326 cm (overall height)	
1973	The Genie		Tom Bass	Queen Victoria Gardens 37.8214518°S 144.9711725°E	Bronze 185 x 180 x 175 cm	
1973	Portal		Marc Clark	Eest of Sidney Myer Music Bowl 37.8235411°S 144.9753164°E	Painted steel Originally made in 1973, remade in 2024	
1974	Mary Gilbert		Ailsa O'Connor	Conservatory, Fitzroy Gardens	Cement fondu 81 x 53 x 36 cm	
1974	Pathfinder		John Edward Robinson	Queen Victoria Gardens 37.82201°S 144.9704022°E	Bronze 260 cm (diagonal line)	
1976	Dialogue of Circles		Inge King	In the Moat, near the Moat Theatre, directly north of the Union, in La Trobe University 37°43′20.4″S 145°2′59.8″E		
1976	Forward Surge		Inge King	Arts Centre Melbourne 37°49′14″S 144°58′5.8″E	50mm mild steel It got painted in 1981 516 x 1514 x 1368cm Commissioned by the William Angliss Art Fund	
1977	Dante's Divine Comedy		Bart Sanciolo	La Trobe University Sculpture Park	10 metres high, freestanding bronze	
1978	The Four Seasons		Leonard French	La Trobe University Sculpture Park	Stained glass	
1978	Rock Fall		Diego Latella	La Trobe University Sculpture Park	Steel	
1978-79	People’s Path		Ian Sprague et al.	Fitzroy Gardens 37.8110437°S 144.9784907°E	Clay Dimensions variable	
1979	John Batman		Stanley Hammond	Former National Mutual plaza, Collins Street 37.817687°S 144.959526°E		
1980	Vault		Ron Robertson-Swann	37°49′33.87″S 144°58′3.82″E	Painted steel 615 x 1184 x 1003 cm	
1980	Sun Ribbon		Inge King	University of Melbourne 37.797085°S 144.961956°E	The sculpture is made from 19mm thick steel. It was installed on Union Lawn in 1982.	
1981	Dervish		Clement Meadmore	37°49′11.5″S 144°58′1.7″E		
1981	Stages 1, 2, 3		Ronald Upton	Heide Museum of Modern Art, Bulleen	Ferrocement	
1981	Coles Fountain		Robert Woodward	Parliament Gardens, North of Parliament House 37.809521°S 144.973526°E	Stainless steel, bluestone 340 x 1000 cm	
1981	Walker Fountain		Digregorio Mobelt & Associates	Kings Domain 37.8235394°S 144.970814°E	Concrete 1700 cm (diameter)	
1981	Grotto Waterfall		City of Melbourne	Kings Domain 37.8254648°S 144.9770575°E	Basalt, cement Dimensions variable	
1984	Jabaroo		Inge King	McClelland Sculpture Park and Gallery 38°8′44″S 145°10′33.1″E		
1984	Basket and Wave		Dennis Oppenheim	Heide Museum of Modern Art, Bulleen	Steel, concrete, synthetic polymer paint	
1985	Landscape Caryatide		Norma Redpath	McClelland Sculpture Park and Gallery	Ceramic, steel, concrete 924.5 x 992.5 x 351.5cm	
1986	White Horse			White Horse Hotel Maroondah Highway, Box Hill	The statue of the white horse on the porch of the White Horse Hotel was a land mark in Box Hill. This replica of the statue was erected on the median strip in Whitehorse Road in 1986. The original horse is kept in the Box Hill Town Hall.	
1987 – 1989	Angel		Deborah Halpern	Birrarung Marr 37°49′06.71″S 144°58′24.60″E		
1987	Scales		Peter Rosman	Heide Museum of Modern Art, Bulleen	Mixed media, ferrocement	
1988	Shadow Form III		Robert Juniper	140 William Street 37.8158209°S 144.958335°E	The steel sculpture represents a clump of steel plants. The concrete plinth is a handy seat for office workers.	
1988	Dragonfly		Tom Merrifield	Pavlova Walk, Arts Centre Melbourne 37.822785°S 144.968097°E		
1989	Shell Mace		Charles O Perry	Northwest intersection of Flinders Street and Spring Street 37.815137°S 144.97444°E	Aluminum	
1991	Island Sculpture		Inge King	McClelland Sculpture Park and Gallery 38°8′44″S 145°10′33.1″E		
1992	Larry La Trobe		Pamela Irving	Corner of Collins Street and Swanston Street 37.815496°S 144.966638°E	Bronze, 70 cm hight Recast in 1996.	
1992	Ophelia		Deborah Halpern	Southbank Promenade 37.819790°S 144.966359°E	Ceramic tiles, steel, concrete. It was chosen as ‘the Face of Melbourne’ by Tourism Victoria in 1996.	
1992	Fortuna		Peter Corlett	Corner Queen Street and Flanklin Street 37.8090998°S 144.9582136°E	Concreate, 6 metres Hight	
1993	Architectural Fragment		Petrus Spronk	Swanston Street 37.809714°S 144.964102°E	Made from Port Fairy bluestone, it is rising out of the ground outside the State Library Victoria	
1993	Three Businessmen Who Brought Their Own Lunch: Batman, Swanston And Hoddle		Alison Weaver and Paul Quinn	Corner of Bourke Street and Swanston Street 37.813856°S 144.965543°E	Three whimsical, life-size bronze sculptures	
1993	Industrial Flowers		Akira Takizawa	Newport Park, Newport	Steel	
1993	A History Apparatus - Vessel, Craft and Beacon		Chris Reynolds	Corner of Russel Street and Bourke Street 37.8130142°S 144.9682353°E	Steel, fibreglass, bitumen, concrete, bluestone 450 x 2400 x 300 cm It sits above the first women's public toilet built in Melbourne in 1902	
1993	Weathervanes		Daniel Jenkins	Intersection of Swanston Street and Bourke Street 37.8135088°S 144.9656287°E	Copper, gold leaf 4 sculptures. 150 cm (bird, width); 150 cm (horse, width); 120 cm (fish, width); 120 cm (pig, width).	
1993	Mother and Daughter		Mary Perrott Stimson	Intersection of Wellington Parade and Hoddle Street, Richmond 37.8173694°S 144.9906432°E	Bronze and rendered brick	
1993 – 2021	Tennis champion busts		Mostly Barbara McLean	Australian Tennis Hall of Fame		
1994	Public Purse		Simon Perry	North West end of the Bourke Street Mall, outside of H&M/the GPO Building. 37.813965°S 144.963505°E	It is one of the biggest things in Australia.	
1994	Time and Tide		Akio Makigawa	Junction of Swanston Street and Little Collins Street 37.8143715°S 144.9662315°E	Bluestone, white marble, bronze, stainless steel, concrete, fibre optics 800 x 2000 cm	
1994	Resting Place		Bronwyn Snow	Corner of Swanston Street and Little Lonsdale Street 37.8104928°S 144.9640933°E	Steel, wood (Jarrah) 330 x 260 x 190 cm	
1994	Maltese War Memorial		Max Chester	Kings Domain 37.8287361°S 144.9740987°E	Timber 600 x 400 x 500 cm	
1994	Passage		Mark Stoner	Queen Victoria Market, corner of Therry and Queen Streets 37.8075°S 144.958253°E	Bluestone 300 cm (height approx.) It is to commemorates the Old Melbourne General Cemetery which was located on this site between 1837 and 1917.	
1994	Bunyip		Rob Brooks	Outside the State Library Victoria 37.810272°S 144.964264°E		
1995	Shearwater		Inge King	Southbank Promenade 37.820492°S 144.964278°E	Steel, paint 780 x 670 x 350cm. Originally commissioned by ESSO Mobil Australia.	
1995	Wind Contrivance		Pauline Fraser	Therry Street 37.807275°S 144.9592161°E	Bronze, redgum, harcourt granite 274 x 150 x 65 cm	
1995	Within Three Worlds		Loretta Quinn	Princes Park, Parkville 37.7789384°S 144.9611388°E	Bronze 60 cm (boats, length); 100 cm (child, height)	
1995	Dragoljub Mihailovic			Serbian National Centre, Carrum Downs 38.088193°S 145.180645°E		
1995	Edward Dunlop		Peter Corlett	Royal Botanic Gardens, Melbourne	Bronze, granite 260 x 80.3 x 50.5 cm A second edition of this statue (number 2 of 2) stands to the east side of the entrance to the Australian War Memorial. It was acquired by the Memorial in 1995.	
1996	Running Man		Rick Amor	Heide Museum of Modern Art	Bronze 170 x 50 x 183 cm	
1996	Rhythms of the Metropolis		Andrew Rogers	200 Queen Street 37.8138522°S 144.9603886°E	Bronze	
1996	The Echo		Edward Ginger	Junction of Swanston Street and Little Bourke Street 37.8127118°S 144.9651338°E	Mild steel plate, polyurethane paint 450 x 200 x 190 cm	
1996	Ceremony and Vehicle for Conveying Spirit		Maurie Hughes	Junction of Russel Street and Little Collins Street 37.813705°S 144.9685196°E	Silicon bronze, galvanized and mild steel 460 x 90 cm (urn); 267 cm (archway, height); 270 cm (sentinels, height)	
1997	Guardians		Simon Rigg	Southbank Promenade, outside of Crown Melbourne 37.821632°S 144.960050°E	Marble and clad with ceramic tiles.	
1997	Constellation		Geoffrey Bartlett and Bruce Armstrong	Southbank 37.8202541°S 144.9606488°E	Timber, copper, stainless steel five elements, each approximately 500 x 250 x 400 cm It captures the natural suggestions of clouds, the billowing of sails, rigging, the movement of wind vanes and the associations of ships' figureheads.	
1997	Stone House		Andy Goldsworthy	Herring Island	Dunkeld sandstone	
1997	Steerage		Jill Peck	Herring Island	Harcourt granite	
1997	Cairn		Andy Goldworthy	Herring Island	Castlemaine slate	
1997	Audience		Julie Collins	Herring Island	Bluestone	
1997	A Hill, A River, Two Rocks and A Presence		John Davis	Herring Island	Timber, limestone, and sandstone	
1997	Tanderrum		Ellen Jose	Herring Island	Castlemaine slate and redbox	
1997	Ted Whitten			Outside of the Whitten Oval 37.79976°S 144.885549°E		
1997	Doug Hawkins			Outside the Braybrook Hotel, Ballarat Road, Braybrook 37.779446°S 144.848050°E	A bronze, almost life-sized statue	
1998	Ramp		Robert Jacks	Herring Island	Red gum	
1998	Fossil Stones		Paul Blizzard	Along Macarthur Street From Old Treasury Building to St Andrews Place	18 sculptures Dimensions variable	
1998	Widow and Children		Louis Laumen	Legacy Garden of Appreciation, Shrine of Remembrance 37.8302742°S 144.9743548°E		
1999	Scaled Stem		Robert Bridgewater	Herring Island	Cyprus macrocarpa	
1999	Neutrino		Glen Dunn	Royal Botanic Gardens Victoria 37.8298338°S 144.9755509°E	The sculpture commemorates the opening of the Observatory Gate at the Botanic Gardens in 1999.	
1999	Threaded Field		Simon Perry	Different places around Docklands Stadium 37.81539°S 144.947047°E		
1999	Cow Up A Tree		John Kelly	Harbour Esplanade, Docklands 37.817064°S 144.945266°E	Bronze, oil-based paint A surreal sculpture	
1999	Unity 1998-99		Stephen Glassborow	In front of Box Hill Town Hall, In the middle of Whitehorse Road 37.8184777°S 145.126854°E		
1999	Tilly Aston Bell		Anton Hasell	Kings Domain 37.825328°S 144.975953°E	Bronze 152 x 35 cm (Height x Width)	
1999	Daniel Mannix		Nigel Boonham	Outside of St Patrick's Cathedral, Melbourne 37°48′38.05″S 144°58′33.46″E	Commissioned 1997, erected in March 1999	
1999	St Peter the Fisherman		Louis Laumen	St Peter's Catholic Church, Toorak 37.8417666°S 145.0162361°E		
1999	Rupert Hamer		Peter Corlett	Treasury Gardens 37.813431°S 144.9749348°E	A life-size bronze statue	
1999	Albert Dunstan and Henry Bolte		Peter Corlett	Treasury Gardens 37.81336°S 144.9751957°E	A life-size bronze statue	
1999	John Cain		Peter Corlett	Treasury Gardens 37.8132909°S 144.9753425°E	A life-size bronze statue	
2000	Fairfield Industrial Dog Object		Ian Sinclair, Jackie Staude, David Davies and Alistair Knox	37°46′44.5″S 145°1′4.6″E	It is one of the biggest things in Australia. The work is constructed from recycled hardwood, standing 5.5 metres tall and approximately 8 metres long.	
2000	Sentinel		Inge King	Located at junction of the Eastern Freeway and Doncaster Road, Doncaster 37°47′18.2″S 145°6′11.6″E	The 13-metre high and 12 tonnes weight sculpture's curved shape symbolises the two creeks of the municipality - the Mullum Mullum and the Koonung Creeks.	
2000	St Francis of Assisi		Louis Laumen	St Patrick's Cathedral, Melbourne 37°48′37.56″S 144°58′35.78″E		
2000	St Catherine of Siena		Louis Laumen	St Patrick's Cathedral, Melbourne		
2001	River Peel		Michael Bellemo & Cat MacLeod (Bellemo & Cat)			
2001	Windhover		Lenton Parr	Sandringham foreshore (near to where Parr lived)	Stainless steel	
2001	Falling Fence		John Gollings with Samantha Slicer	Herring Island	Cypress-pine	
2001	Australian Hellenic Memorial		Evangelos Sakaris	Kings Domain 37.8274828°S 144.9731071°E	Granite, cast bronze, white marble 12 columns, 300 x 3600 x 3600 cm (overall approx.)	
2001	Alojzije Stepinac		Mladen Mikulin	St Patrick's Cathedral, East Melbourne 37.810451°S 144.97671°E		
2001	Rod Laver			Outside the Rod Laver Arena 37.822282°S 144.9789986°E		
2001	First Australian Rules Football Game		Louis Laumen	Melbourne Cricket Ground 37.818839°S 144.982038°E	Dedicated to Tom Wills	
2001	Sidney Myer		Michael Meszaros	Sidney Myer Music Bowl 37.8240826°S 144.9754875°E	Bronze 220cm H x 300cm W x 100 cm D	
2002	Federation Bells		Anton Haselt and Neil MacLachlan	Birrarung Marr 37.8187328°S 144.974162°E	39 brass bells The bells were created for celebrations for the centenary of Australia's federation in 2001.	
2002	Victoria Police Memorial		Anton Hasell and Marcus Ward	Queen Victoria Gardens 37.824285°S 144.9710185°E		
2002	Sportsmanship Melbourne		Mitch Mitchell	Olympic Park Oval 37°49′29″S 144°58′52″E	This statue depicts sportsmanship by John Landy helping his fellow runner Ron Clarke.	
2003	Shoal Fly		Michael Bellemo & Cat MacLeod (Bellemo & Cat)	Harbour Esplanade in front of Docklands Stadium 37.817391°S 144.945298°E	It is a sculpture group. It is not there anymore.	
2003	Eagle		Bruce Armstrong	Grand Hyatt Melbourne (123 Collins Street) 37.8153942°S 144.9695914°E	Until 2013 it was located on Wurundjeri Way, Docklands. Then it moved to Grand Hyatt Melbourne forefront.	
2003	Silence		Adrian Mauriks	NewQuay Promenade, Docklands 37.815208°S 144.941790°E	Fibre Glass 13 elements 460 x 1250 x 1850 cm (overall) It doesn't exit there anymore.	
2003	2002 Bali Bombings Memorial		Perry Lethlean	Lincoln Square, Swanston Street, Carlton 37.802454°S 144.9632997°E	Granite, concrete, stainless steel 20 x 1220 x 1220 cm	
2003	Island Wave		Lisa Young	Newmarket Reserve, Kensington 37.7876689°S 144.9218259°E	Mild steel, paint, concrete footing 22 fins; 270 cm (fin height); 500 cm (fin length); 34 cm (fin width); 2.5 cm; (steel thickness); 31 m (approx. overall span of sculpture)	
2003	Eel Trap		Fiona Clarke (Kirrae Whurrong) and Ken McKean	Birrarung Marr 37.8194463°S 144.9751195°E	Plate steel, paint 150 x 400 x 350 cm (H x W x D)	
2003	Betty Cuthbert		Louis Laumen	Melbourne Cricket Ground 37.8185457°S 144.9840991°E		
2003	Ron Barassi		Louis Laumen	Melbourne Cricket Ground		
2003	Don Bradman		Louis Laumen	Melbourne Cricket Ground 37.8205665°S 144.9849969°E		
2004	Landmark		Charles Robb	La Trobe University	Fibreglass, polyester resin, steel, polystrene, polyurethane, sand, automotive lacquers, acrylic paint 490.0 x 130.00 x 130.0 cm	
2004	Manna Gum		Simon Horsburgh	Bulleen Park (next to main oval carpark)	Made from recycled materials. Inspired by the local eucalypt blossoms and marks the start of the Bolin Bolin Cultural Landscape Trail.	
2004	Reed Vessel		Virginia King	Henry Doodie Park, Docklands 37.821947°S 144.947337°E	Materials: Vessel Hull 5mm, Vessel Cladding 2mm Marine Grade 316 Stainless Steel. Aluminium louvers, recycled plastic decking, aluminium and bronze castings. The sculpture embraces themes of migration, the river and the sea.	
2004	Signature Work		Emily Floyd	Harbour Esplanade, Docklands 37.8191959°S 144.9472163°E	Cast aluminium plate, polyurethane paint	
2004	James Joyce Seat of Learning		Rick Dalmau	Forecourt of State Library Victoria 37.8103904°S 144.9645144°E	Brick is from James Joyce home in Drumcondra, Dublin.	
2004	George Adams		Stephen Walker	St Kilda Road 41.625808°S 147.148008°E		
2004	John Brosnan		Peter Corlett	Brunswick, Victoria		
2004	Dick Reynolds		Louis Laumen	Melbourne Cricket Ground 37.8212286°S 144.983798°E		
2004	Shirley Strickland		Louis Laumen	Melbourne Cricket Ground 37.8186272°S 144.9844326°E		
2005	Blowhole		Duncan Stemler	Docklands	Steel, anodized steel, gears 1500 cm height	
2005	Rings of Saturn		Inge King	Heide Museum of Modern Art 37°45′31.7″S 145°4′58.3″E	Stainless steel 45.5 x 51 x 61 cm Gift of Inge King through the Heide Foundation 2006	
2005	Continuum		Michael Snape	Bourke Street, Docklands 37.818937°S 144.947412°E	Continuum is essentially about the dance of life, reflecting the human condition of being alive. The interconnected figures encircle each other and reach up to the sky, conveying a sense of community, cooperation and wellbeing. The artist was inspired by Docklands coming to life again, impacting on the community’s sense of self and causing “an internal shift: this is the continuum.”	
2005	Lillies		Adrian Mauriks	NewQuay Promenade, Docklands 37.8145047°S 144.9431235°E	Painted epoxy resin and aluminium. It exhibited in Contempora 2, Docklands Festival of Sculpture at New Quay	
2005	The Travelers		Nadim Karam & Atelier Hapsitus	Queensbridge Square, Southbank 37.8210224°S 144.9618235°E	More than 3.7 km of stainless steel (in 4455 pieces) was used to create these sculptures. The average weight of each figure is 2307 kg while the heaviest figure is 7701kg. 10 different sculpture representing 10 periods Australian immigration.	
2005	St Mary Mackillop		Louis Laumen	St Patrick's Cathedral, Melbourne		
2005	Bill Ponsford		Louis Laumen	Melbourne Cricket Ground 37.8198408°S 144.9814068°E		
2005	Leigh Matthews		Louis Laumen	Melbourne Cricket Ground 37.820678°S 144.985702°E		
2005	Poise		Warren Langley	Next to Docklands Stadium 37.8180089°S 144.9468161°E	6m high x 5m diameter	
2006	Aqualung		John Meade	Captain Walk, Docklands 37.8188749°S 144.9449886°E	Glass reinforced concrete, pigment, steel 9 tonnes 30 meters	
2006	The Relic		Rick Amor	McClelland Sculpture Park and Gallery	Bronze, cor-ten steel: 204. cm × 62 cm × 72 cm (80 in × 24 in × 28 in); There is another version of this sculpture in Canberra located near the intersection of Childers Street and University Avenue.	
2006	Aurora		Geoffrey Bartlett	Corner of Harbour Esplanade and Bourke Street, Docklands 37.818704°S 144.9468114°E	Stainless Steel 12.0 x 12.0 x 12.0 m Resembling an inverted cargo net the sweeping curves and net-like construction of Aurora makes a symbolic lInk to the history of Docklands as Victoria's most important port and a place of transit for goods and people.	
2006	Diver		Simon Perry and Drew Cole	Newport Lake's entrance	Bluestone	
2006				Wharf Lane, Docklands 37.8227916°S 144.9531462°E	72 fish sculptures were created to represent each nation competing in the Melbourne 2006 Commonwealth Games.	
2006	Rings of Jupiter		Inge King	Federation Square 37.8179224°S 144.9692012°E	Stainless steel 180.0 × 210.0 × 216.0 cm	
2006	Birrarung Wilam (Common Ground)		COUZENS, Vicki (Kirrae Wurrong/Gunditjmara); DARROCH, Lee (Yorta Yorta, Mutti Mutti and Trawlwoolway); HAMM, Treahna (Yorta Yorta)	ArtPlay, Birrarung Marr 'Birrarung Wilam' 37.8184568°S 144.9720138°E	Stone, wood, stainless steel, bronze, nickel, audio installation Various sizes in a 10 x 7 m (overall approx.) area	
2006	Charles La Trobe		Peter Corlett	State Library Victoria 37.809631°S 144.964213°E	Bronze Gifted to the Library by the La Trobe Society	
2006	Nellie Melba		Peter Corlett	Coombe Yarra Valley Estate, Coldstream 37.719483°S 145.380251°E	Bronze It was located in Waterfront City, Docklands. In 2022 it is moved to Coombe Yarra Valley Estate, Coldstream.	
2006	Kylie Minogue		Peter Corlett (sculptor)-Statues David Jack (Mural) Original art	Waterfront City, Docklands 37.815327°S 144.939411°E	Bronze, dressed in a lace bodystocking and electric red heels	
2006	Dame Edna Everage		Peter Corlett (sculptor)-Statues David Jack (Mural) Original art	Docklands	Bronze	
2006	John Farnham		Peter Corlett (sculptor)-Statues David Jack (Mural) Original art	Waterfront City, Docklands	Bronze	
2006	Graham Kennedy		Peter Corlett (sculptor)-Statues David Jack (Mural) Original art	Waterfront City, Docklands	Bronze	
2006	Bob Rose		Mitch Mitchell	Holden Centre, Olympic Park Oval 37.823579°S 144.979636°E	Bronze	
2006	Dennis Lillee		Louis Laumen	Melbourne Cricket Ground 37.8190431°S 144.9818701°E	Bronze	
2007	Requiem for a Champion		Yvonne George	Altona Coastal Park	Bronze, steel and paint	
2007	Pastor Sir Douglas Nicholls and Lady Gladys Nicholls Memorial		Louis Laumen	Spring Street, Parliament Gardens, East Melbourne 37.809992°S 144.973605°E	Bronze 270 cm (height)	
2008	Colony		Troy Innocent	Right corner of 198 Harbour Esplanade 37.8143°S 144.9451°E	It is a network of sculptures, designed to interact as an ecosystem.	
2008	Hotel		Callum Morton	Eastlink Motorway		
2008	Great Petition		Susan Hewitt and Penelope Lee	Burston Reserve in East Melbourne 37.81150°S 144.97519°E	Bluestone and steel	
2008	Public Art Strategy		Emily Floyd	Eastlink Motorway		
2008	Red Rings		Inge King	Junction of the eastLink Trail and the Dandenong Creek Trail 37.899511°S 145.213959°E	The Red Rings challenges passers, by to walk through and arouse their curiosity to explore the forms. The three painted steel rings are each 2.5 metres in diameter.	
2008	Orion		Michael Bellemo & Cat MacLeod (Bellemo & Cat)	430 St Kilda Road 37.83714°S 144.9753°E		
2008	Unfurling		Andrew Rogers	Forecourt, National Foods Building, Docklands 37.81857°S 144.9487231°E	Bronze Each organic form is delicately balanced on a tightly curled base that unfurls as it extends upwards and outward in a continuously rippling spiral shape.	
2008	The Reuniting Family		Michael Meszaros	525 Collins Street 37.818223°S 144.957685°E	It is to commemorate Italian Immigration and all migrants to Australia.	
2008	Mercury Rising		Matthew Harding	Slightly south of the corner of Bourke Street and Elizabeth Street	Mirror polished stainless steel (sand cast) with inlaid stainless steel contour lines. 3 elements with variable dimensions, Medium: 2000 x 1000 x 450hmm Small: 600 x 500 x 300hmm	
2008			Michael Meszaros	Women’s Hospital footpath sculpture, Parkville 37.799306°S 144.955276°E	Bronze 230cm (H) x 300cm (W)	
2008	Once Upon a Slime		Helen Bodycomb	ArtPlay, Birrarung Marr 37.8184103°S 144.9716086°E	Glass, ceramic, stone mosaic, polystyrene Dimensions variable	
2008	Cobbers		Peter Corlett	37.83228°S 144.972523°E		
2009	Serpent II		Bert Flugelman	Foyer, 28 Freshwater Place	Stainless steel	
2009	Interlocked II		Inge King	37.8184103°S 144.9716086°E	Four interlocked rings Private collection	
2009	Leonidas I			Brunswick, Victoria 37.7664766992°S 144.962291548°E	It symbolizes the friendship and connection between Greece and Australia.	
2010	Centenary of First Powered Controlled Sustained Circuit Flight in Australia			Diggers Rest, Victoria 37.6286694444°S 144.721405556°E	Sculpture commemorating Harry Houdini and the first powered flight in Australia	
2010	Spun Chair		Thomas Heatherwick	Ian Potter Centre: NGV Australia, Flinders Street 37.8173236°S 144.9688148°E	Designed in 2010 by Thomas Heatherwick. Manufactured in 2016 by Magis, Torre di Mosto, Italy	
2011	The River Runs Through		Mark Stoner	Australian Warf, Docklands 37.8220789°S 144.9445373°E	Pre-cast concrete, brick and plantings Dimensions variable	
2012	Mr Lizard and Gumnut Baby		Smiley Williams	Forecourt of State Library Victoria 37.809795°S 144.9643803°E	Bronze Based on Snugglepot and Cuddlepie by May Gibbs	
2011	Shane Warne		Louis Laumen	Outside Melbourne Cricket Ground 37.8185155°S 144.9830859°E		
2013	Raising the Rattler Pole - the Last of the Connies		David Michael Bell	Corner of Spencer Street and Flinders Street 37.8209372°S 144.9547809°E	It is a 1:1-scale replica and tilted at 10 degrees and finished in a bluestone effect. The Rattler is a reproduction of Tram 1040, the 40th and last tram built at the Preston Tram Works to service Bourke Street in 1956.	
2013	Fruition		Matthew Harding	Royal Park, Parkville 37.7895932°S 144.942993°E	Corten steel Two sculptures, 650 cm (axis length); 420 cm (sculpture, axis length)	
2013	Ferdinand von Mueller		Marc Clark	National Herbarium of Victoria 37.830614°S 144.977185°E		
2013	John Coleman		Lis Johnson	Melbourne Cricket Ground		
2013	Frog		John Olsen	Queen Victoria Gardens 37.8224475°S 144.970472°E	Bronze 200 cm (height)	
2014	Apparatus for Transtemporal Occurrence of Impending Space		Russell Anderson	Lower pontoon, North Bank Wharf 37.823264°S 144.953001°E	Stainless steel, bronze, copper, electro-mechanical components	
2014	Run for Your Life		Gillie and Marc	La Trobe University Sculpture Park	Bronze Dimensions variable	
2014	Shadow Trees		Sally Smart	Corner of Bourke Street and Collins Street, Docklands 37.8205992°S 144.9409424°E	Painted and fabricated mild steel 1200 cm (height)	
2014	Wulunj (Digging Stick)		Glenn Romanis, Brodie Hill	720 Bourke Street, Docklands 37.8179094°S 144.9484557°E	Australian Hardwood, Salvaged Pier Pylon, Basalt.	
2014	Jim Stynes		Lis Johnson	Melbourne Cricket Ground		
2015	Australian Turkish Friendship Memorial		Matthew Harding	Kings Domain 37.828318°S 144.973953°E	3.8m height	
2016	Comfort woman			37.910064°S 145.102449°E	This statue is a copy of the one outside the Japanese Embassy in South Korea.	
2017	Summertime		Anne Ross	Brighton Dog Beach, Brighton 37.907414°S 144.985322°E	Bronze It is a tribute to the local dog beach.	
2017	Kevin Bartlett		Lis Johnson	Yarra Park	Bronze	
2018	Taken Not Given		Anne Ross	St Andrew’s Reserve 37.8122492°S 144.9776534°E	Cast bronze, silver nitrate patina 180 cm (woman height); 110 cm (young girl height); 54 cm (infant boy height); 30 x 120 x 180 cm (plinth)	
2022	Resting Light		Donal Molly-Drum	Box Hill Town Hall 37.8191202°S 145.1268647°E		
2023	Zelda D’Aprano		Jennifer Mann	Outside Trades Hall Victoria 37.806706°S 144.966186°E	Bronze	
2024	Water Spirit		Vipoo Srivilasa	North corner of Home Docklands 37.8147°S 144.9468°E	It celebrates the power of water in bringing people together and fostering connection and placemaking.	
2024	Time Talker		Alexander Knox	West corner of Docklands Stadium 37.8152°S 144.9470°E	This gleaming iridescent shell figure speaks of a time when Melbourne was wild and the Docklands area encompassed the extensive wetlands ecosystem of the Birrarang (Yarra Delta).	
	Construct V		Adrian Mauriks	Chadstone Shopping Centre		
	Construct II		Adrian Mauriks			
	Orchid		Robyn Latham	Greensborough railway station 37.7037895°S 145.1076715°E		
			Paul Raphael Montford	Shrine of Remembrance 37.830594°S 144.973752°E	Four large buttress statues of the Shrine representing Peace and Goodwill, Patriotism Justice Sacrifice	
	Tianjin Garden Chinese Lion Guardians		Unknown	Cohen Place, Little Bourke Street 37.8112996°S 144.9693688°E	Sichuan white marble 180 cm (lion, height)	
	Makybe Diva			Glenferrie Road, Hawthorn		
	Melbourne Graffiti					
	Unknown			Outside BaroqHouse, Drewery Lane 37.811217°S 144.964125°E		
	Unknown			990 La Trobe St, Docklands 37.8142013°S 144.9465796°E		
	Unknown			End of Victoria Harbour Promenade, Docklands 37.8188117°S 144.9342445°E		
	Unknown			1 Queensberry St, Carlton 37.805292°S 144.9688233°E		
	Unknown			450 St Kilda Road 37.8387663°S 144.9760745°E		

== See also ==
- Street art in Melbourne
- List of Art Deco buildings in Melbourne
