= Geoffrey Bartlett =

Australian sculptor

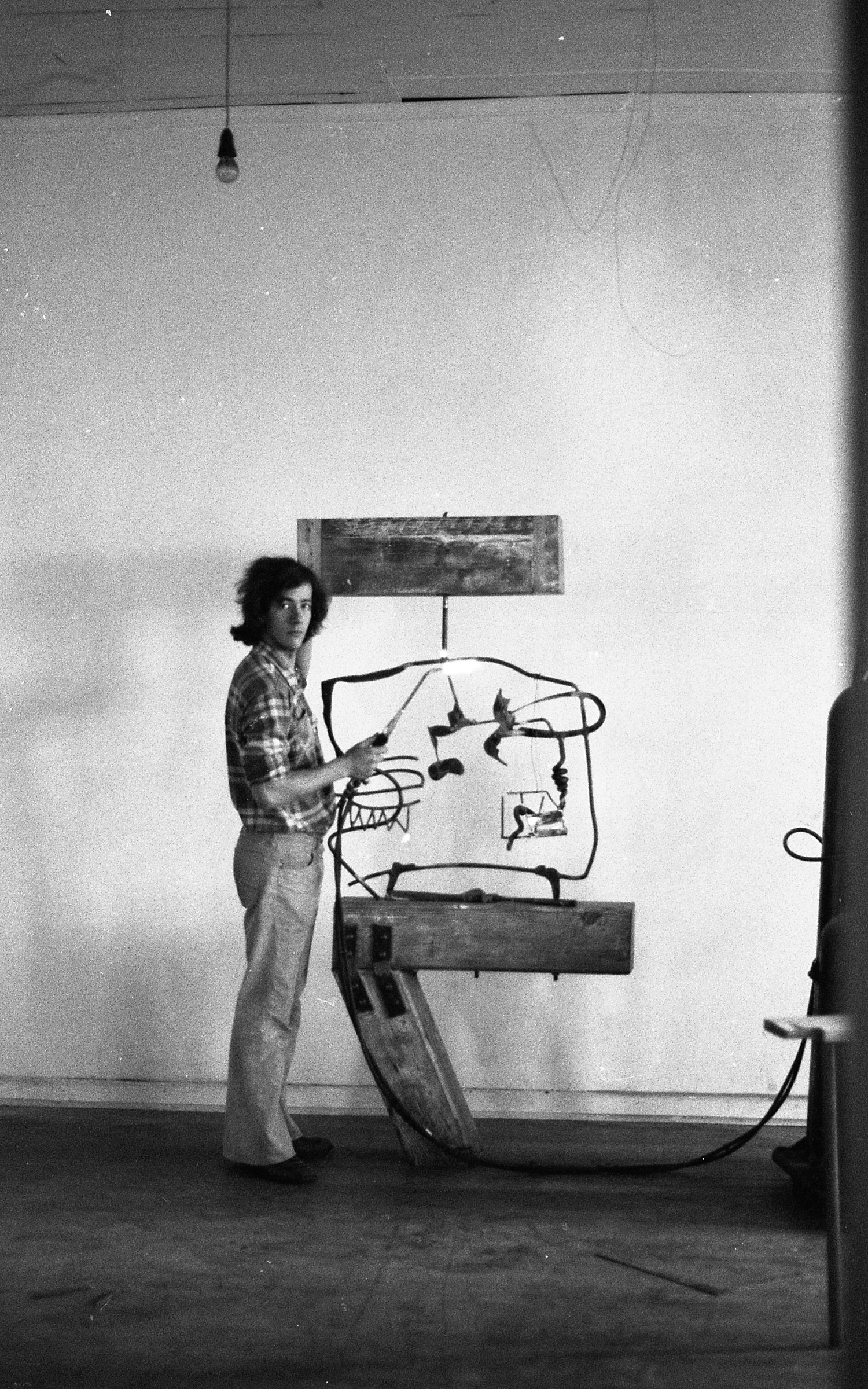
- Photo of Artist in his Fitzroy Studio, 1974
- Born: 1952 (age 73–74); Melbourne, Victoria, Australia
- Education: Diploma of Fine Art (1973) and Post-graduate Diploma Sculpture (1975) Royal Melbourne Institute of Technology, Master of Fine Arts (Hons) at Columbia University (1985)
- Known for: Sculpture
- Notable work: The Messenger (1983); Aurora (2005)
- Awards: Ian Potter Foundation Sculpture Award (1982), Harkness Fellowship, Helen Lempriere National Sculpture Award
- Website: http://www.geoffreybartlett.com

Geoffrey Bartlett is an Australian sculptor working in Melbourne. Since starting out in 1973, Bartlett's career in sculpture spans more than 50 years. He is known for both his studio-based works and major public commissions in sculpture. Bartlett's work has been noted for its contribution to modern Australia sculpture. In 2007, the National Gallery of Victoria held a major retrospective on Bartlett's work since 1987.

== Biography ==
=== Early life and education ===
Bartlett was born in Melbourne in 1952 and grew up in country Victoria. He grew up in Warrnambool and spent his teenage years in Shepparton.

His father was the manager of Maples, the old furniture shop. Bartlett would enjoy tinkering and building with timber from crates that his father would bring home from his job.

While in Shepparton High School, Bartlett was introduced to bronze casting by Phillip Cannizzio, a local sculptor. Cannizzio and Bartlett would cast bronze pieces at the J.Furphy and Sons engineering works. Cannizzio's example gave young Bartlett the sense that a career as a sculptor was possible.

== Career ==
=== Early career 1973–1982 ===
After graduation in 1973, Bartlett set up a studio with Anthony Pryor and Augustine Dall'Ava at 108 Gertrude Street in the inner Melbourne suburb of Fitzroy. The three sculptors would share studios for the next 19 years.

In 1976, Bartlett had his first solo exhibition at the Ewing and George Paton Galleries at the University of Melbourne. The exhibition had been selected by Patrick McCaughey and curated under the directorship of Kiffy Rubbo, both of whom have launched the careers of young Australian artists.

=== New York 1983–1985 ===
The Harkness Fellowship allowed Bartlett to undertake a Master of Fine Arts (Hons) at Columbia University in New York. During this period in New York, Bartlett would construct more three-dimensional works, developing from his early works that were made to be viewed from a frontal perspective.

While in New York, Bartlett visited the major art galleries in New York and met sculptors such as Isamu Noguchi, Frank Stella and Clement Meadmore.

Bartlett cites David Smith, a well-known abstract expressionist, as a source of inspiration when starting out as a young sculptor. While in New York, he viewed Smith's work for the first time.

Victor and Loti Smorgan, who were philanthropists and patron of the arts, paid for the shipping of Bartlett's 17 sculptures back to Australia. The works from New York were subsequently exhibited at the Pinacotheca in 1986.

=== Present ===
Upon Returning to Melbourne, Bartlett established a studio in a former clothing factory in Collingwood to work independently as a sculptor. Bartlett would also resign from his full time teaching positions. Doing so allowed him to focus on his sculptural practice, in the same manner and intensity that he had been afforded in New York.

== Work ==
=== Major public commissions ===
Bartlett was awarded the Ian Potter Foundation Sculpture Commission in 1982. This would be his first major public commission. The sculpture entitled 'The Messenger' was installed in the front moat of the National Gallery of Victoria for twenty years, fronting St Kilda Road. The sculpture is currently installed in the Grimwade Gardens in the National Gallery of Victoria.

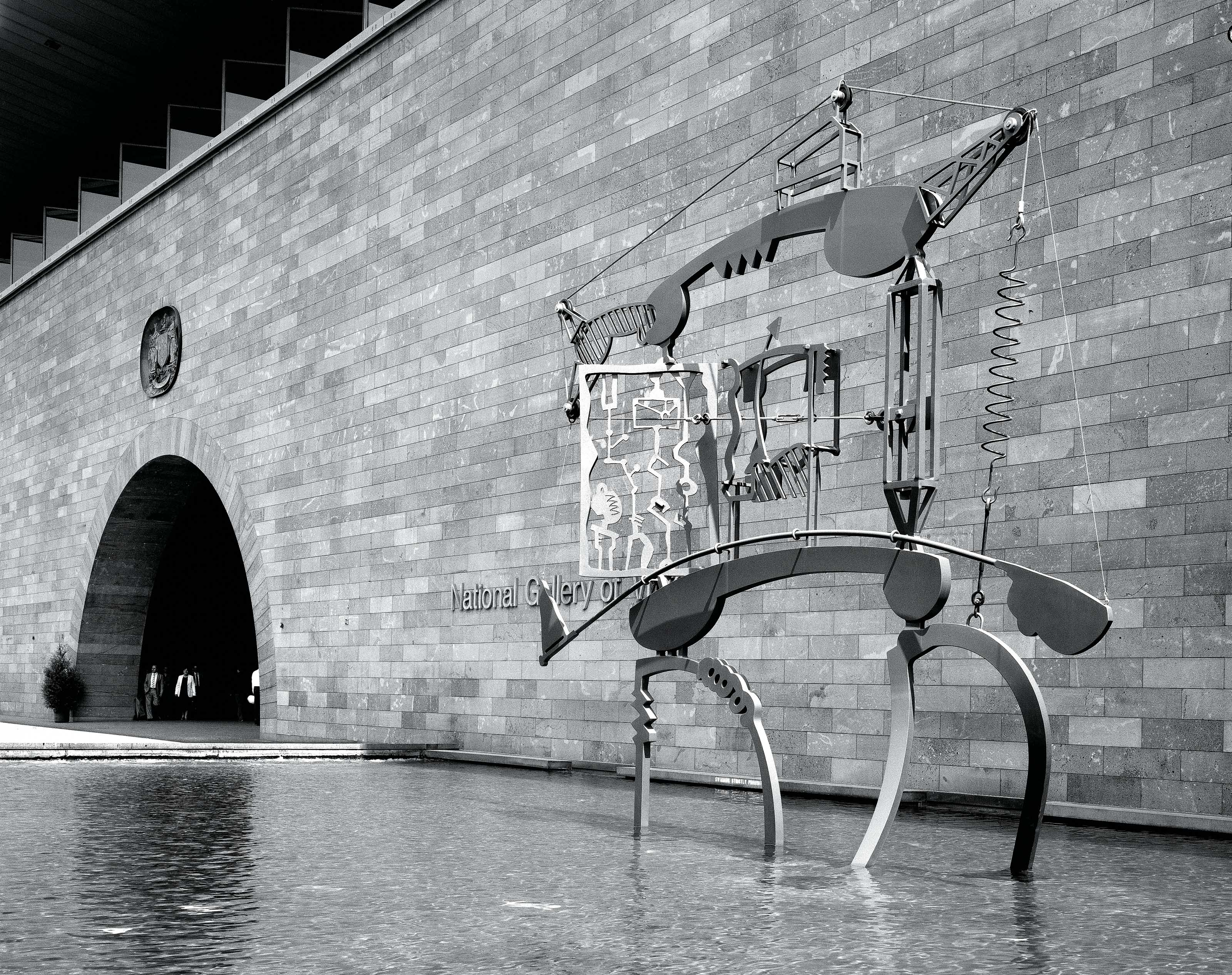
The Messenger, 1983

Canberra's Parliament House Program acquired two of Bartlett's painted steel sculptures that were made in New York, Two Points of View (1985) and Lessons in Gravity (1994). The two works face the Chambers of the House of Representatives and the Senate.

Melbourne City Council have commissioned two of Bartlett's sculptures. One of these commissions is Constellation (1996) that was a collaborative sculpture between Bruce Armstrong and Bartlett.

=== Responses ===
Bartlett's sculptures are described as volumetric and sensual. Bartlett's sculptures are characterised by attention to detail, surface finishes and means of assembly and disassembly of the work. His sculptures are able to suggest space, scale, movement, containment and time.

== Gallery ==
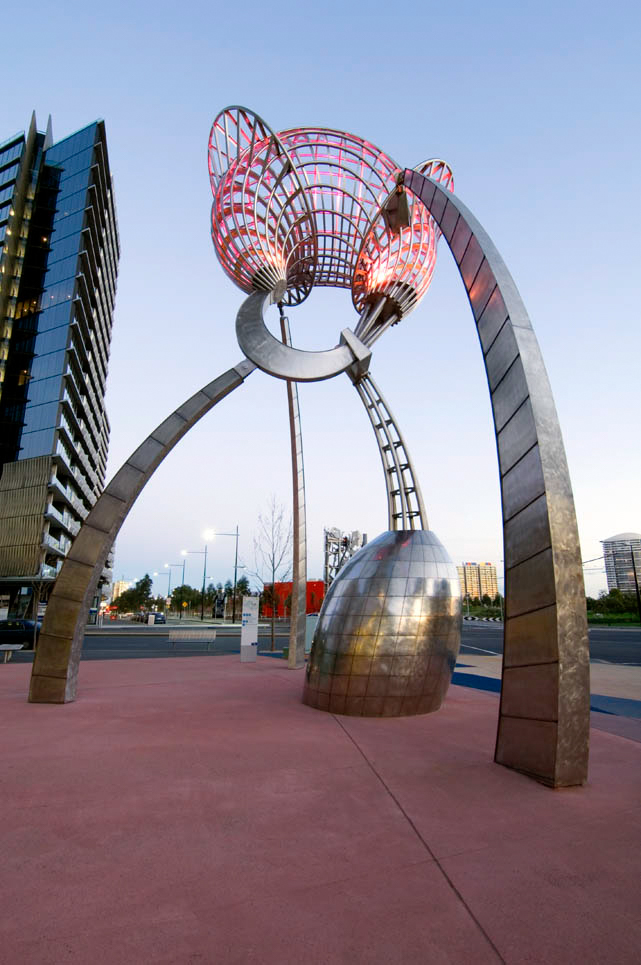
Aurora, 2003

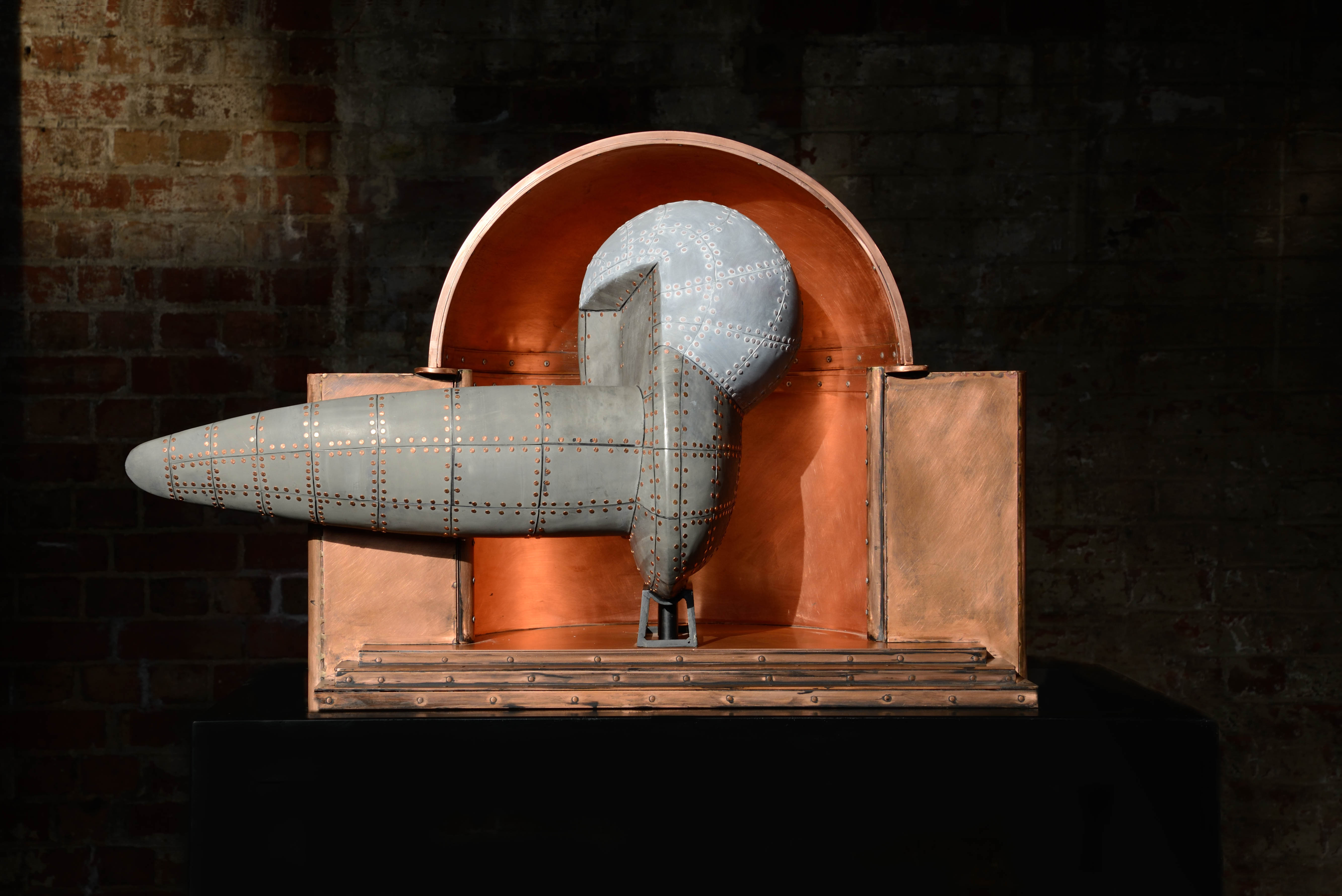
Flight from the Copper Temple, 2013/2014

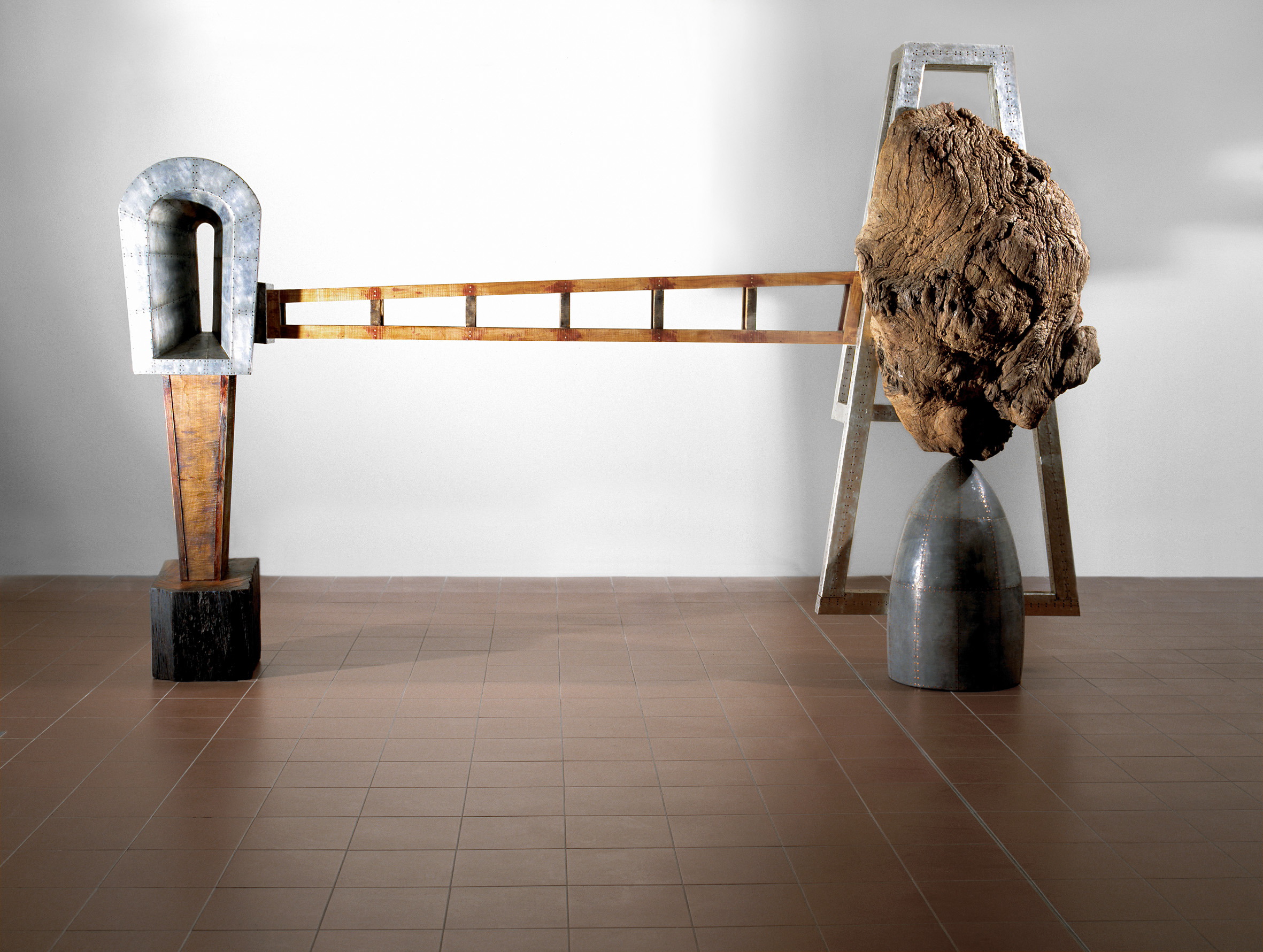
The Rose The Bullet The Window, 2001

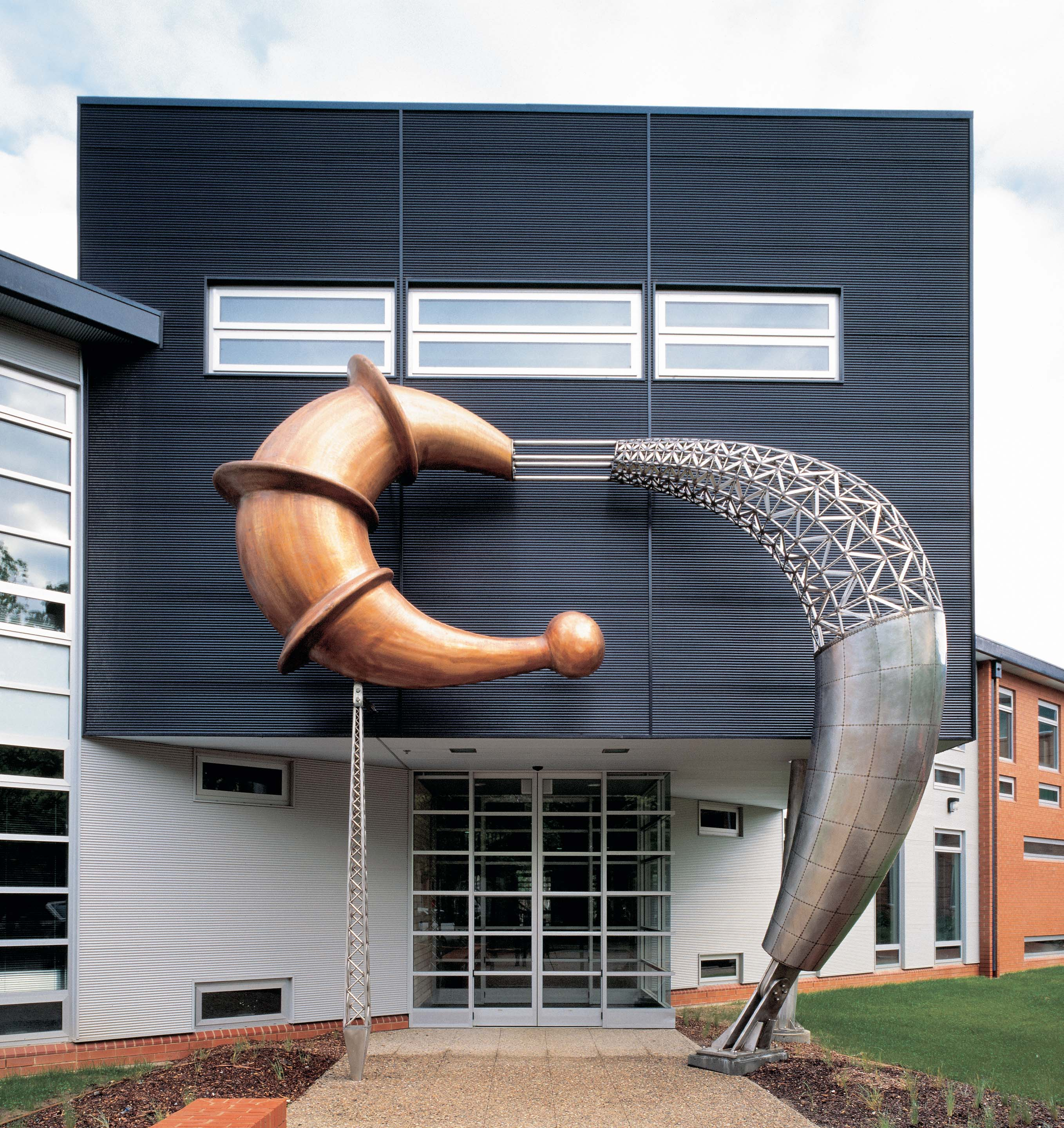
Fusion, 2000

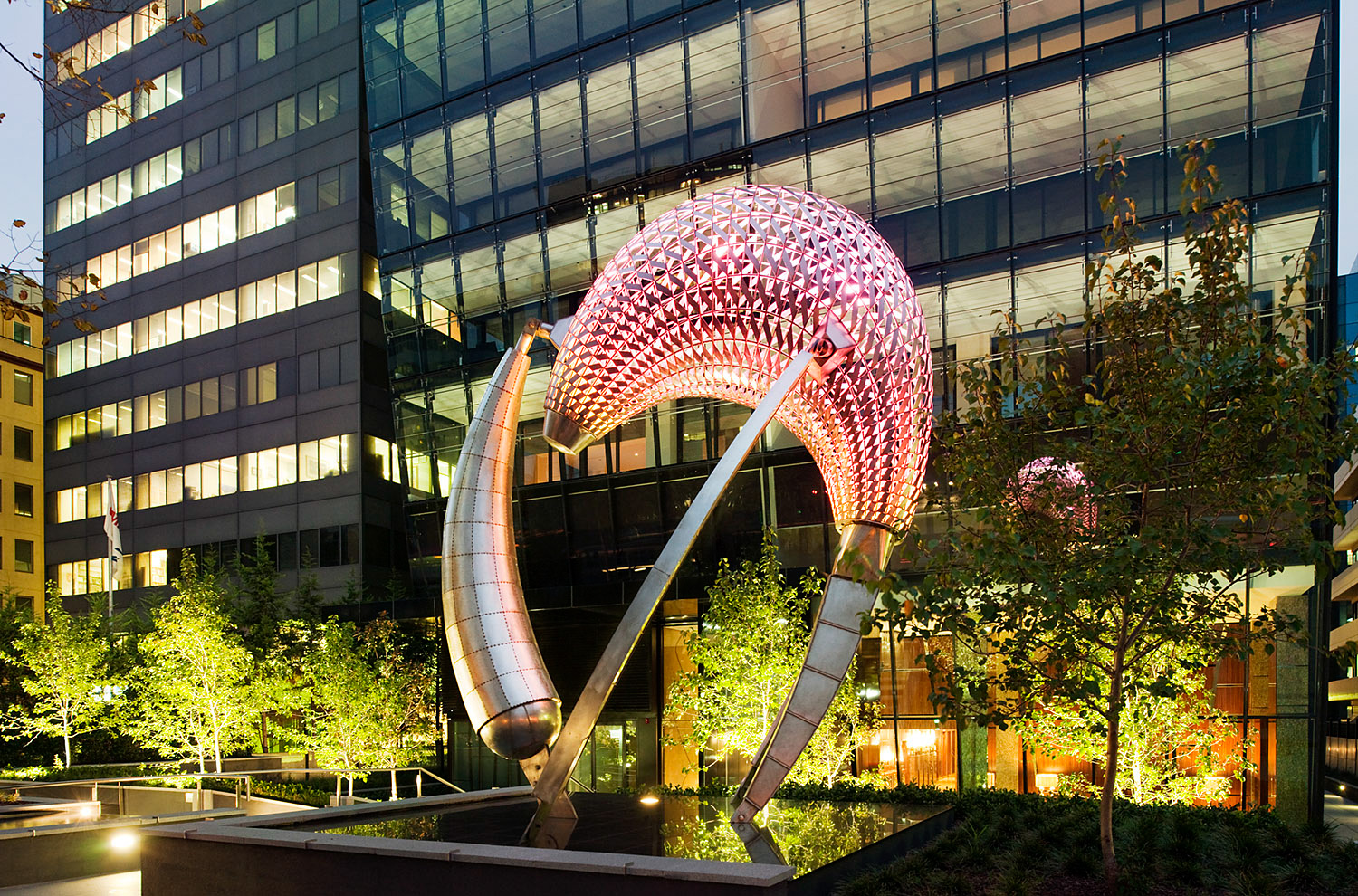
Orion, 2008

== Selected exhibitions ==
The following selection highlights the exhibitions that were held at key points during Bartlett's career as a sculptor.

=== Solo exhibitions (selection) ===
- 2019 ‘Geoffrey Bartlett’, Australian Galleries, Sydney
- 2017 ‘1988 – 2017 Revised’, Australian Galleries, Melbourne
- 2015 ‘Geoffrey Bartlett: 280205’, McClelland Sculpture Park and Gallery, Langwarrin, Victoria
- 2007 ‘Geoffrey Bartlett’, National Gallery of Victoria, Melbourne
- 2004 ‘Geoffrey Bartlett’, Drill Hall Gallery, Australian National University, Canberra
- 'Endangered Species’, Boutwell Draper Gallery, Sydney
- 2002 ‘Geoffrey Bartlett: The Shell’, fortyfivedownstairs, Melbourne
- 2001 ‘Geoffrey Bartlett: Silver Cloud’, Stonington Stables Museum of Art, Deakin University, Melbourne; touring to University of Technology Gallery, Sydney
- 2000 ‘Recent Sculpture’, Beaver Galleries, Canberra
- 1994 ‘Geoffrey Bartlett: Sculpture 1977-1994’, Waverley City Gallery, and touring to McClelland Sculpture Park and Gallery, Hamilton Art Gallery, Mildura Arts Centre, Latrobe Regional Art Gallery and Australian Galleries, Sydney in 1994-95
- 1993 ‘Woman: Sculpture and etchings’, Macquarie Galleries, Sydney and Australian Galleries, Melbourne
- 1987 ‘Painted bronze’, Pinacotheca, Melbourne
- 1985 ‘Geoffrey Bartlett’, Macquarie Galleries, Sydney
- 1981 ‘Sculpture’, Pinacotheca, Melbourne
- 1976, 'Geoffrey Bartlett', Ewing and George Paton Gallery, University of Melbourne, Melbourne, Australia

=== Joint exhibitions with Augustine Dall'Ava and Anthony Pryor ===
- 1987 ‘Recent Sculpture’, Anima Gallery, Adelaide
- 1979 ‘The Second and Last 108’, Gertrude Street Sculpture Show, Fitzroy, Melbourne
- 1978 ‘Made in Fitzroy: Exhibition 3: Three Australian Sculptors’, Queen Victoria
- Museum & Art Gallery, Launceston, School of Art, Hobart and Burnie Art Gallery
- ‘Recent Sculpture’, Watters Gallery, Sydney
- ‘Three Melbourne Sculptors’, Solander Gallery, Canberra
- 1977 ‘Sculpture Exhibition’, RMIT Gallery, Melbourne
- 1976 ‘108 Gertrude Street Studio Show’, Fitzroy, Melbourne Realities Gallery, Melbourne

=== Group exhibitions (selection) ===
- 2020 ‘The 9th Palmer Sculpture Biennial’, Palmer, SA
- ‘Melbourne Modern: European art & design at RMIT since 1945’, RMIT Gallery, Melbourne
- 2016 Sculpture by the Sea – Twentieth Annual Exhibition (Winner, Helen Lempriere Scholarship), Bondi, Sydney
- ‘Contemporary Small Sculpture Award’, Deakin University Art Gallery, Melbourne
- ‘Backward Glance: Important works from the 1980s’, John Buckley Gallery, Melbourne
- 2005 ‘National Sculpture Prize and Exhibition’, National Gallery of Australia, Canberra, and touring to Macquarie Bank offices in Sydney, Melbourne and Dell Gallery at Queensland College of the Arts, Brisbane
- 2004 ‘Shanghai Art Fair’, Shanghai
- 2003 ‘National Sculpture Prize and Exhibition’, National Gallery of Australia, Canberra
- 1996 ‘Sculpture Walk’, Royal Botanic Gardens, Melbourne
- 1988 ‘World Expo 88 Collection, Sculpture’ Southbank, Brisbane‘Collaborative Designs: Working Together with Architecture’, Meat Market Craft Centre, Melbourne
- ‘Pinacotheca Group Show’, Pinacotheca, Melbourne
- 1981 ‘First Australian Sculpture Triennial’, La Trobe University, Melbourne

== See also ==
- Patrick McCaughey
- Victor Smorgon
- Isamu Noguchi
- Clement Meadmore
- Bruce Armstrong
- Kiffy Rubbo
