= Architectural Fragment =

Sculpture in Victoria, Australia

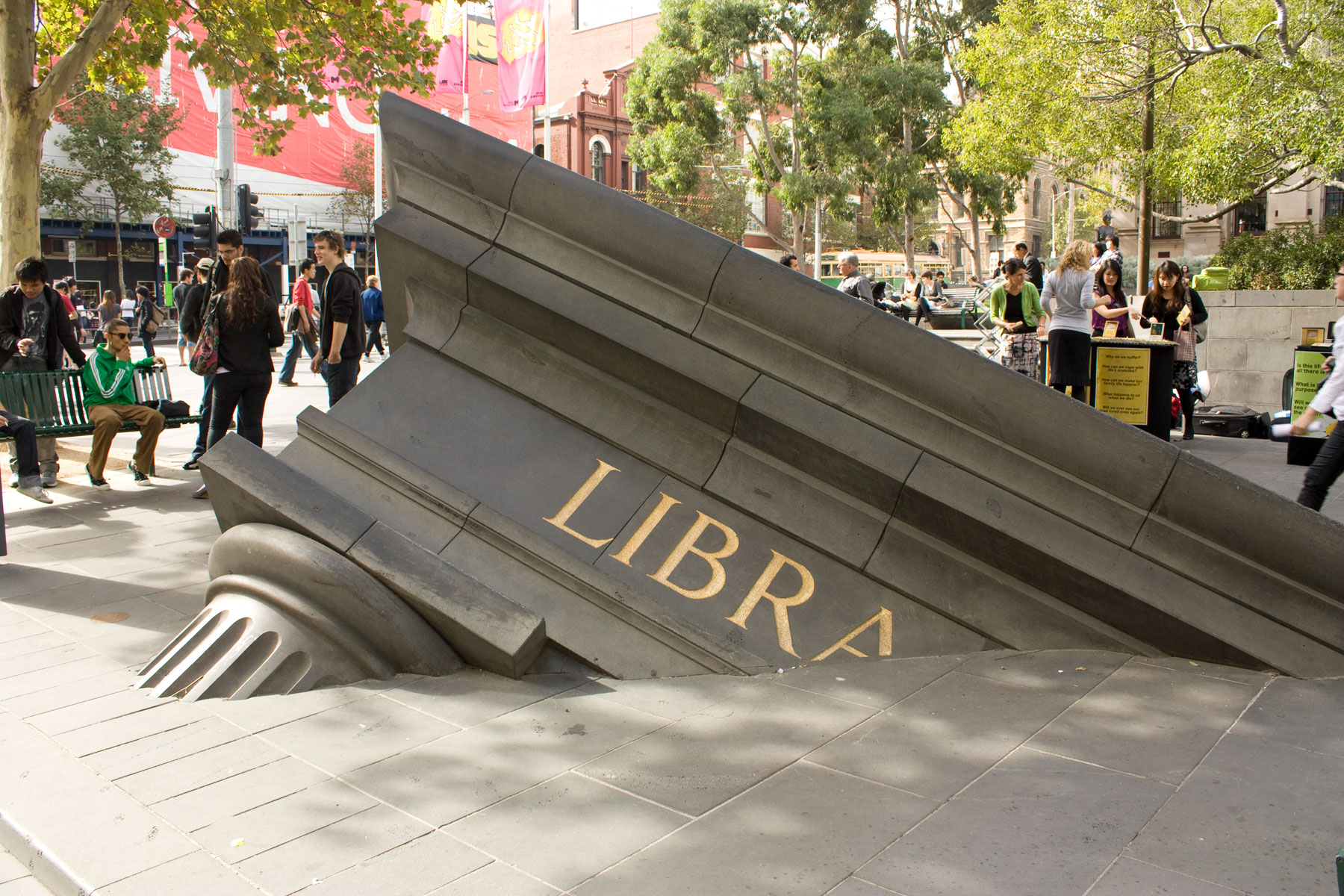
- Architectural Fragment photographed in 2010
- Artist: Petrus Spronk
- Year: 1992
- Medium: Victorian bluestone
- Location: State Library Victoria, Melbourne, Australia
- 37°48′35.4″S 144°57′50.6″E

Architectural Fragment (1992) is a bluestone sculpture by Dutch-Australian artist Petrus Spronk, installed as if it is buried in the pavement outside the State Library Victoria at the corner of Swanston Street and La Trobe Street in Melbourne, Australia. The sculpture represents a fragment of the library building emerging from the ground as if it were a long-buried archaeological artefact. The sculpture was commissioned for the Swanston Street Walk Public Art Project in 1992 and installed on 12 January 1993. It was partially inspired by the ancient architecture the artist observed when visiting the Greek island of Samos, where the mathematician Pythagoras was born, and by Percy Shelley's poem Ozymandias.

== Background and creation ==
In 1992 the City of Melbourne launched the Swanston Street Walk Public Art Project, closing a section of Swanston Street to vehicle traffic and commissioning contemporary art to add to existing sculptures. A budget of $250,000 was allotted to the project to create an outdoor art gallery in the interest of encouraging foot traffic in the city's central business district.

I met a traveller from an antique land
Who said: Two vast and trunkless legs of stone
Stand in the desart. Near them, on the sand,
Half sunk, a shattered visage lies, whose frown,
And wrinkled lip, and sneer of cold command,
Tell that its sculptor well those passions read
Which yet survive, stamped on these lifeless things,
The hand that mocked them and the heart that fed:
And on the pedestal these words appear:
"My name is Ozymandias, King of Kings:
Look on my works, ye Mighty, and despair!"
No thing beside remains. Round the decay
Of that colossal wreck, boundless and bare
The lone and level sands stretch far away.

— Percy Shelley, Ozymandias (1818)

Holland-born artist Petrus Spronk was introduced to the project when he saw a brief seeking public sculptures in The Age, a Melbourne newspaper. Spronk was inspired by time he had spent on the Greek island of Samos, the birthplace of Pythagoras, where fragments of ancient architecture lay strewn about the landscape in abundance, "like a free sculpture park". The sight evoked Percy Shelley's poem Ozymandias, another inspiration for the sculpture. Spronk chose to fabricate the sculpture from Victorian bluestone, the same material used to pave many of Melbourne's sidewalks, as it was a material he strongly associated with the area. The triangular sculpture was designed according to the Pythagorean theorem at a ratio of 3:4:5, and Spronk visited the intended site in front of the State Library Victoria to model the dimensions of the sculpture using pieces of string before filing an expression of interest and receiving the commission in 1992 with a budget of $83,000.

The sculpture was fabricated in Port Fairy from locally quarried bluestone over a three month period by stonemason Bernie Ryan and his team, based on concept drawings and a model created by Spronk. The sculpture uses a galvanised steel frame and an anti-graffiti coating.

The final sculpture was installed on the pavement outside the library on 12 January 1993. The existing bluestone pavers at the site were cut to allow the sculpture to fit precisely into the existing pavement. It was the first significant sculpture commissioned by the Melbourne City Council since the controversial 1978 sculpture Vault, also known as The Yellow Peril.

== Description ==
Architectural Fragment is a pyramidal structure resembling a fragment of a library building buried in the pavement, with the frieze partially inscribed with the word "library", gilded in gold leaf. Constructed from bluestone on a steel frame, it is inset into the surrounding bluestone pavers to appear as if it is emerging from the ground outside the State Library Victoria.

== Reception ==
Architectural Fragment was listed as one of the 20 most fascinating public sculptures in the world by Architectural Digest writer Nick Mafi in 2018, who wrote that it is "meant to symbolize the downfall of civilization, while alluding to the transience of the present". In 2023, Time Out ranked it among Melbourne's best public artworks.
