= Percival Ball =

English sculptor

- Born: 17 February 1845; Westminster, London, UK
- Died: 4 April 1900 (aged 55)
- Known for: sculpture
- Notable work: Phryne before Praxiteles

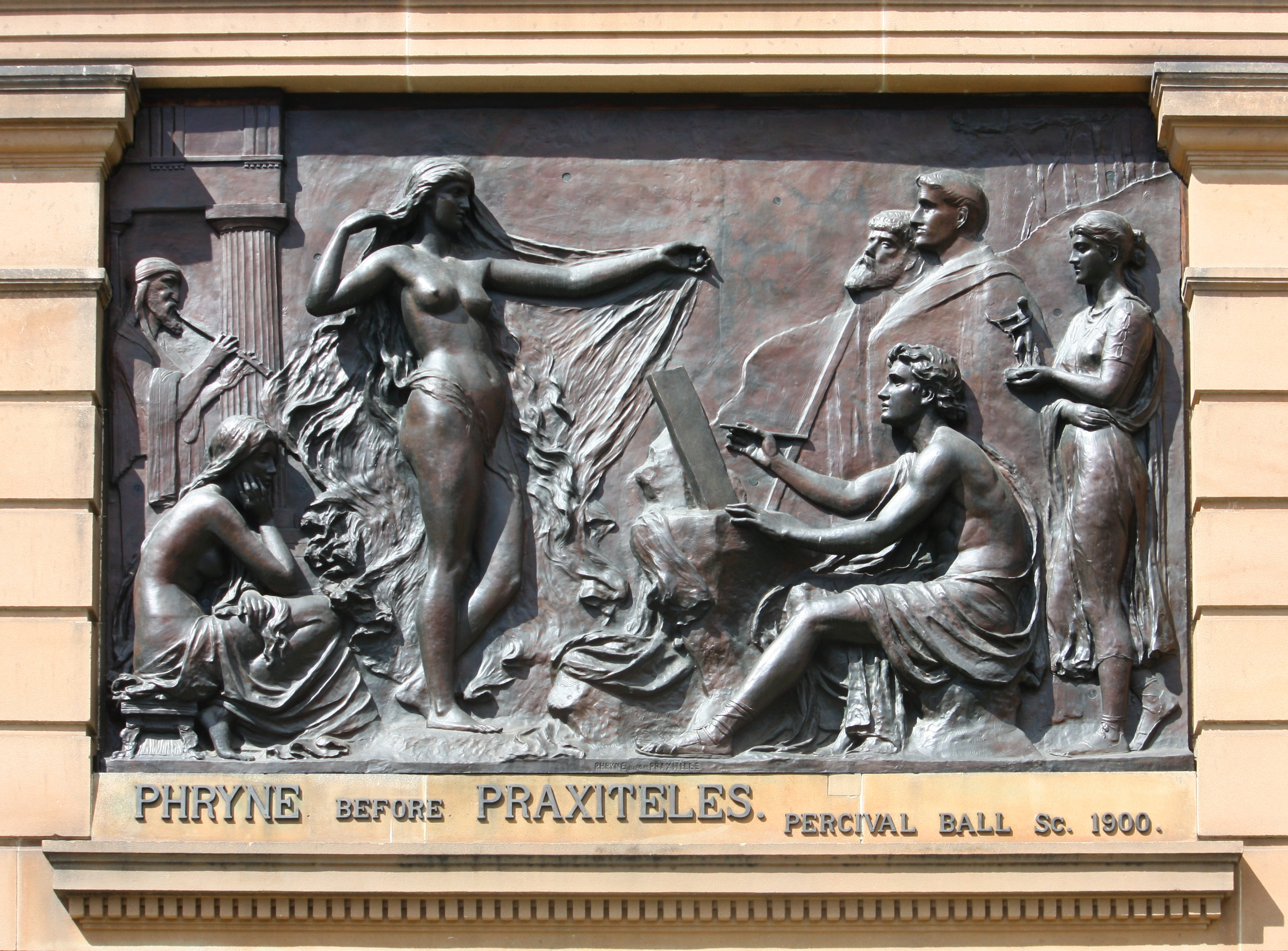
Phryne before Praxiteles, 1900. Bronze relief by Percival Ball on the facade of the Art Gallery of New South Wales.

Percival Ball (17 February 1845 – 4 April 1900) was an English sculptor active in Australia.

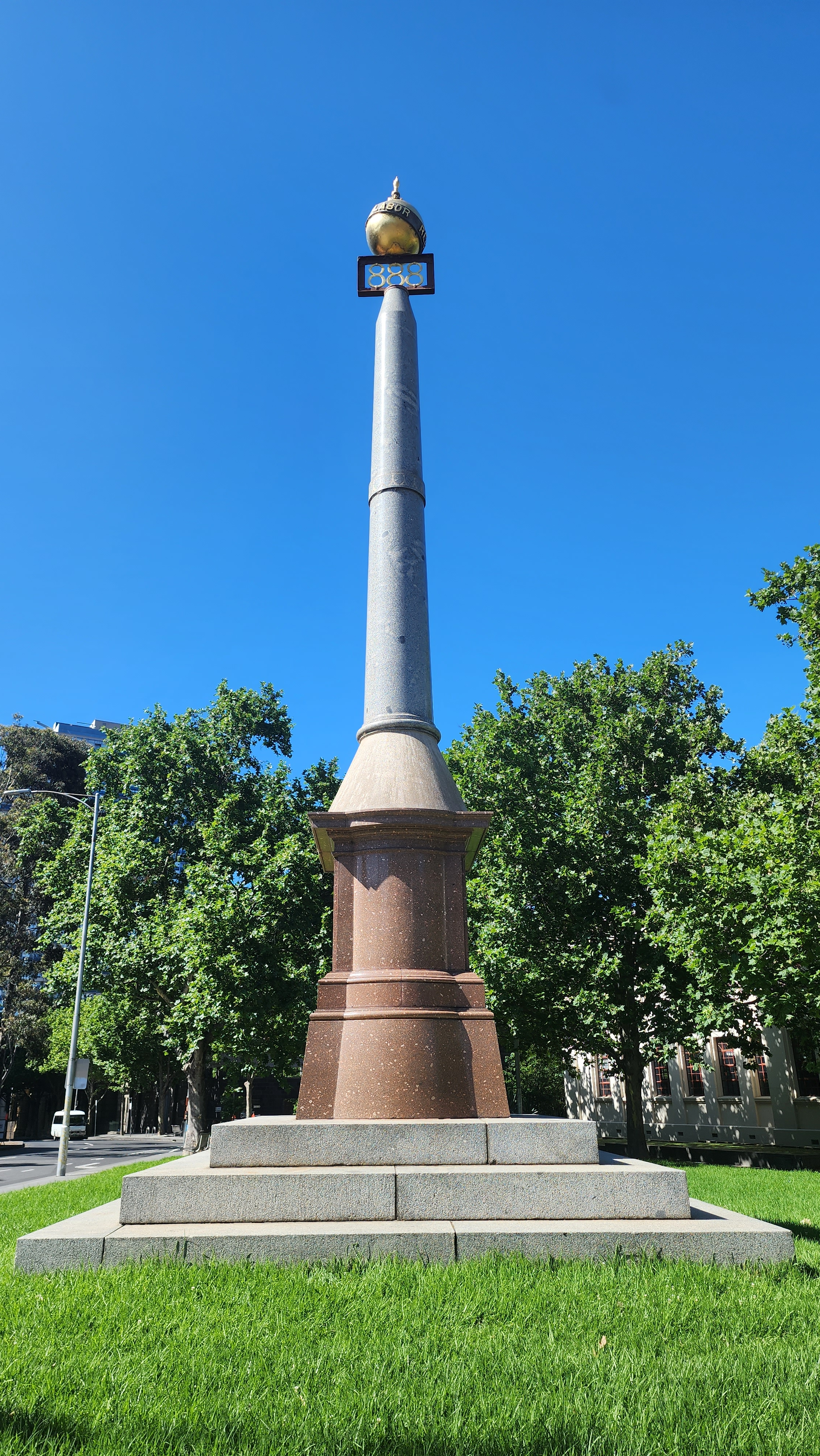
Eight Hour Day Memorial in Melbourne

Ball was born in Westminster, London, the son of Edward Henry Ball, carver, and his wife Louisa, née Percival. He later studied at the Royal Academy of Arts schools in England winning several gold medals and prizes. Between 1865 and 1882 he exhibited 24 works at Royal Academy exhibitions. Around 1870 Ball travelled to Paris and then to Munich and Rome, where he lived for approximately eight years. His marble sculptures received high praise.

Ball came to Sydney, Australia in 1884, seeking a warmer climate to relieve his asthma and bronchitis. After six months there he moved to Melbourne, occupying a studio at Grosvenor chambers from 1888.

He died of heart failure due to asthma and bronchitis in England in 1900.

== Gallery of work ==
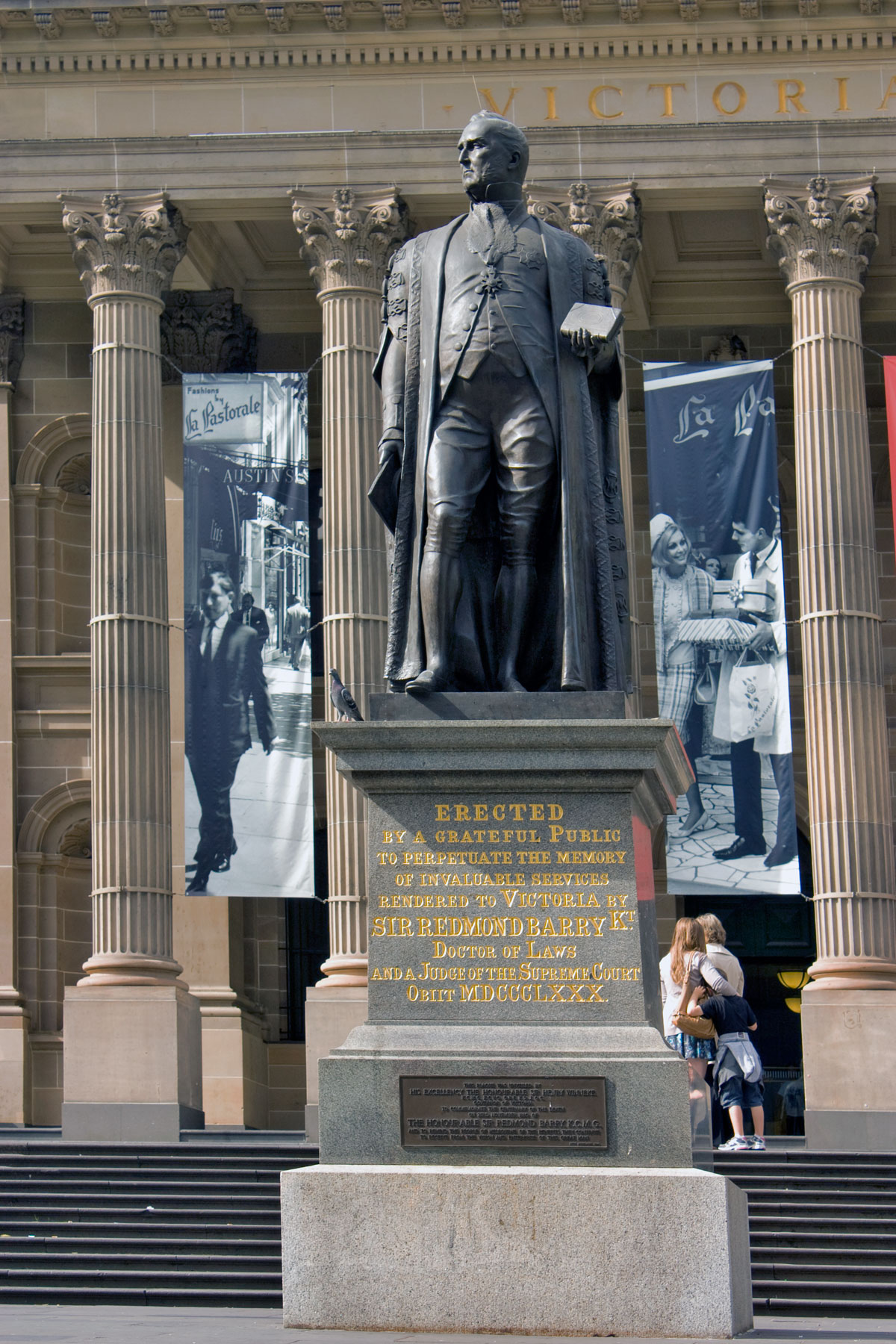
Statue of Redmond Barry, State Library of Victoria.

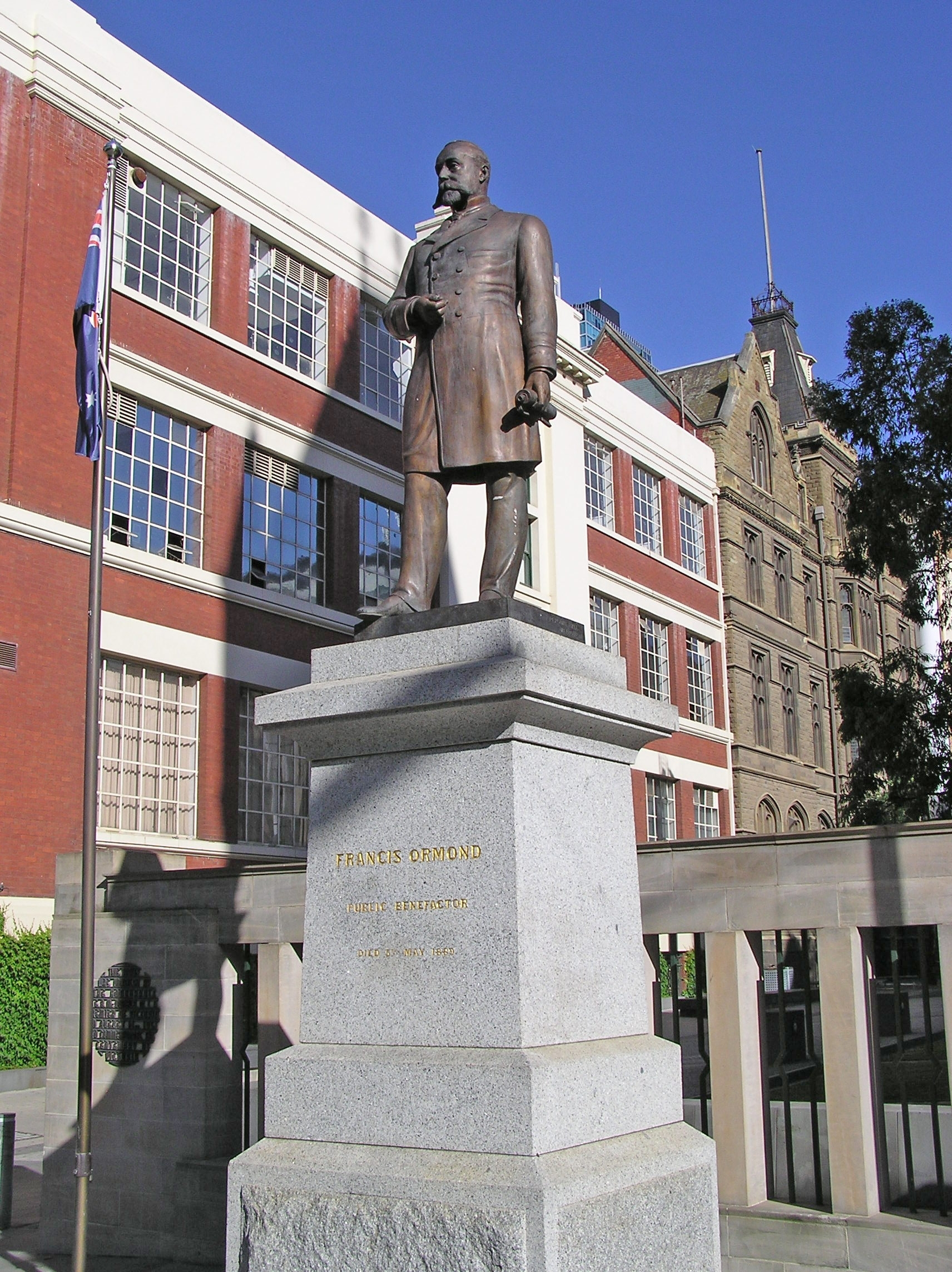
Statue of Francis Ormond by Ball on the Melbourne RMIT University City Campus.

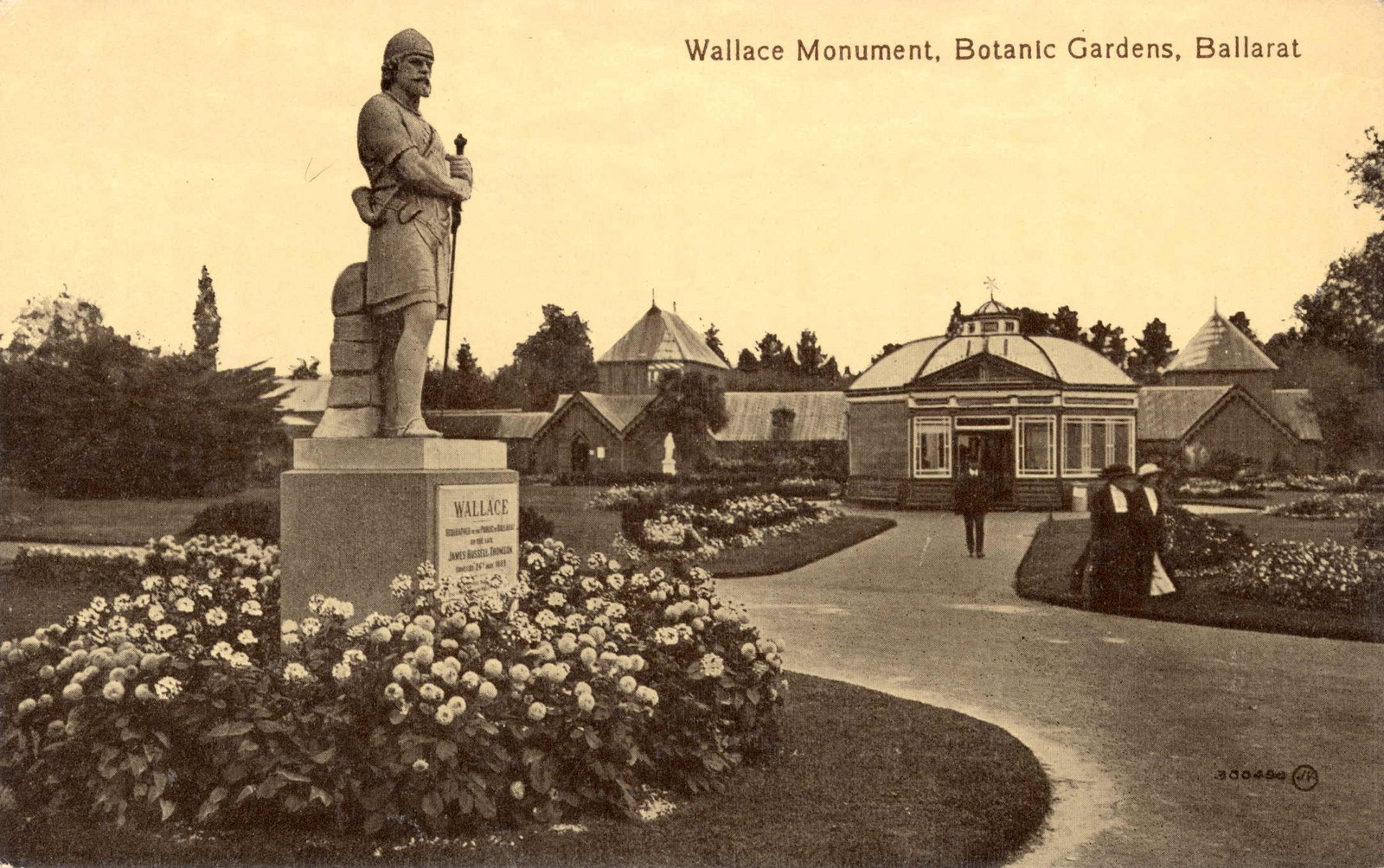
The marble sculpture Sir William Wallace, Ball. Unveiled 24th May 1889 at the Botanic Gardens, Ballarat.
