= Emily Floyd =

Australian sculptor (born 1972)

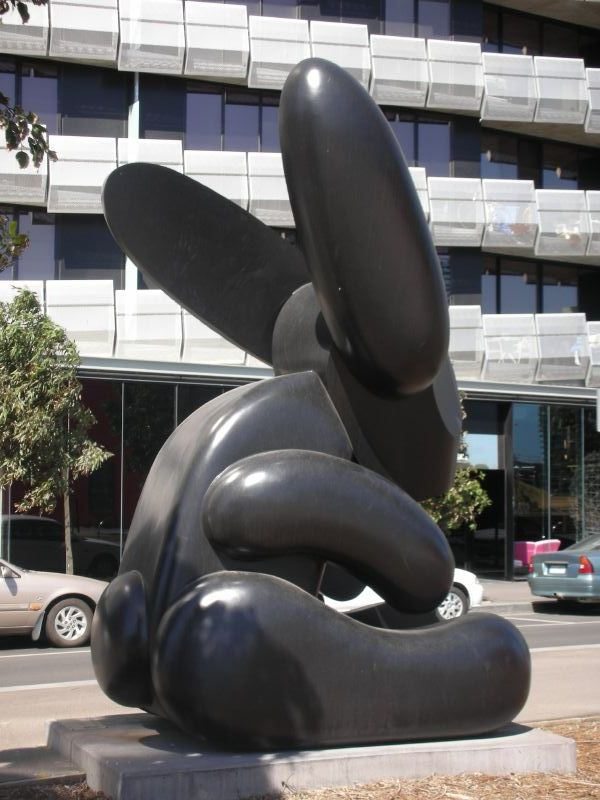
Signature Work, 2004 sculpture by Floyd (Docklands, Victoria)

Emily Floyd (born 1972) is an Australian artist working in public art, sculpture and print making. Her family were toy makers in traditional European styles — carefully crafted of wood. She learned the skills and use of machinery, which are reflected and used in many of her sculptural works. She has been commissioned to produce multiple public art sculptures in Melbourne and Sydney, Australia.

== Career ==
Floyd was born in Melbourne, Victoria in 1972. Her first tertiary studies were in psychology and sociology, and then she turned to graphic design and did some travelling. She returned to study metal working, and created large structures. In her mid-twenties she decided to go to art school. When she applied for art school she didn't know if she would study metal work or sculpture. The faculty announced that she was clearly a sculptor. She credits the various disciplines she worked in with giving her technical skills that helped her. Floyd continues to experiment with technologies in her studio.

Floyd qualified with a Bachelor of Fine Art, Sculpture degree in 1999 from Royal Melbourne Institute of Technology (now RMIT University), Melbourne.

Floyd is a senior lecturer in the Department of Fine Art at Monash University where her areas of research include the history of play. Other research may be artworks developed with others. An example is Open Space noted below.

Floyd works in two studios, for different media. She carves her sculptures in a backyard woodworking studio, using the machinery she inherited from her toy-making family. At the Abbotsford Convent complex in Melbourne, in a "clean" studio, she executes paintings, works on paper and print-making. She finds she works 8–10 hours in studio, and then must work on administrative matters with projects and art institutions.

== Works ==
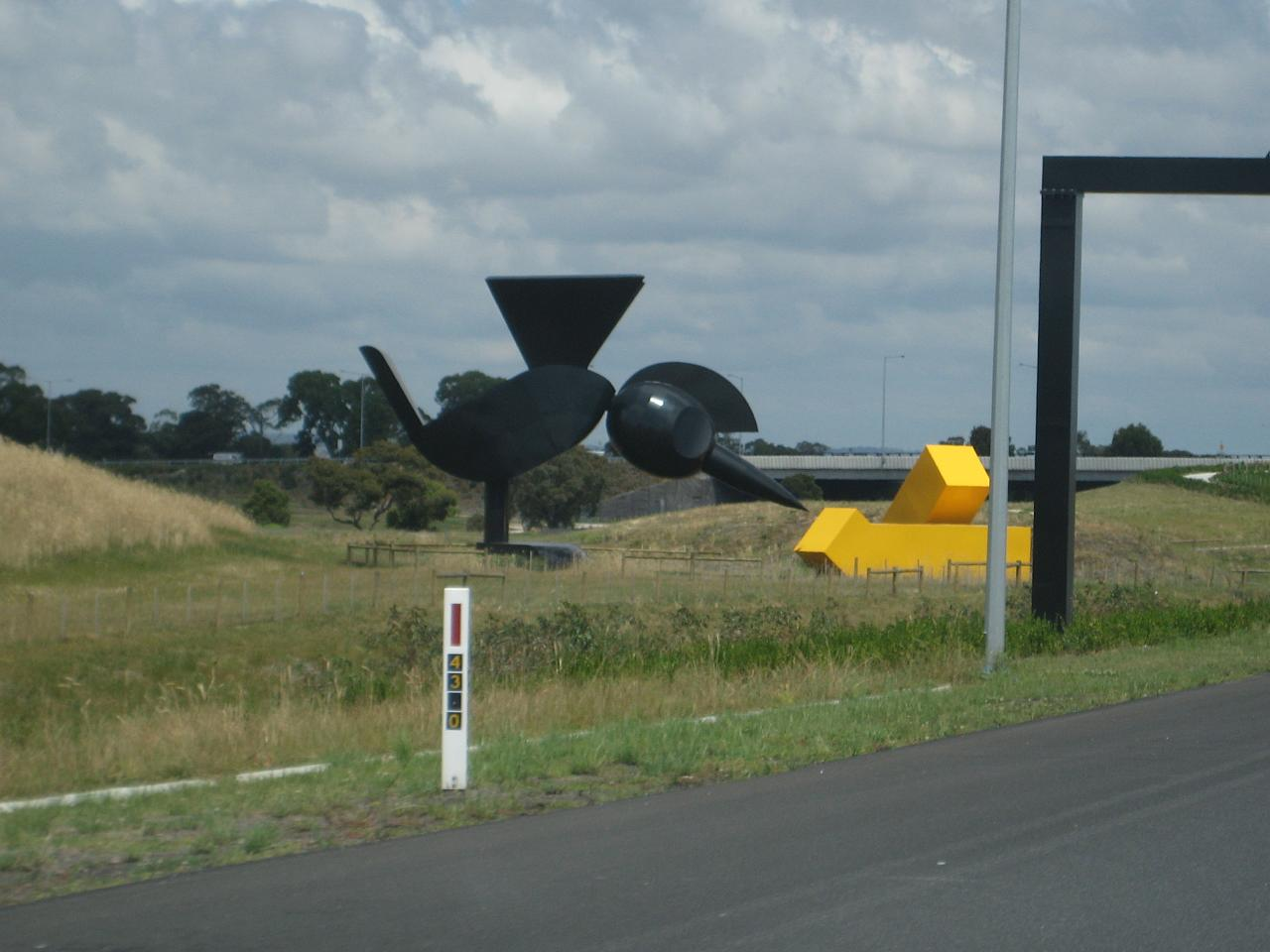
Public Art Strategy, 2004 sculpture by Floyd (Eastlink Motorway, Melbourne)

Floyd's paintings and works on paper often involve text with carefully chosen type fonts, colours and composition. These works invite discussion and focus on many political, cultural and social issues.

Many of her large scale sculptures evoke wooden children's toys. Floyd has completed several public art works in Melbourne including at the Docklands and for the Eastlink Motorway.

- Kesh Alphabet (visualisation) (2017), a digital collage including photograph by Max Dupain of the Art Gallery of New South Wales 1977. Exhibited in The National 2019 at the Art Gallery of New South Wales. Curated by Anneke Jaspers.
- Icelandic Puffins (2017), a sculptural installation in Divided Worlds, 2018 Adelaide Biennial of Australian Art.
- Garden Sculpture (2009), a sculpture in the collection of the Museum of Contemporary Art, Sydney 2010, purchased with funds provided by the Coe and Mordant families, 2010.

Floyd has also been influenced by philosophy, especially that of Hungarian Agnes Heller. (Floyd is of Hungarian background.) Floyd became drawn to Heller's writing on the social value of art. In February 2019 presented Anti-totalitarian Vectors at the Anna Schwartz Gallery in Melbourne. Floyd has been quoted as explaining this exhibition of multiple sculptures as a playful and inviting format for people, especially young people, to encounter philosophical ideas. The exhibition included painted balloons with quotes from Heller. Heller once wrote that philosophy is the Owl of Minerva. The exhibition was presided over by a large white owl with a lantern hanging off its beak.

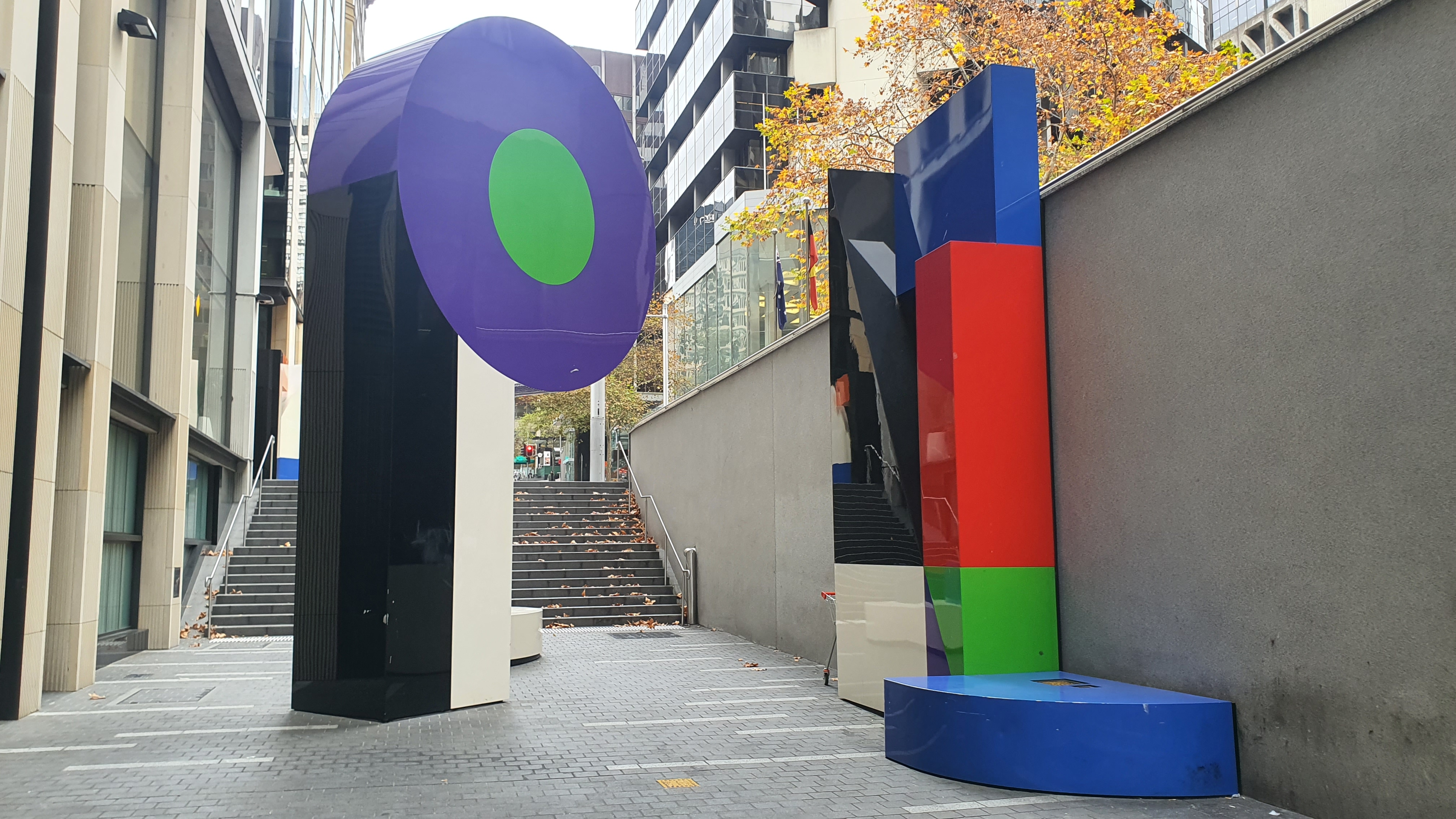
A part of Open Space! at the junction of George Street and Curtin Place, Sydney

== Public art commissions ==
Among her public art is a number of commissioned works.

In 2004 Floyd created Signature Work for the Docklands, Melbourne. The 4-metre high sculpture is both imposing and amusing. It is made of aluminium plate, coated in black polyurethan paint.

Also in 2004 Floyd created Public Art Strategy for the Eastlink Motorway sculpture park in Melbourne. It is along the Eastlink southbound carriageway between Cheltenham Rd & Dandenong Bypass.

Far Rainbow was a 2014 installation commissioned by Heide Museum of Modern Art, curated by Sue Cramer. A permanent outdoor sculpture Abstract Labour was also commissioned by Heide Museum of Modern Art as part of the exhibition, funded by the Victorian Government through Arts Victoria and the Victorian Public Sculpture Fund.

This place will always be open was a 2012 Ian Potter Sculpture Commission from the Monash University Museum of Art. This was the inaugural Ian Potter Sculpture Commission. She was inspired by the student struggles in the 70s and 80s at Monash, and the work serves as a place for social meetings and encounters. It is made up of sculpted letters, serving as benches. It was originally for the Caulfield Campus and later moved to the Clayton Victoria Campus. Due to building construction, it is temporarily de-installed.

In Sydney, Floyd developed Open Space which is installed in Curtin Laneway, next to an iconic mid-20th century building by the Austrian-Australian architect Harry Seidler.

== Exhibitions ==
- 2019 Anti-totalitarian Vectors, Anna Schwartz Gallery, Melbourne.
- 2014 The Dawn, National Gallery of Victoria, Melbourne

== Collections ==
- Art Gallery of New South Wales
- Heide Museum of Modern Art (Melbourne)
- National Gallery of Australia
- National Gallery of Victoria
- Queensland Gallery of Modern Art
