= Michael Meszaros =

Australian sculptor and medallist

Michael Victor Meszaros
- Born: 1945 (age 80–81); Melbourne, Australia
- Occupations: Sculptor, Medallist
- Website: meszarossculptor.com

Michael Victor Meszaros OAM (born 1945 in Melbourne, Australia) is an Australian sculptor and medallist.

== Life and career ==
Michael Meszaros is the younger son of Hungarian-born architect, sculptor, and medallist Andor Mészáros and his wife Elizabeth. He attended Preshil Margaret Lyttle Memorial School in Kew and Wesley College in Melbourne. During his school years, he received artistic inspiration from his father and learned craftsmanship skills, particularly in designing and crafting medals. In 1958, he collaborated with his father to create a medal for Australian philatelist and medal collector John Gartner (1914–1998).

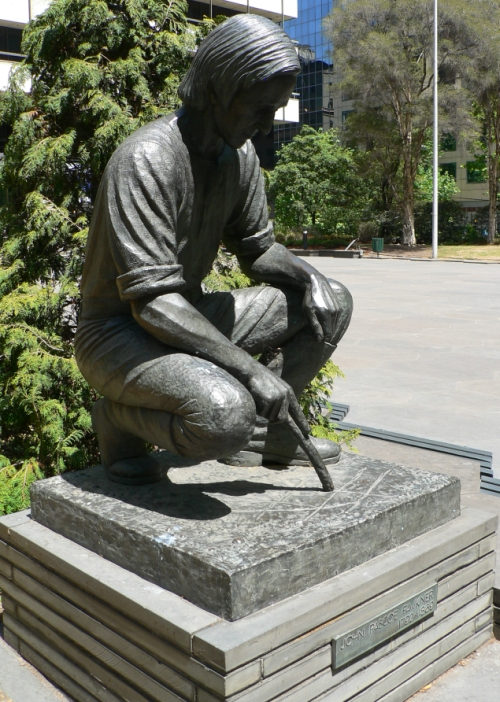
Statue of John Pascoe Fawkner

In the 1960s, he studied architecture at the University of Melbourne and graduated in 1968. He then spent a year in Rome on a Winston Churchill Memorial Trust Australia scholarship, studying metal sculpture and medal art at the Scuola dell’arte della medaglia. His thesis was the design of the series Twelve Signs of the Zodiac, which he completed upon his return to Melbourne. The twelve medals were sold to collectors and donated to the Melbourne Museum in 2011 by Jennifer M. Shaw.

Michael Meszaros worked as a sculptor and medallist in Kew in his father's workshop. As a sculptor, he created over 35 major commissioned works and more than 100 other pieces. His commissioned works include a bronze relief for the 100th anniversary of Charles La Trobe's death (1975) on the steps of Parliament House in Melbourne, a bronze statue of John Pascoe Fawkner (1978) at National Mutual Plaza, a monument for William Guilfoyle in the Royal Botanic Gardens of Melbourne, the bronze sculpture The Mayoress in Camberwell, a suburb of Boroondara City (1982), the groups Man and Lady and Mountain Cattleman (1996) in Mount Buller, a bronze sculpture for Sam the Koala (2011) in Mirboo North, Gippsland, and a bronze relief for Antarctic explorer Phillip Law. Michael Meszaros is the Vice President of the Association of Sculptors of Victoria.

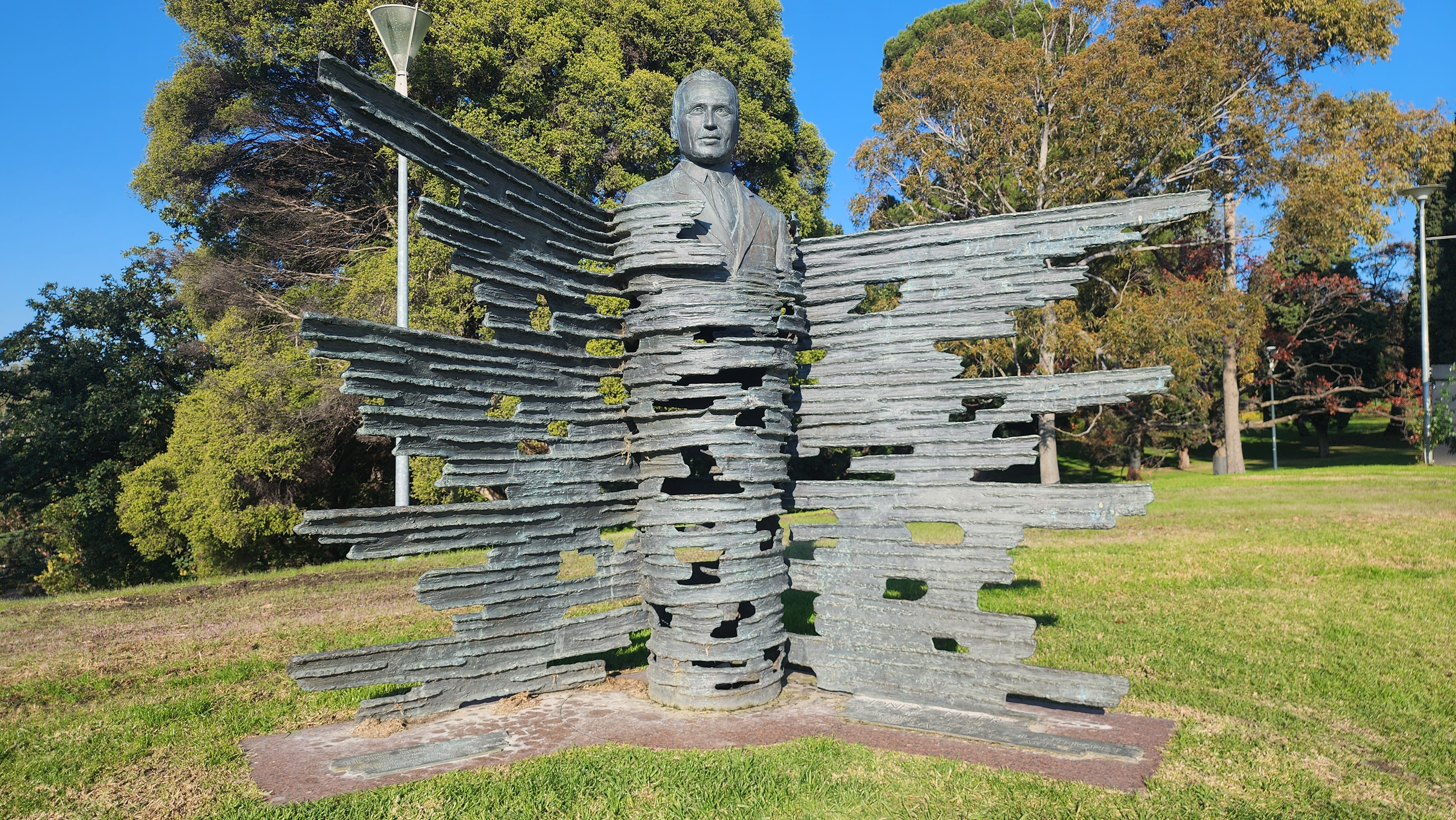
Sidney Myer's statue at Sidney Myer Music Bowl

In addition to his work as a sculptor, Michael Meszaros is best known as a medallist. He has designed and crafted over 500 medals, including those for the Royal Australian Mint, the Commonwealth of Australia. The Australian Bicentenary Medal, designed in 1988 to commemorate the 200th anniversary of the arrival of the First Fleet in Australia, was the second-largest issue in Australian history. For the University of Newcastle, New South Wales, he designed the Dunkley Medal for outstanding biomedical research. He has created portrait medals of art patron and diplomat Kenneth Myer, conductor Bernard Heinze, landscape architect Ellis Stones, botanist Carrick Chambers, and economist Ray Marginson. Medals by Michael Meszaros are housed in institutions such as the British Museum, the Royal Dutch Coin Cabinet, and private collections in Europe, America, Australia, New Zealand, and Britain.

Michael Meszaros is married and lives with his wife Elspeth in the Alphington suburb of Melbourne.

== Awards ==
- 2011: Numismatic Art Award for Excellence in Medallic Sculpture by the American Numismatic Association
- 2012: Medal of the Order of Australia for services to sculpture
- 2015: American Medal of the Year Award by the American Medallic Sculpture Association

== Publications ==
- The Meszaros family medal tradition. In: Journal of the Numismatic Association of Australia. Vol. 22, 2011.

== See also ==
- Meszaros Medals Collection, Museums Victoria
