= Will Ashton =

Australian artist (1881–1963)

Sir John William Ashton OBE
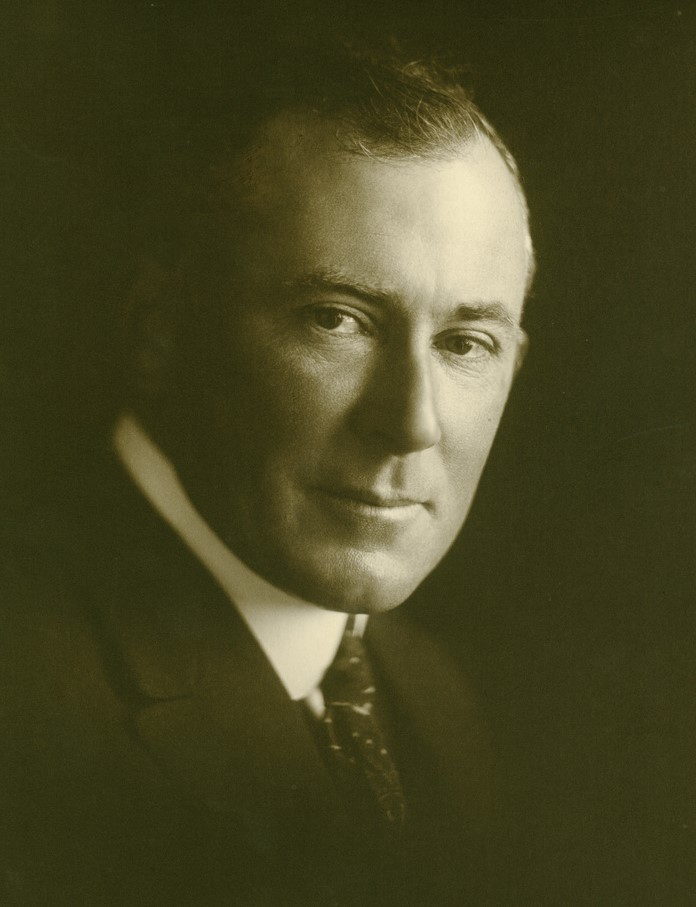
- Born: John William Ashton; 20 September 1881; Clifton, York, England
- Died: 1 September 1963 (aged 81); Mosman, New South Wales, Australia
- Education: Académie Julian
- Known for: Painter
- Movement: Impressionism
- Spouse(s): May Millman (m. 1906; die 1958) Winfreda Isabel Hoggard (m. 1961)
- Awards: Wynne Prize: 1908, 1930, 1939

Sir John William Ashton, OBE, ROI (20 September 1881 – 1 September 1963) was a prolific Australian Impressionist artist and director of the Art Gallery of New South Wales from 1937 to 1943.

== Early life ==
Ashton was born in Clifton, York, England, the only son of artist James Ashton, and his wife Mary Elizabeth Ashton. His father immigrated to Australia, arriving at Adelaide, South Australia in January 1884 and founding a school of painting in "unpretentious but commodious" premises on The Parade, Norwood in 1885. His wife and son arrived at a later date, but generally given as in 1884.

Ashton attended Prince Alfred College, where his father was art teacher, from 1889 to 1897. Neither academically nor athletically inclined. On leaving school, he received further training from his father; Hans Heysen was a fellow student.

He left for London in 1900, where he studied at the Olsson-Talmage studios, then in 1902 at the Académie Julian in Paris for a year. Ashton had several paintings accepted by the Royal Academy of Arts, London, and the Salon de la Société des Artistes Français, around which time he adopted the name "Will Ashton" to avoid confusion with his father or Julian Ashton (no relation). In 1905 he returned to Adelaide, where his "Boulevard Montparnasse, Paris" was hailed as a masterpiece, and purchased by the Art Gallery of South Australia. After holding exhibitions in Sydney, Melbourne, Perth and Adelaide, in 1908, he won the Wynne Prize for landscapes.

In the years 1912–1914 he painted in Britain, Europe, and Egypt. He returned to Australia for a year, but was back in London with his family 1915–1917. He made other trips in company with Lionel Lindsay or Charles Bryant and the Impressionist oil paintings he made on each of these trips sold well on his return to Australia. In particular, Ashton loved painting in France. His friend, Hans Heysen, wrote that the Seine had first 'captured his heart' during his student days, and the 'fascination of its swiftly running waters, its bridges, its barges and those remarkable rows of buildings broken by the trees that adorn both sides have never ceased to hold him and to draw him again and again to Paris'. He was retained as advisor to the National Gallery of South Australia and private collectors, and as examiner for the Royal Drawing Society. He won the Godfrey Rivers Bequest prize in 1933 and 1938. Ashton also won the Wynne Prize for a second and third time in 1930 and 1939.

== Later life ==
In 1937 Ashton was appointed director of the Art Gallery of New South Wales, and organised the NSW sesquicentenary exhibition of Australian art, which opened in February 1938. The gallery had been criticised for inadequate lighting, which he was able to address, but was constrained by the exigencies of wartime economy from much-needed extensions, and resigned in November 1943, but hung on as acting director for another six months. Applications for a replacement had been received from Rah Fizelle, Frank Medworth and Louis McCubbin. None was chosen; John Henry Young, director of the Macquarie Galleries was instead taken on in a temporary capacity until the appointment of Hal Missingham.

Ashton was appointed first director of David Jones Art Gallery in June 1944, which he ran until 1947.

Ashton was also:

- a member of the Royal Drawing Society
- a member of the Commonwealth Art Advisory Board from 1918 and chairman 1953–1962.
- a member of the Royal Institute of Oil Painters
- elected vice-president of the Australian Painter-Etchers' Society 1931
- member of the Society of Artists in Sydney

Ashton died of cancer at his home in Mosman, New South Wales.

== Recognition ==
He was awarded the (Sydney) Society of Artists' medal in 1944.

Ashton was appointed an Officer of the Order of the British Empire on 1 January 1941 and was made a Knight Bachelor on 11 June 1960 for his service as chairman of the Commonwealth Art Advisory Board.

A portrait of Ashton by William Dargie was purchased by the Commonwealth government for the National Portrait Gallery.

His paintings are held by the National Gallery of Australia, the Art Gallery of South Australia, the National Gallery of Victoria, and the Queensland Art Gallery.

== Family ==
On 31 January 1906 Ashton married May Millman (1880–1958), one of his students, at Christ Church, North Adelaide. They had three sons:

- Adrian Olsson Ashton CBE (9 November 1906 – 1982) was a leading architect in Sydney.
- Colin Millman Ashton (5 August 1911 – 24 April 2003), died in Waverton, New South Wales.
- Basil York Ashton, (23 May 1919 – 3 April 1987) born in Chatswood, New South Wales lived in Clontarf, New South Wales.

He married again, to the widow Winfreda Isabel "Freda" Hoggard, née Luxmoore, (1904 – 9 May 1989), on 6 February 1961. She was murdered on Military Road, Mosman by serial killer John Wayne Glover.

Ashton's only sibling was a sister, Edith Ashton (born 1887), who married Ernest Anthoney (died 1961) on 22 December 1909.

Cultural offices
Preceded by James Macdonald	Director and Secretary of the National Art Gallery of New South Wales; 1937–1943	Succeeded by John Henry Young as temporary appointment
