= Loudon Sainthill =

Australian artist (1918–1969)

Loudon Sainthill (9 January 1918 – 10 June 1969) was an Australian artist and stage and costume designer. He worked predominantly in the United Kingdom, where he died. His early designs were described as 'opulent', 'sumptuous' and 'exuberantly splendid', but there was also a 'special quality of enchantment, mixed so often with a haunting sadness'.

== Career ==
He was born Loudon St Hill, the second of four children, in Hobart, Tasmania, but by the age of two his family had moved to Melbourne. He had a stammer from an early age. This continued into his adulthood, but was not apparent when talking to children. He had little formal schooling. He had a natural interest in drawing and painting, and was attracted to quality live performance. Before the age of 14 he had seen Anna Pavlova dance, heard Dame Nellie Melba sing, and had seen Ibsen and Chekhov plays performed. In 1932 he studied design and drawing under Napier Waller at the Applied Arts School of the Working Men's College (a precursor of RMIT University). By age 17 he had set up a studio in the heart of Melbourne where he painted and sold murals. By 1935 he had changed the spelling of his surname to Sainthill.

Around this time he met the journalist, book seller, art critic and leading member of the avant garde scene Harry Tatlock Miller (1913–1989). They were to become life partners, and Miller's connections were to prove advantageous to Sainthill's career. Miller published an art magazine called Manuscripts, and he organised Sainthill's first exhibition, at the Hotel Australia in Collins Street.

In 1936–37, 1938–39 and 1940, his artistic eyes were opened by seeing Colonel W. de Basil's Original Ballet Russe on their three Australian tours. He and Miller were regular patrons of Café Petrushka on Little Collins St, where they mingled with fellow members of the artistic and bohemian community, and they had the chance to meet some of the visiting Russian dancers. He painted some of the dancers and designed some sets for the ballets. He was approached to design Serge Lifar's Icare, but although Sidney Nolan was given the commission, Sainthill's consolation prize was being invited to London with the company. There, with the assistance of Rex Nan Kivell, he mounted an exhibition of his pictures in 1939, and almost all the 52 pieces sold. The British Council then sent Sainthill and Miller back to Australia, in charge of a major exhibition of theatre and ballet designs, which opened in Sydney in early 1940. He also designed the costume for Nina Verchinina's character in the farewell performance by the Ballet Russe in Melbourne in September 1940, the ballet Dithyramb, to music by Margaret Sutherland.

In 1941 he designed the costumes for a Melbourne production by Gregan McMahon of Jean Giraudoux's Amphitryon 38 and the sets for some of Hélène Kirsova's ballets, A Dream – and a Fairy Tale, Faust, Les Matelots and Vieux Paris.

In 1942 he and Miller joined the Australian Imperial Force and served as theatre orderlies on the hospital ship Wanganella. On discharge in 1946, they joined some like-minded artists and bohemians at Merioola, Edgecliff, Sydney. These included Alec Murray, Jocelyn Rickards, Justin O'Brien and Donald Friend. They came to be known as the Merioola Group.

He created 'A History of Costume from 4000 B.C. to 1945 A.D.', a series of water colours, which were bought by public subscription and presented to the Art Gallery of New South Wales. In 1947–48 he designed books for the antipodean tours by the Ballet Rambert and The Old Vic Theatre Company, and held two one-man exhibitions at the Macquarie Galleries. Laurence Olivier, touring with Vivien Leigh for The Old Vic, was particularly impressed with Loudon Sainthill's work, and promised to help him in London.

Sainthill and Miller returned to England in 1949. In 1950 he was engaged by Robert Helpmann to design the décor for Ile des Sirènea for its forthcoming tour with Helpmann and Margot Fonteyn. Helpmann's partner, the theatre director Michael Benthall, noticed his work, and commissioned him to design The Tempest for the Shakespeare Memorial Theatre, Stratford-upon-Avon, which opened on 26 June 1951, the cast including Richard Burton, Alan Badel, Michael Redgrave, Hugh Griffith, Rachel Roberts, Barbara Jefford and Ian Bannen. This opened up many doors for Sainthill. In 1952 he designed for the Shakespeare Memorial Theatre's production of Richard II at the Lyric Theatre in Hammersmith, London, with a cast that included Paul Scofield, Eric Porter and Herbert Lomas, directed by John Gielgud. In 1953 there were the designs for George Bernard Shaw's The Apple Cart at the Haymarket, London, and Oscar Wilde's A Woman of No Importance at the Savoy.

In 1954, when Marc Chagall suddenly withdrew from the project, Sainthill was engaged at short notice to design the sets and costumes for Robert Helpmann's production of Nikolai Rimsky-Korsakov's opera Le Coq d'Or at the Royal Opera House, Covent Garden. In 1955 there was Othello for the Old Vic. In 1955 he was a member of the costume and wardrobe department for the ballet sequence in the film The Man Who Loved Redheads. In 1958 came Shakespeare's Pericles, Prince of Tyre, directed by Tony Richardson. Harold Hobson called Sainthill's design "a rich, scenic orgy of ropes, sails, ships, bawdy houses and barbaric palaces". Kenneth Tynan was profoundly impressed, not just with Roberto Gerhard's music but also with Sainthill's set design, which he called "pictorially magnificent, a restless Oriental kaleidoscope …". Other critics were less impressed. One wrote "Tony Richardson, Loudon Sainthill and Roberto Gerhard combine to make an assault of barbaric ferocity on our senses". Another opined, "Richardson and Sainthill dressed up the mouldy tale like some gargantuan dog's dinner".

In 1958–59 came the pantomimes Cinderella and Aladdin, and work on more films, such as set decorator for Expresso Bongo (1958), and interior set designer for Look Back in Anger (1959). He designed the musicals Half a Sixpence (1963) and Canterbury Tales (1967). His Canterbury Tales costume designs won him a Tony Award when the show played on Broadway in 1969. He was also nominated in the same category in 1966 for The Right Honourable Gentleman.

He designed over 50 major productions in all, up to four in a year, for directors such as Gielgud, Olivier, Helpmann, Richardson, Noël Coward, Joseph Losey and Wolf Mankowitz.

With Harry Tatlock Miller he produced books such as: Royal Album (1951), Undoubted Queen (1958) and Churchill (1959). There were also The Devil's Marchioness (1957), the Folio Society's King Richard II (1958) and Tiger at the Gates (1959).

Loudon Sainthill was a visiting teacher of stage design at the Central School of Arts and Crafts, London in the mid-1960s.

His final project was the designs for the dream sequence in Anthony Newley's film Can Heironymus Merkin Ever Forget Mercy Humppe and Find True Happiness?. He had just completed this work when on 10 June 1969 he died of a heart attack at Westminster Hospital; he was buried at Ropley.

== Legacy ==
A scholarship named after him in 1973 (the Loudon Sainthill Memorial Scholarship Trust) was established by Harry Tatlock Miller, and it assists young Australian designers to study abroad.

His work is held in the National Gallery of Australia, in many state and regional collections in Australia, and in the Victoria and Albert Museum, London.

In 1973, Bryan Robertson wrote and Harry Tatlock Miller edited, a memoir titled simply Loudon Sainthill (Hutchinson & Co Ltd, London, ISBN 9780091187309).

Sainthill's papers were donated to the National Gallery of Australia by Harry Tatlock Miller in 1989. He died later the same year.

A major retrospective of his work was included in the 1991 Melbourne International Festival of the Arts.

In 2013, the College of Arts and Social Sciences of the Australian National University was awarded a grant of $17,500 to publish the first illustrated book on Loudon Sainthill.
