= Judy Cassab =

Australian artist (1920–2015)

Judit Kaszab better known as Judy Cassab AO CBE
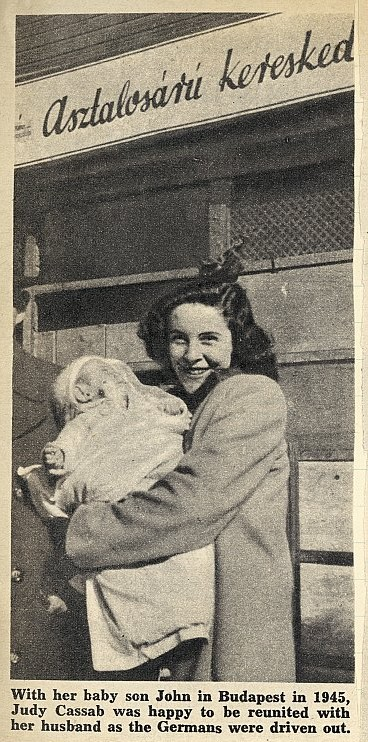
- From Cassab's scrapbook deposited in the National Library of Australia: With her baby son John in Budapest in 1945 Judy Cassab was happy to be reunited with her husband as the Germans were driven out
- Born: Judit Kaszab; 15 August 1920; Vienna, Austria
- Died: 3 November 2015 (aged 95); Randwick, New South Wales, Australia
- Occupations: Artist, writer
- Spouse(s): Jonchi Kämpfner, aka John Kampfner (married 1939)
- Children: Janos (John Seed, 1945) and Peter (1947)
- Website: judycassab.com

Judy Cassab AO CBE (15 August 1920 – 3 November 2015), born Judit "Juzi" Kaszab, was an Australian painter.

== Early years ==
Cassab was born in Vienna, on 15 August 1920 to Jewish Hungarian parents who separated in 1929 and she went to live with a grandmother. She began painting at twelve years old and began studying at the Academy of Art in Prague in 1938 but was forced to flee the German occupation in 1939. Cassab worked in a factory under an assumed name and put her artistic skills to use after hours forging papers and passports.

Her husband, chemical engineer–cum brewer Jancsi (elsewhere spelled Jonchi, later "John") Kämpfner (5 November 1902 – 19 April 2001), whom she married in 1939, was put in a forced labour camp by the Nazis in World War II, and returned to Hungary in 1944. Cassab and Kämpfner were assisted by his old employer, Count Schönborn, to gain a foothold in the art community of Vienna and won important portrait commissions through the Sekers family: Hugh Gaitskell and his family, John Profumo's wife Valerie Hobson, and Sir Ralph Richardson's wife Meriel Forbes.

Following important introductions from Lord Wilmot, Cassab, her husband and two sons emigrated to Australia in 1951 and settled in Sydney. Cassab became an Australian citizen in 1957. They lived at first with Hungarian refugees in Bondi and were admitted to the circle of artists that included Stanislav Rapotec, Donald Friend, Nora Heysen, John Olsen and Michael Kmit, and critic Paul Haefliger. Cassab and Kämpfner found a flat of their own, and while he worked to keep their little family, the "obsessive, selfish, single-minded artist" beavered away at her first solo exhibition, held in 1953 at Macquarie Galleries.

== Career ==
Cassab was the first woman to win the Archibald Prize twice:

- 1960 for a portrait of Stan Rapotec
- 1967 for a portrait of Margo Lewers.

She was commissioned by the Australian Mathematics Trust to paint a portrait of mathematician Bernhard Neumann.

She held more than fifty solo exhibitions in Australia, as well as others in Paris and London.

After Cassab's work was acquired by the National Gallery, she was interviewed by James Gleeson about how she captured people's character in their portraits. This interview later formed part of the James Gleeson Oral History Collection.

=== Solo exhibitions ===
- 1953 - Macquarie Galleries, Sydney
- 1953 - Macquarie Galleries, Sydney
- 1959 - Newcastle City Art Gallery
- 1959 - Crane Kalman Gallery, London
- 1963 - Macquarie Galleries, Sydney
- 1961 - Crane Kalman Gallery, London
- 1962 - Argus Gallery, Melbourne
- 1963 - Rudy Koman Gallery, Sydney
- 1964 - Georges Gallery, Melbourne
- 1964 - Von Bertouch Gallery, Newcastle
- 1917 - Skinner Gallery, Perth
- 1969 - Skinner Gallery, Perth
- 1971 - Rudy Koman Gallery, Sydney
- 1973 - Skinner Gallery, Perth
- 1973 - Reid Gallery, Brisbane
- 1975 - Von Bertouch Gallery, Newcastle
- 1976 - South Yarra Gallery, Melbourne
- 1978 - New Art Centre, London
- 1979 - Rudy Koman Gallery, Sydney
- 1990 - Masterpieces Fine Art, Hobart
- 1980 - Verlie Just Town Gallery, Brisbane
- 1981 - Australian Embassy, Paris
- 1981 - New Art Centre, London
- 1982 - Rudy Koman Gallery, Sydney
- 1982 - Greenhill Gallery, Perth
- 1982 - Greenhill Gallery, Adelaide
- 1983 - Von Bertouch Gallery, Newcastle
- 1984 - Verlie Just Town Gallery, Brisbane
- 1985 - Holdsworth Gallery, Sydney
- 1985 - Benalla Regional Gallery, Victoria
- 1985 - Hamilton Regional Gallery, Victoria
- 1985 - Caulfield Art Centre, Melbourne
- 1985 - David Ellis Gallery, Ballarat, Victoria
- 1987 - Holdsworth Gallery, Sydney
- 1987 - David Ellis Gallery, Ballarat, Victoria
- 1988 - S. H. Ervin Gallery, Sydney and Australian Regional Galleries
- 1988 - Brisbane City Hall
- 1988 - National Library, Canberra
- 1988 - Von Bertouch Gallery, Newcastle
- 1988 - Solander Gallery, Canberra
- 1989 - David Ellis Gallery, Melbourne
- 1989 - Verlie Just Town Gallery, Brisbane
- 1990 - Festival of Perth, Fremantle Arts Centre
- 1990 - Holdsworth Gallery, Sydney
- 1991 - David Ellis Gallery, Melbourne
- 1991 - Verlie Just Town Gallery, Brisbane
- 1992 - Freeman Gallery, Hobart
- 1992 - Schubert Gallery, Gold Coast
- 1992 - Solander Gallery, Canberra
- 1992 - Von Bertouch Gallery, Newcastle
- 1993 - Holdsworth Gallery, Sydney
- 1993 - Lyall Burton Gallery, Melbourne
- 1994 - Town Gallery, Brisbane
- 1994 - Solander Gallery, Canberra
- 1994 - Schubert Gallery, Gold Coast
- 1995 - Riverina Galleries, Wagga Wagga
- 1996 - Von Bertouch Gallery, Newcastle
- 1996 - Lyall Burton Gallery, Melbourne
- 1996 - BMG Gallery, Adelaide
- 1998 - S. H. Ervin Gallery, Sydney
- 1998 - Australian Galleries, Sydney
- 1999 - Stafford Studios, Perth
- 1999 - Von Bertouch Gallery, Newcastle
- 1999 - University of Sydney
- 2000 - Greythorn Gallery, Melbourne
- 2001 - Von Bertouch Gallery, Newcastle
- 2001 - Solander Gallery, Canberra
- 2001 - Australian Galleries, Sydney
- 2003 - Vasarely Muzeum, Budapest
- 2003 - Australian Embassy, Dublin
- 2003 - Australian Embassy, Berlin
- 2004 - Charlemagne Building, Brussels
- 2004 - Maitland Regional Art Gallery
- 2004 - Michael Carr Gallery, Sydney
- 2005 - Solander Gallery, Canberra
- 2005 - University of Sydney
- 2013 - National Portrait Gallery, Canberra

== Awards and distinctions ==
On 14 June 1969 Cassab was appointed a Commander of the Order of the British Empire (CBE) in "recognition of service to the visual arts".

On 26 January 1988 Cassab was appointed an Officer of the Order of Australia (AO) again in "recognition of service to the visual arts".

On 3 March 1995 Cassab was awarded a Doctor of Letters (honoris causa) from the University of Sydney.

In 2011 Cassab was awarded Hungary’s Gold Cross of Merit.

- 1955 - The Perth Prize
- 1955 - The Australian Women's Weekly Prize
- 1956 - The Australian Women's Weekly Prize
- 1961 - The Archibald Prize (portrait of Stanislaus Rapotec)
- 1964 - Sir Charles Lloyd Jones Memorial Prize
- 1964 - The Helena Rubenstein Prize, Perth
- 1965 - The Helena Rubenstein Prize, Perth
- 1965 - Sir Charles Lloyd Jones Memorial Prize
- 1968 - The Archibald Prize (portrait of Margo Lewers)
- 1971 - Sir Charles Lloyd Jones Memorial Prize
- 1973 - Sir Charles Lloyd Jones Memorial Prize
- 1994 - The Trustee Watercolour Prize, Art Gallery of New South Wales
- 1994 - The Pring Prize, Art Gallery of NSW
- 1996 - The Nita Kibble Award for Literature, for Diaries
- 1996 - Foundation for Australian Literary Studies Award, James Cook University, Townsville
- 1997 - The Pring Prize, Art Gallery of NSW
- 1998 - The Pring Prize, Art Gallery of NSW
- 2003 - The Pring Prize, Art Gallery of NSW
- 2003 - The Trustee Watercolour Prize, Art Gallery of New South Wales
- 2004 - The Painters and Sculptors Association of Australia Medal

== Personal life ==
Cassab died on 3 November 2015 at the age of 95 in her nursing home in the Sydney suburb of Randwick.

Awards
Preceded by William Dobell	Archibald Prize; 1960 for Stanislaus Rapotec	Succeeded by William Edwin Pidgeon
Preceded by Jon Molvig	Archibald Prize; 1967 for Margo Lewers	Succeeded by William Edwin Pidgeon
