= Michael Kmit =

Ukrainian-Australian artist (1910–1981)

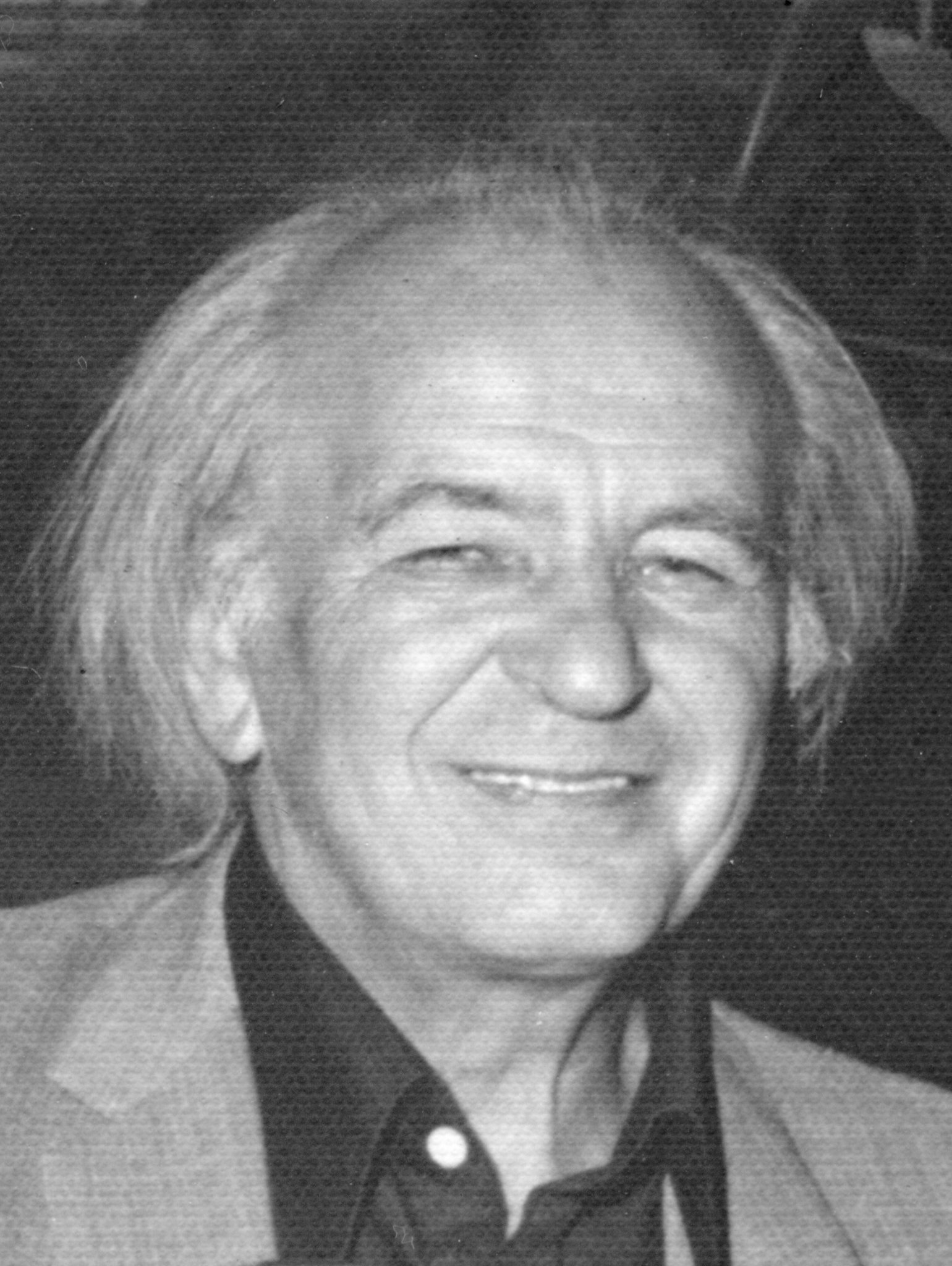
- Michael Kmit in 1975
- Born: 25 July 1910; Stryi, Kingdom of Galicia and Lodomeria (Now Ukraine)
- Died: 22 May 1981 (aged 70); Sydney, Australia
- Education: Kraków Academy of Fine Arts
- Notable work: Evangelist John Mark, The Voice of Silence, Philopena
- Movement: neo-Byzantine, Cubism, Constructivism
- Awards: Blake Prize (1954); Sulman Prize (1957 and 1970)

Michael Kmit (Ukrainian: Михайло Кміт) (25 July 1910 in Stryi, Lviv – 22 May 1981 in Sydney, Australia) was a Ukrainian painter who spent twenty-five years in Australia. He is notable for introducing a neo-Byzantine style of painting to Australia, and winning a number of major Australian art prizes including the Blake Prize (1952) and the Sulman Prize (in both 1957 and 1970). In 1969 the Australian artist and art critic James Gleeson described Kmit as "one of the most sumptuous colourists of our time".

== Arrival in Australia ==
Michael Kmit studied at the Academy of Fine Arts, Kraków, but due to the conflict in World War II, he was forced to leave his homeland and found himself a displaced person in Innsbruck, Austria where he met Dorothea (Edda) in 1945. They married in Landeck and later moved to Bregenz where his two daughters, Xenia & Tania (Tatiana) were born, in 1946 and 1948. While in post-war Europe Kmit studied under cubist Fernand Léger in Paris, and futurist Carlo Carrà in Italy.

Kmit emigrated to Australia in 1949, as part of the Australian Government's immigration scheme. He was contracted to work in Sydney for two years in a job selected for him by the Australian Government's employment service. He initially worked at a cement factory in Villawood, New South Wales, and then as a railway porter as contracted reimbursement for his passage. But after Kmit met the artists James Gleeson and Paul Haefliger, who were impressed with his work, he was introduced to other artists including Donald Friend and Russell Drysdale. His artist friends later helped him find lodging at Merioola and work nearer to the artist community in Sydney. Painting at night, during the day Kmit worked as a railway porter and cleaner while he established himself "as one of Australia's best artists" of the time. He lived in Elizabeth Bay with his family until he moved to the United States.

== Influence on Australian Art ==
Kmit's images, inspired by the Byzantine style of religious icon painting, were well received in Australia for their fresh approach and new subjects. Labeled neo-Byzantine, his paintings integrated stylized portraiture with geometric cubist and constructivist forms, patterns and vivid colour.

During the 1950s, before leaving for the United States at the latter end of the decade, Kmit was a major influence on many artists, particularly those of the Merioola Group (also known as the "Charm School"). Gleeson described Kmit as "one of the most sumptuous colourists of our time". Paul Haefliger wrote: "Of all the foreign aspirants to art who have visited these shores since the war, Michael Kmit is the only one who has made an impression on the present generation of painters."

After winning a string of awards including the Blake Prize (1953) and the Sulman Prize (1957), he left Australia for the United States in 1958, residing in the San Francisco-Bay Area of California. His American period did not result in a lot of success and also, due to the end of his marriage, he went through a period of depression. Returning in 1965 his style and format had changed and the high praise for his work was replaced with cautious criticism. He married Norma Randall a few years after his return to Australia and his son Michael Kmit Junior was born in May, 1968. However, by the time "Cassandra" (1979) was painted, only two years before his death, Kmit had returned to the previous vigour of his 1950s works.

== Exhibitions ==
In 1951 Michael Kmit showed his work for the first time in Brisbane at the Johnstone Gallery, where the owner Brian Johnstone intended to exhibit "the most creative work in Australia today", particularly that of "brilliant" younger artists. Until his death Kmit exhibited in numerous group shows throughout the Australian States of Queensland, Victoria, Western Australia, Tasmania, New South Wales and South Australia, including selections for the Archibald, Wynne and Sulman prizes.

Kmit was a member and exhibited with the Sydney branch of the Contemporary Art Society, the "Sydney Group" and the Society of Artists. He was also an honorary member, and exhibited with the Ukrainian Artists Society of Australia.

A selection of exhibitions included:

- 1951 — Contemporary Art Society (NSW) Annual Exhibition
- 1952 — Society of Artists Spring Exhibition, Sydney
- 1952 — Show of Sixes Annual Exhibition, Macquarie Galleries
- 1952 — Contemporary Art Society (NSW) 14th Annual Exhibition
- 1953 — Society of Artists Annual Exhibition, Department of Education Art Gallery, Sydney
- 1953 — Show of Sixes Annual Exhibition, Macquarie Galleries
- 1954 — Contemporary Art Society (NSW) Annual Exhibition
- 1954 — Exhibited with the Sydney Group
- 1956 — Society of Artists Annual Exhibition
- 1956 — 'Contemporary Australian Painting', Pacific Loan Exhibition, Art Gallery of NSW and on board the SS Orcades
- 1957 — Society of Artists Exhibition of drawings and prints. David Jones Art Gallery
- 1957 — Show of Eights, Macquarie Galleries
- 1965 — Dominion Galleries, Darlinghurst Sydney
- 1965 — Australian Galleries, Melbourne
- 1967 — Australian Painters Exhibition (Mertz Collection), [Corcoran Gallery of Art], Washington DC, USA
- 1968 — Solo exhibition, Von Bertouch Galleries, Newcastle
- 1979 — Solo exhibition, Niagara Lane Galleries, Melbourne (7–27 June 1979)
- 1974 — Group Show Official Opening of Phillip Bacon Galleries Queensland
- 1979 — Solo exhibition in Holdsworth Galleries Woollahra, Sydney
- 1980 — Solo Exhibition at the Fine Art Gallery, Western Australia
- 1980 — Blake Exhibition in Sydney
- 1982 — Solo exhibition, Von Bertouch Galleries, Newcastle (26 Feb – 14 Mar 1982)
- 1988 — Body and Soul, Monash University Gallery (19 September – 15 October 1988)
- 2010 — Centenary Exhibition (retrospective), Studio W – Woolloomooloo Sydney

== Awards ==
- 1952 — Blake Prize for Religious Art (Second prize of 50 guineas) – with The Ascension
- 1953 — Blake Prize for Religious Art with The Evangelist, John Mark
- 1954 — Perth Prize for Contemporary Art with King's Cross Facade
- 1955 — Critics Prize for Contemporary Art
- 1956 — Darcy Morris Memorial Prize
- 1957 — Sulman Prize — with The Voice of Silence
- 1967 — Melrose Art Prize, Adelaide ($500)
- 1970 — Sulman Prize — with Philopena

== Collections held ==
- Art Gallery of New South Wales
- Art Gallery of South Australia
- Art Gallery of Western Australia
- Ballarat Fine Art Gallery, Ballarat
- Cbus Collection of Australian Art
- Harold E. Mertz Collection of Australian Art, University of Texas, USA
- National Gallery of Australia, Canberra
- National Gallery of Victoria
- Queensland Art Gallery
- Tasmanian Museum and Art Gallery
- University collections at:
  - University of Sydney
  - University of Queensland
  - Monash University, Melbourne

== Sources ==
- 'Michael Kmit Paintings 1953–1979', Niagara Lane Galleries, Melbourne, exhibition catalogue, 7–27 June 1979
- 'Michael Kmit', Von Bertouch Galleries, Newcastle, exhibition list, 26 Feb – 14 Mar 1982
- L. Voloshyn (2024). "Кміт Михайло". Мистецька школа Олекси Новаківського 1923-1935. Життя у перспективі часу (in Ukrainian). Lviv–Drohobych: Kolo. p. 269—273, 367—368. ISBN 978-617-642-676-9.
