= Anne Von Bertouch =

Australian art dealer, author, environmentalist and art gallery director

Anne Von Bertouch OAM
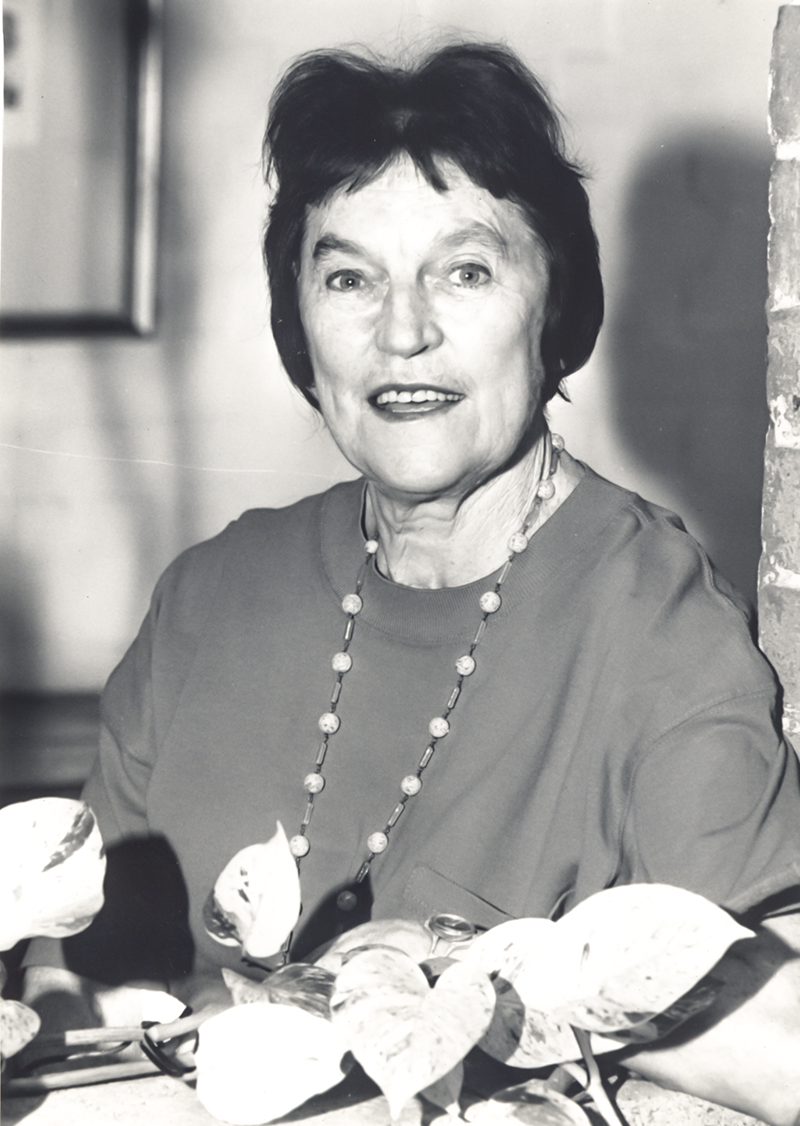
- Anne Von Bertouch
- Born: Anne Catherine Whittle; 29 June 1915; Eastwood, New South Wales, Australia
- Died: 31 March 2015 (aged 84); Newcastle, New South Wales
- Education: Sydney Girls High School, Armidale Teachers College
- Alma mater: University of Newcastle, Australia and University of New England, Australia
- Occupation: Art gallery director
- Known for: Director of the Von Bertouch Galleries (1963–2002)
- Spouse: Roger Von Bertouch (m. 1939; sep. 1969)

Anne Von Bertouch, OAM (29 June 1915 – 31 March 2003) was an Australian art dealer, author, environmentalist and director of the Von Bertouch Galleries in Newcastle, New South Wales, believed to be the first commercial gallery outside a capital city in Australia.

== Biography ==
Born Anne Catherine, to parents Jean (née Duff) and George Whittle on 29 June 1915 in Eastwood, New South Wales, she was educated at Sydney Girls High School and Armidale Teachers College. After teacher training her first posting was at Adamstown Infants School in the 1930s. She married Roger Von Bertouch in 1939. In 1941 she was the organiser of a National Fitness Camp for girls at Broken Bay, New South Wales.

She and Roger moved to Tasmania, where they taught and she studied at Hobart Technical College. In 1942 she performed modern interpretive dance at a Town Hall concert in Hobart organised by the Australian Broadcasting Commission Patriotic Committee as a fundraiser on Allies' Appeal Day. She danced also in Hobart's Opera And Ballet Festival for International Week in 1945.

Intending to develop land and to pursue their artistic interests, they moved to Mungo Brush in the Myall Lakes, New South Wales, in 1951 or 1954, living a subsistence existence from prawn fishing and trading their home-grown produce, and were appointed Honorary Rangers there in 1955 under the Wild Flowers and Native Plants Protection Act. Anne's 1959 semi-autobiographical documentary novel February Dark gives an account of their time there. Finding their block unviable, they moved to Newcastle where they renovated a terrace house. An active environmentalist, in the 1970s she famously chained herself to a tree to stop the widening of King Street, Newcastle, through Birdwood Park.

In 1987 von Bertouch joined the 1988 Australian Bicentennial First Fleet reenactment, sailing on the Soren Larsen from Portsmouth in May 1987 and arriving at Port Jackson on Australia Day.

== Von Bertouch Galleries ==
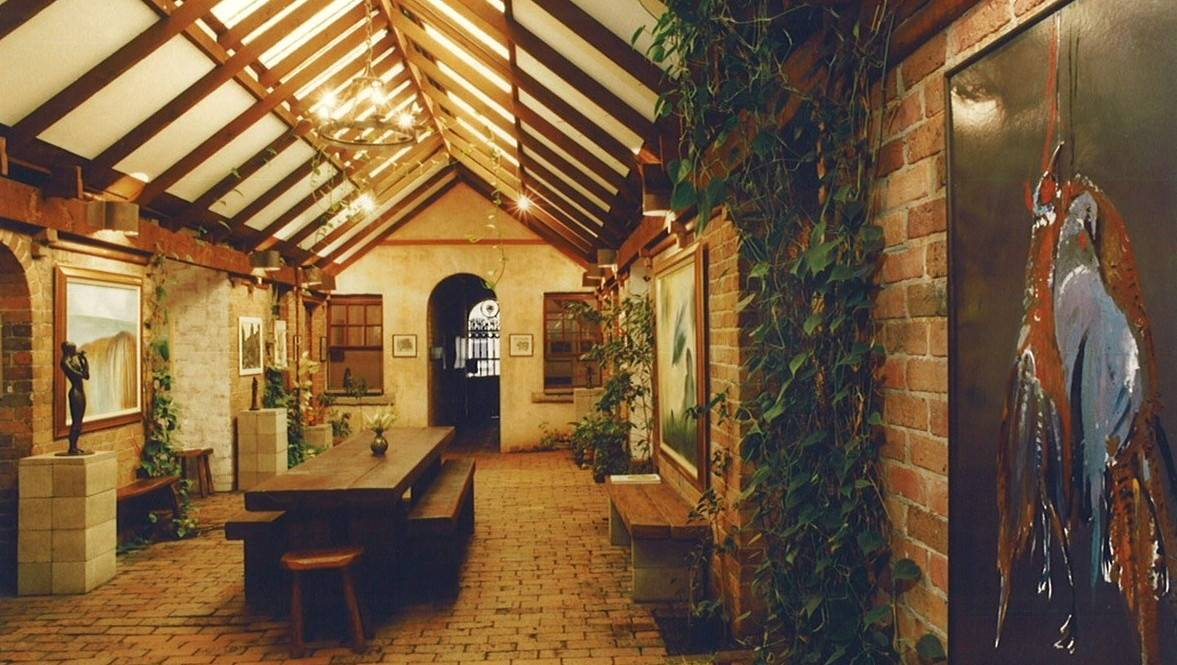
Von Bertouch Galleries, Newcastle

Anne and Roger von Bertouch opened the von Bertouch Galleries in their home at 50 Laman Street in Newcastle on 9 February 1963 which, as noted by The Bulletin magazine, was close to William Dobell's birthplace and the Newcastle Art Gallery. An annual Collectors' Choice exhibition with a price maximum of 15 guineas (a value of A$500 in 2022) was established.

In 1969, not long after Anne had been injured and suffered a coma in a serious car accident near Morisset the couple separated. She acquired near-derelict Hunniford Terrace, a row of four narrow 1877 houses, opposite hers, on three titles surrounding 61 Laman St. They were threatened with demolition, and she combined and converted them, over five years and with the help of friends, to house the gallery, which opened in 1974, after the couple had dissolved their partnership in the gallery in 1973. Gael Davies became Anne's gallery manager in 1975.

Von Bertouch Galleries showed contemporary work by nationally prominent artists, as well as artists associated with the Hunter Region of New South Wales, including still-life painter Margaret Olley (1923–2011), landscapist Shay Docking (1928–1998), mid-century modernist painter and textile designer Mary Beeston (b. 1917), naïve artist Virginia Geyl (b. Holland 1917– d.1999) and the surrealist/religious painter Rona Scott, who created a mural for the film Tommy when it came to Australia. The Collector's Choice group exhibition, established in 1969 at the suggestion of Tom Gleghorn, and which opened the renovated space, became an annual fixture important as part of Newcastle's art scene, and spawned street parties.

The Bulletin in 1974 described Von Bertouch Galleries as "one of the most famous in Australia... It's [sic] director Anne Von Bertouch has made a great contribution to the life of [Newcastle] during the 11 years of the gallery's existence," and quoted her sentiments about selling art;

"I think the gallery has integrity. That is what I have worked hardest to achieve. I have never encouraged the buyer who is only interested in investment. In fact I won't sell to them. I tell them to go and buy real estate. I don't want them to have pictures if they aren't going to appreciate them. It's an anti-art thing...I have never had contracts or ties with any of the artists. Sometimes I've helped people but that is just natural. Artists must create for the sake of creating. They mustn't attempt to please. That can destroy the living quality of the painting. It will always have its own intrinsic value. Commercial gain is really incidental."

The same 1974 issue of The Bulletin listed selling prices in A$ of a number of exhibitors; Charles Blackman $2400 (equivalent to more than $20,000 in 2022); David Boyd $1150; Donald Friend $525; Irvine Homer $300; Pro Hart $950; Reinis Zusters $960; George Lawrence $650; Lloyd Rees $6000; Louis James $200; Ray Crooke $4500; Jamie Boyd $330; Keith Looby $75–$2400; Rona Scott $50–$7000; John Winch $75–$1200; Margaret Olley $200–$950; Virginia Geyl $50–$280; Lillian Sutherland $85–$450; Rae Richards $175–$350; while at its annual Collectors' Choice works were $75 and under (equivalent to $650 in 2022).

Von Bertouch was considered a mentor and fair dealer by her artists; David Boyd remarked that was "the most highly principled person in the gallery world. One could have complete trust in her without having to worry. She was loved very much by all." David Thomas, a previous director (1965–75) of the Newcastle Region Art Gallery remembered her as "tough lady"; "By tough I mean she was of strong character, dedicated to making sure artists were well represented and improving the city's cultural life"

On Saturday 9 February 2002, before its closure, Von Bertouch held a party to celebrate the Galleries' 39 years.

=== Exhibitions at Von Bertouch Galleries ===
- 1963, February: First exhibition; works by artists born or resident in Newcastle: Tom Gleghorn, Ross Morrow, Jon Molvig, William Rose, John Olson, Paul Beadle, John Passmore and William Dobell
- 1963: Shay Docking
- 1963, August–September: Louis James
- 1963, 18–29 October: Henri le Grand pottery
- 1963, 15 November – 3 December: Collectors' choice
- 1963: Tom Gleghorn
- 1964, from 1 March: Homer Irvine
- 1964, to 28 July: Owen Shaw
- 1964, 25 September – 13 October: William Peascod
- 1964, to 17 November: Geoffrey Hooper paintings. Studio pottery by Ivan Englund and Carl McConnell
- 1964, to 24 December: Fabrics and Jewellery
- 1965: Homer Irvine
- 1965, 30 July – 10 August: Landscapes by 12
- 1967, 10 February – 28 February: Shay Docking
- 1967, 3 March – 21 March: John Coburn
- 1967, 24 March – 4 April: Homer Irvine
- 1967, 7 – 25 April: Michael Kitching
- 1967, 23 June – 11 July: Noel Counihan
- 1967, 18 August – 2-September: Paintings of people: Charles Blackman, Robert Dickerson, Frank Hinder, Louis James, Michael Kmit, Jeffrey Smart, Francis Lymburner. Also The Aspendale Papers and Interior lithographs by Charles Blackman"
- 1967, October: David Boyd
- 1967, December: Shigeo Shiga, pottery
- 1968, from 22 March: Frank Hinder
- 1968, Lloyd Rees Various Tasmanian Series. The Derwent Estuary 1 and 2; The Edge of the Forest, Tasmania; The Stream from the Mountain; Aftermath; Richmond Hills 1 and 2; The River at Richmond 1, 2, 3, 4 and 5.
- 1969, May: Desiderius Orban
- 1969, August: Norman Lindsay
- 1970, 6 – 23 March: Laurence Hope
- 1970, April: Judy Cassab
- 1970, June: Virginia Geyl
- 1971 Shay Docking
- 1971, from 10 to 23 December: Sculpture by Lenore (BOYD); includes biographical note by the sculptor: folding card invitation.
- 1972, from 1 March: Memory paintings of days on the track
- 1972, 28 June – 15 July: House show
- 1973, 3 August – 27 August: Ray Crooke
- 1973, October: Rae Richards
- 1973, November – December: Collectors' Choice: painting, graphics, sculpture, pottery and jewellery. Coburn, Cassab, Crooke. James, Hinder, Gleghorn, Kmit and others.
- 1973, to 24 December: Lillian Sutherland, Recent Paintings from Lighting Ridge
- 1974, February: Robert Campbell Retrospective
- 1974, to March 11: Print Prize Exhibition and Piers Bateman solo show
- 1974, 18–28 August: House show
- 1974, 10–30 November: Newcastle artists: Gavin Crichton, Garry Jones, John Martin, Christine Ross
- 1975, to 28 April: Maximillian Feuerring, paintings and drawings
- 1975, 22 August – 14 September: International Women's Year – Newcastle artists: Norma Allen, Mary Beeston, Rosemary Coote, Joy Foster, Rachel Frecker, Virginia Geyl, Judy Hepper, Madeleine Scott Jones, Marilyn McGrath, Elizabeth Martin, Margaret Olley, Rae Richards, Christine Ross, Rona Scott, Coughtrie Thurlow, Pauline Tickner
- 1978, 28 July – 13 August: Silver Ware, Kelims and carpets from Afghanistan, Iran, Turkey and Russia collected by Jeffery Kitto of Sydney
- 1980 : Shay Docking
- 1981, 10 April – 26 April: Lloyd Rees; And Yet Australia Calls You Back Again
- 1983, 11 February – 6 March: Twentieth anniversary exhibition to commemorate the inaugural exhibition of February 9, 1963: Paul Beedle, William Dobell, Thomas Gleghorn, John Molvig, Ross Morrow, John Olsen, John Passmore, William Rose, Charles Lewis, Kay Campbell, Francis Cetlan, Cheryl Cusick, Marion Ermer, Andrew Ferguson, Graham Gilchrist, Ronald Hawke, Gail Johns, Ted Prior, Gordon Rintoul, Christine Ross, Philip Samuels, John Wolseley
- 1983, 1 July – 24 July: Blue Days on the Derwent. Tasmanian Exhibition by Lloyd Rees.
- 1984, 17 February – 1 March: Twenty first anniversary exhibition: Charles Blackman, Nancy Borlase, Frank Hinder, Margel Hinder, Louis James, Michael Kmit, Robert Klippel, Alun Leach-Jones, Desiderius Orban, Matthew Perceval, Brett Whiteley, Aldona Zakarauskas
- 1985, 15 March – 7 April: Lloyd Rees – Sandy Bay Set
- 1987, 3 – 26 April: Lloyd Rees: Paintings and Graphics
- 1991, 12 – 28 July: David Middlebrook: paintings and wood blocks
- 1991, 2 – 25 August: Jamie Boyd: paintings, pastels, graphics.
- 1991, 30 August – 15 September: Graphics by the famous : etchings, lithographs, screenprints
- 1992, 28 February – 22 March: David Preston : hand coloured linocuts
- 1992, 24 April – 17 May: Madeleine Winch : paintings
- 1993, 19 March 1993 – 12 April: Arthur Boyd; Paintings, Collographs, etchings
- 1998, 20 March – 12 April: Sixties reviewed: Nancy Borlase, Shay Docking, Robert Grieve, Louis James, Elwyn Lynn, Guy Warren
- 1998, 4 – 27 September: Works on paper: Sidney Nolan, Donald Friend, John Coburn, Charles Blackman, Arthur Boyd
- 2003, to 9 March: Judy Cassab

== Awards ==
- Honorary master's degrees from the universities of Newcastle and New England
- 1979: Medal of the Order of Australia "for services to the visual arts"
- 1987: Newton-John alumni award
- 2001: Centenary Medal "for service to the community"
- 2002: The University of Newcastle honorary doctorate of letters
- 2002: Recognised in Newcastle as a Freeman of the City

== Author ==
Von Bertouch's 1959 novel February Dark, runner-up in The Sydney Morning Herald Literary Award, was based on her experience of life in Myall Lakes. It was reissued by Hunniford's Lane Press in 1982. Her other published works include The Ride Home and a 1000-copy limited-edition monograph on sculptor Guy Boyd, described by Canberra Times reviewer Glenda Alexander as a "delightful story, if touched with the hint of sentimentality which the Boyds always seem to attract."

== Publications ==
- Bertouch, Anne (1959). February Dark. London: Constable. OCLC 1069851970.
- Von Bertouch, Anne (1983). The ride home. Newcastle, N.S.W.: Hunniford's Lane Press. ISBN 978-0-9592824-1-2. OCLC 27623615.
- Golden Age Fine Art Gallery; Von Bertouch, Anne; Boyd, Guy; Boyd, Phyllis (1985). Guy Boyd survey exhibition: bronze sculpture. Ballarat: The Gallery. OCLC 221487561.
- Boyd, Guy Martin; Bertouch, Anne von; Hutchings, Patrick; Von Bertouch, Anne (1986). Guy Boyd. Melbourne: Lansdowne. OCLC 781998112.
- Von Bertouch, Anne; Von Bertouch Galleries (1990). What was it before it was a gallery?. Newcastle, N.S.W.: Hunniford's Lane Press. ISBN 978-0-9592824-2-9. OCLC 220744993.
- Von Bertouch, Anne (1991). The voyage out: the First Fleet re-enactment. Newcastle, N.S.W.: Hunnifords Lane Press. ISBN 978-0-9592824-3-6. OCLC 26579510.
- Germaine, Max; Bertouch, Anne von (1991). A dictionary of women artists of Australia. ISBN 978-976-8097-13-2. OCLC 1056680264.

== Archival resources ==
- National Library of Australia : [Biographical cuttings on Anne von Bertouch, author, containing one or more cuttings from newspapers or journals], Bib ID: 2085354
- National Library of Australia, Manuscript Collection : Papers of Anne von Bertouch, circa 1960-circa 1999 [manuscript], c. 1960 – c. 1999, MS Acc03.266
- Newcastle Region Library : Diary, correspondence and memorabilia [manuscript], 1975 – 1978, Call number: 910.4/VON; Anne Von Bertouch travel documents and diaries [manuscript]

== Death and legacy ==
Following a severe stroke, Von Bertouch died on 26 April 2003. Her funeral at Christ Church Cathedral with a eulogy by Newcastle Region Art Gallery director Nick Mitzevich was attended by 500 mourners. Shortly before her death Von Bertouch bequeathed a total of 136 works from her personal collection to the Newcastle Region Art Gallery, the biggest art collection bestowed to it in 58 years and valued in the millions of dollars; they were exhibited there in March 2003. In November 2005 350 artworks still in her gallery were auctioned as required by the Uncollected Goods Act of 1995.

After her death manager Gael Davies attempted to hold a 41st Collectors' Choice exhibition on October 31, 2003, and the remaining scheduled shows for 2003, but an estate dispute was underway and the shows could not go ahead; consequently the gallery remained closed. Von Bertouch left her estate to her then 23-year-old great niece Cassandra Bird and to Davies. In March 2004 Bird sought to buy Davies' share and to reopen the gallery. Davies rejected the offer as unviable and proposed instead a new, smaller gallery be built on a parcel of land in Laman Street from the sale of surrounding land. The dispute became litigious with the outcome being its sale in 2007 by Supreme Court-appointed trustee Ferrier Hodgson.

The terraces were purchased by Dick Lees for #1,420,000 in 2007, and in 2010 were listed for sale at A$1.6 million. The four terrace houses sold together for a fourth time in 2015. Matt and Marilyn Sainsbury, new owners of the gallery buildings, with Matt's sister Helen Griffin, commissioned Newcastle sculptor Graham Wilson, an exhibitor at the gallery, to carve a bust in Wollombi sandstone honouring her memory and her place in Cooks Hill life. Installed in 2019, it stands outside the former gallery on Laman Street.
