= Society of Artists =

Society of Artists may refer to:

- Society of Artists of Great Britain — an art society operating in Great Britain between 1761 and 1791
- Society of Artists (Australia) — an art society operating in Australia between 1895 and 1962
