= Treania Smith =

Australian art dealer, art gallery owner and artist

Treania Smith BEM
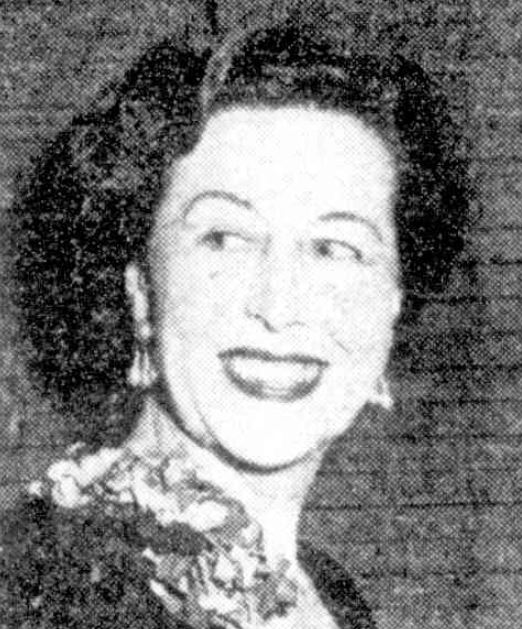
- Smith in 1950
- Born: Treania Helen Lindsay Smith; 23 January 1901; Clayfield, Queensland, Australia
- Died: 21 September 1990 (aged 89); Bayview, New South Wales, Australia

Treania Helen Lindsay Smith BEM (23 January 1901 – 21 September 1990), also known as Ena Smith but best known as Treania Smith, was an Australian art dealer, art gallery owner and artist.

== Early life and education ==
Treania Smith was born on 23 January 1901 in Clayfield, a suburb in Brisbane. Her parents, Margaret Mackenzie (née Lindsay) and architect Edwin Evan Smith, were both born in Scotland. Her father was president of the Queensland Art Society in the 1920s before moving to Melbourne where he was principal architect with the Victorian Public Works Department. Smith studied art with Max Meldrum and also attended Brisbane Central Technical College, where she was taught by Lewis Jarvis Harvey. She also studied sculpture at the Workingmen's College in Melbourne.

== Career ==
Smith exhibited a portrait of her father at the 1921 annual exhibition of the Queensland Art Society, a reviewer noting that she "excels in portraiture and still life studies". Her portraits were hung in the Archibald Prize in 1925, 1927 and 1932; her landscapes were exhibited in the Wynne Prize in 1932, 1934, 1935, 1936, 1938 and 1943.

She created a bust of Lady McPherson which was unveiled by the Duchess of York when she opened the Emily McPherson College of Domestic Economy in 1927.

In mid-1929 Smith left for London to further her studies in sculpture, returning in December the following year. While away, she was taught by sculptor Alexander Carrick and landscape artist William George Gillies at the Edinburgh College of Art.

Moving to Sydney in the early 1930s, Smith was taught life modelling by Rayner Hoff at East Sydney Technical College. While there, she met Beryl Young. Young's father was one of the two founders of the Macquarie Galleries. Smith held her first solo exhibition in 1934 at the gallery and subsequently worked there for John Young.

In partnership with Lucy Swanton, Smith bought the Macquarie Galleries in 1938. When the partnership ended in 1956, Smith was joined by a series of co-directors, Mary Killen (1956–1976), Penny Meagher (1966–1972) and finally Eileen Chanin (1976–1979).

== Recognition and legacy ==
Smith was awarded the British Empire Medal (BEM) in the 1979 Queen's Birthday Honours for her service to the arts.

Smith was interviewed on her contribution to the Australian art scene by Hazel de Berg in 1965 for the National Library of Australia and by James Gleeson in 1979 for National Gallery of Australia.

A portrait of Smith by Ena Joyce was a finalist in the 1951 Archibald Prize. Well-known artists, Thea Proctor and Judy Cassab, also painted her likeness.

== Personal ==
Smith married long-time friend Clive Edwin Bennett in 1962. In 1979 the couple moved to Whale Beach. She died at Bayview on 21 September 1990. Her husband predeceased her.
