= Arthur Fleischmann =

Slovak-English sculptor (1896–1990)

Arthur Fleischmann (1896, Bratislava – 2 March 1990, Tenerife) was a Slovak-born, London-based sculptor, who pioneered the use of perspex in sculpture. He spent time in Bali, and in Australia, where he was at the centre of the Merioola Group, before settling in London.

== Early life ==
Fleischmann was born in 1896 in Pressburg, Austria-Hungary (now Bratislava, Slovakia). He studied medicine in Budapest and Prague, before turning to sculpture, and winning a scholarship to the Master School of Sculpture at the Academy of Fine Arts Vienna.

== Australian years ==
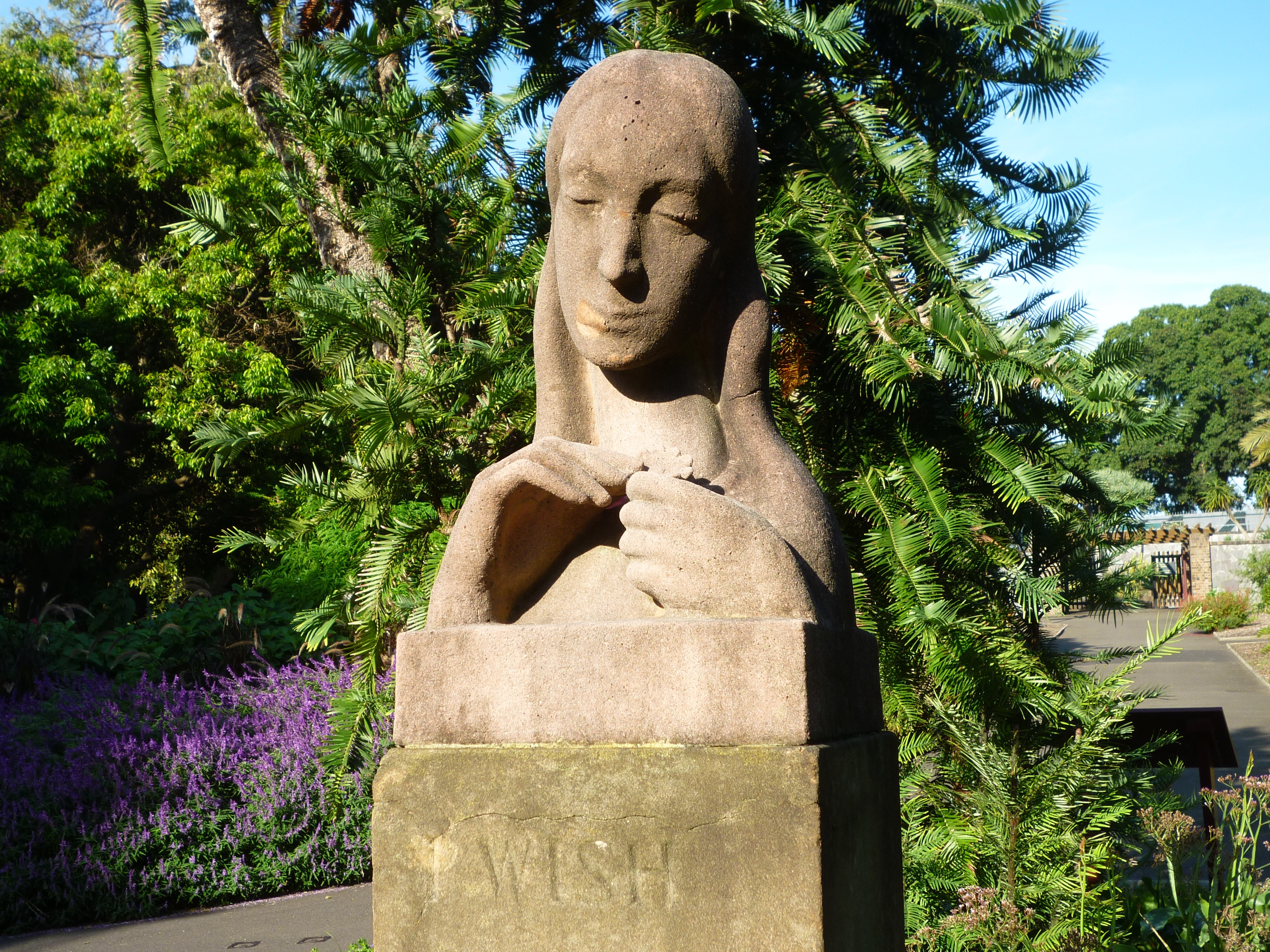
"I Wish" (1946), in the Royal Botanic Gardens, Sydney

He left Europe in 1937, travelling to South Africa and Zanzibar before spending two years in Bali, where he converted from his native Judaism to Catholicism, with the encouragement of a Dutch colonial missionary, Father Buys. The forms of traditional Balinese dancers became a lifelong influence on Fleischmann's work.

Fleeing the Japanese occupation of the Dutch East Indies, Fleischmann moved to Australia in 1939, where he became the centre of the Merioola Group, named after his home in Rosemont Avenue, Woollahra. He was elected a member of the Society of Artists in Sydney, sculpting portraits of prominent Australians including Cardinal Gilroy, Governor-General Lord Gowrie, Sir Frederick Jordan, Sir John Butters, Sir Percy Spender, the pianist Gaultiero Volterra and violinist Jeanne Gautier.

His two best-known works from this period are the 1946 wishing tree memorial I wish for the Royal Botanic Gardens in Sydney; and the Bronze Doors on the Mitchell Wing of the State Library of New South Wales, given by Sir William Dixson in honour of David Scott Mitchell.

== London years ==
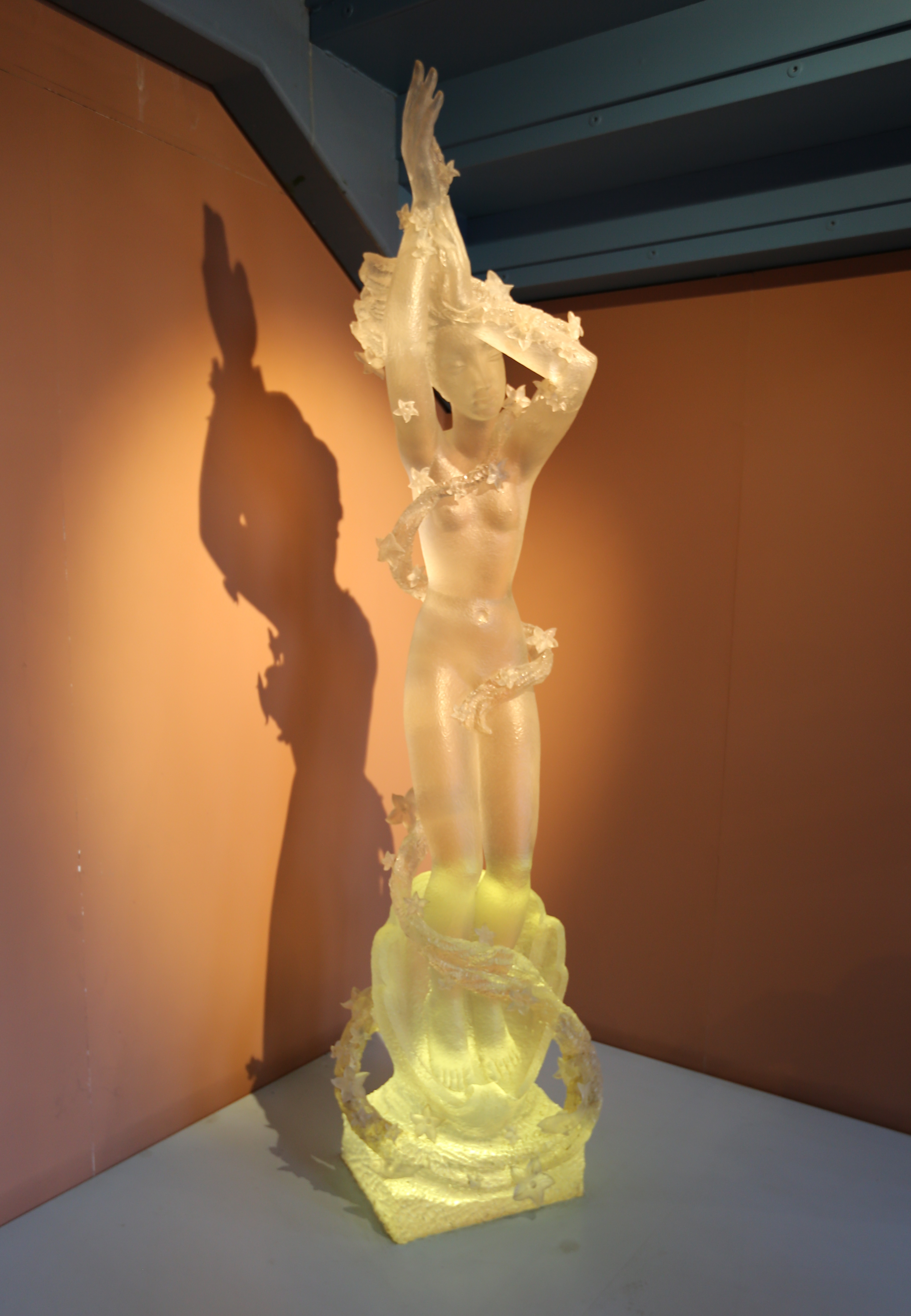
Birth of Aphrodite sculpted by Fleischmann in 1955

In 1948, Fleischmann returned to Europe and settled in London. He married his wife Joy in 1959 and their son, the photographer Dominique Fleischmann, was born in 1961.

Fleischmann produced sculptures of personalities of the day, including Lord Robens, the opera singer Kathleen Ferrier, the actress Joan Collins, and the ballerina Svetlana Beriosova. His bust of Trevor Howard is in the collection of the National Portrait Gallery.

Fleishmann pioneered the use of perspex in sculpture, including some notable public pieces. In 1956, the Pacific Steam Navigation Company (PSNC) commissioned The Birth of Aphrodite for their ship Reina del Mar. Fleischmann carved the piece from a half-ton block of clear perspex built up from laminated sheets. For the 1970 World Expo in Osaka, Japan, he created a perspex fountain for the British Pavilion, entitled Harmony and progress. In 1963, he featured in a British Pathe newsreel about perspex sculpture.

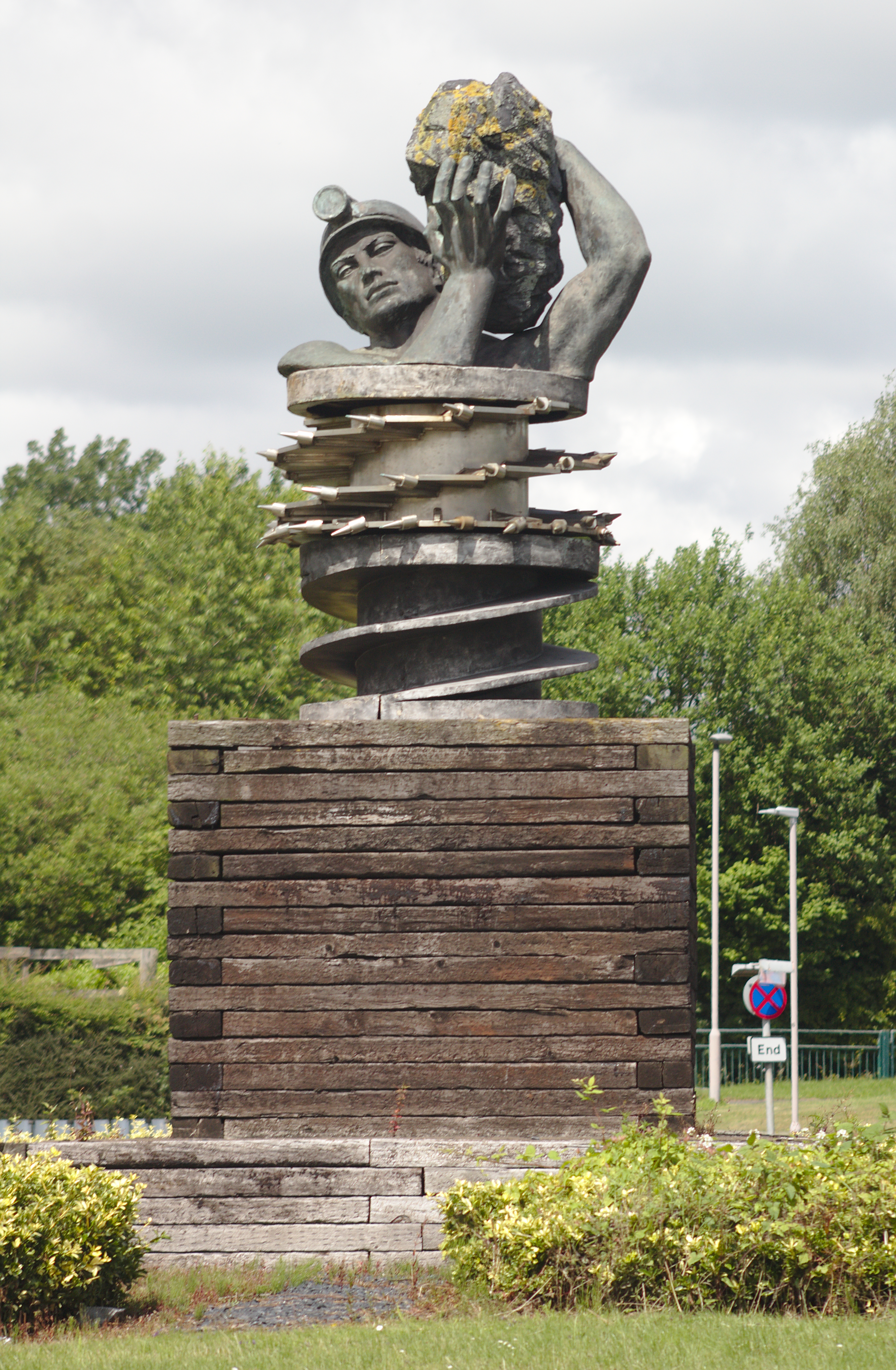
Anderton mining monument in St Helens

In 1977 his Silver Jubilee Crystal Crown, carved out of a massive block of acrylic, was unveiled by Queen Elizabeth II at St Katharine Docks in London, in celebration of her Silver Jubilee. The acrylic block had originally been commissioned by Stanley Kubrick as the alien monolith in the film 2001: A Space Odyssey, but Kubrick rejected it in favour of a piece made from black basalt.

Fleischmann's work was influenced by his Roman Catholic faith; he is the only artist to have sculpted four Popes from life. His Tryptych of the Holy Rosary (1958) was commissioned for the Lady Chapel at Westminster Cathedral. It consists of three clear perspex panels carved in relief. His bronze of Pope John Paul II was unveiled at the Venerable English College in Rome by the Pope on the occasion of the 400th anniversary of the college in 1979.

Other later portrait subjects include Sir Charles Mackerras, the ballerina Doreen Wells, and the actor Barry Humphries. His last work was a perspex water sculpture, Tribute to the Discovery of DNA; like his early "Bronze Doors", it is installed at the New South Wales State Library.

Fleischmann died on 2 March 1990 at the age of 93, while on holiday in Tenerife, Canary Islands.

== Legacy ==
In 2001, the Arthur Fleischmann Foundation was formed. Working with the Mestske Muzeum and the City of Bratislava Council, the Foundation helped set up a permanent museum in the house at #6 Biela ulica, Bratislava where Arthur Fleischmann grew up.

He is also commemorated with a plaque at his London home on Carlton Hill, Westminster. The plaque was unveiled on 28 July 1998 by the Austrian and Slovak ambassadors, together with the Deputy Lord Mayor of Westminster, Joy Fleischmann, and former Arts Minister, Lord Gowrie.

Since 2004 there is a plaque at the house Favoritenstraße 12 in Vienna (now a hotel), where he lived and worked from 1934 to 1938.
