= Hall Thorpe =

John Hall Thorpe (29 April 1874 – 8 October 1947), invariably known as Hall Thorpe, was an Australian artist who achieved considerable success in England with his decorative prints of flowers, fruit and landscapes.

== History ==
Thorpe was born in Sandridge, Victoria and when quite young the family moved to New South Wales, finally settled in Sydney, where he was educated at St John's Grammar School, Parramatta. He studied at the Society of Arts and was briefly employed at the Illustrated Sydney News. He learned the trade or craft of woodblock engraving as an apprentice on John Fairfax's Sydney Mail from 1891. When zinc replaced wood as the engraving medium, he became a staff artist, succeeding Norman Hardy as their principal artist in 1897. He was a member of the (Sydney) Society of Artists, and showed successfully alongside the likes of G. W. Lambert, Sid Long, Dattilo-Rubbo, J. S. Watkins, Edith Loudon, Mildred Rivett, Tom Roberts, W. F. Hughes, C. Lloyd Jones and Howard Ashton.

In 1898 he had several paintings shown at the Grafton Galleries' "Exhibition of Australian Art" in London, and in May 1900 left for England, his position on the Mail having become tenuous with the advent of photo-engraving. He attended Heatherley’s School of Art and developed a distinctive style of coloured woodcut prints. He exhibited at the Royal Academy's Colonial Exhibition in 1906 alongside Arthur Streeton, G. W. Lambert, Albert Tucker, Edith Lumley and Hayley Lever. A breakthrough came when he received a favorable notice from eminent critic M. Camille Mauclair. Around this time he changed direction and resuscitated his hard-won skills as a woodblock engraver, producing the large, bold bright colourful prints for which he became famous. One of these, A Country Bunch, at 25 by 30 inches (64 by 76 cm) was possibly the largest woodblock colour art print ever published. He took control of the whole process; engraving, printing and publishing from his studio at 36 Redcliffe Square, and gallery at 32 Sussex Place, South Kensington, and the results found their way into many homes on both sides of the Atlantic, as well as art collections of the Contemporary Art Society, British Royalty, and the Victoria and Albert Museum. The response to his designs could by summarised by a couple of American critics:

"They are not great works of art; they are intimate pictures. They sing out from a white wall, recalling a walk through a garden or a day with Nature" and "His work is consistent in its dignity, its strength, and its happy related colour ... He is never abstruse nor exaggerated, but he emphasises the grace of forms and the joyousness of pure fresh colour."

Thorpe became a household name in the field of home decoration and was a strong influence on fashions in wallpaper design. Over time his work fell out of fashion but a revival from the 1980s has renewed interest in his work.

He caught pneumonia and died at Bexhill-on-Sea in 1947.

== Works ==
- He is represented in the print collection of the British Museum.
- The National Art Gallery of New South Wales purchased two of his etchings: Castlereagh Street and The Synagogue.
- The Art Gallery of Western Australia has a copy of the print A Summer Bunch.
