= SS Reina del Mar (1955) =

Cruise ship

- SS Reina del Mar (1955) – Union Castle livery

History

United Kingdom
- Name: Reina del Mar (1955–75)
- Owner: Pacific Steam Navigation Company (1955–63); TSA & Max Wilson Group (1963–64); Pacific Steam Navigation Company (1964–73); Union-Castle Line (1973–75)
- Route: As a passenger liner, United Kingdom to the western coast of South America. Then, more broadly as a cruise liner
- Builder: Harland & Wolff, Belfast, Northern Ireland
- Cost: £5,000,000
- Launched: 7 June 1955
- Maiden voyage: 3 May 1956
- Out of service: April 1975
- Home port: Liverpool, under Pacific Steam Navigation Company; Southampton, under Union-Castle Line
- Identification: IMO number: 5292402
- Nickname(s): Queen of the Sea
- Fate: Scrapped, 1975

General characteristics
- Tonnage: 20,334 GRT
- Length: 601 feet (183 m)
- Beam: 78 feet (24 m)
- Propulsion: Steam turbine – twin-screw
- Speed: 18 knots

Reina del Mar was a 20,334 GRT liner which was built by Harland & Wolff in 1955 for Pacific Steam Navigation Company (PSNC). It operated as a passenger liner from the United Kingdom to the western coast of South America until the early 1960s. The Reina del Mar was then a cruise liner that operated out of Southampton during the summer months and out of South Africa during the winter months. It was scrapped in 1975.

== Description ==
Reina del Mar was 601 feet (183 m) long, with a beam of 78 feet (24 m), and measured 20,334 GRT. She was propelled by steam turbines, driving twin-screws, which could propel the ship at 18 knots (33 km/h).

== History ==
=== Passenger liner ===
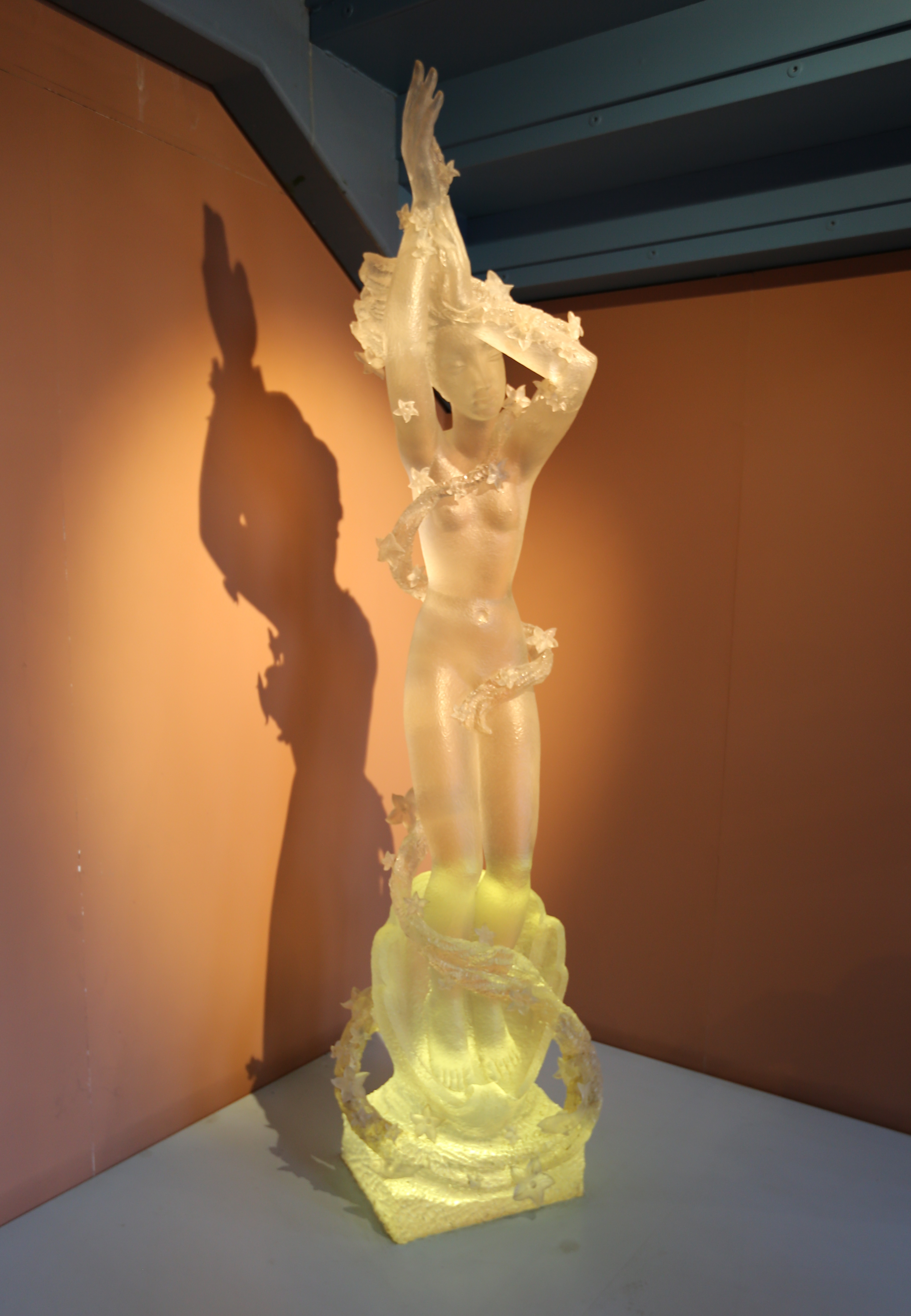
Arthur Fleischmann, Birth of Aphrodite, was displayed in the Embarcation Hall

Launched on 7 June 1955, it offered modern amenities, like private plumbing in passenger cabins and air-conditioning throughout the ship. It was designed to carry freight and passengers, with first, cabin and tourist class accommodations. A perspex statue of Aphrodite, Birth of Aphrodite, which was carved by Arthur Fleischmann stood in the Embarcation Hall.

Pacific Steam operated it as a liner between the United Kingdom and the west coast of South America, making stops at ports in France, Spain, the Caribbean, through the Panama Canal, and along the western coast of South America. Some passengers were on the ship from one port to another, which may have been as few as a day or two, while others traveled several weeks for the entire trip between Liverpool to Valparaíso, Chile.

Due to the advent of international travel by jet aircraft about 1960, fewer passengers traveled extended distances by passenger liner.

=== Cruise ship ===
It operated as a cruise ship—carrying up to 1,047 passengers between 1964 and 1975. Initially she was chartered from her owner, Pacific Steam Ship Company by the Travel Savings Association but managed and crewed by Union-Castle. By 1965 Union-Castle had taken over the charter directly. <ref www.reinadelmar.org/> Based in Southampton, the liner travelled to ports in Scandinavia, the Mediterranean, Canary Islands, West Africa between April and October. Chartered service, called "positioning voyages", ran the other months to South Africa, and then to ports in the Indian Ocean, and South America.

Union-Castle purchased the ship outright in 1973. As was the case for many of the older liners, its business suffered due to the oil crisis of 1973–1974, and it was retired in April 1975 and sold that year to Tung Cheng Steel of Taiwan. It was then scrapped.
