= Merioola Group =

Twentieth-century artist commune in Sydney, Australia

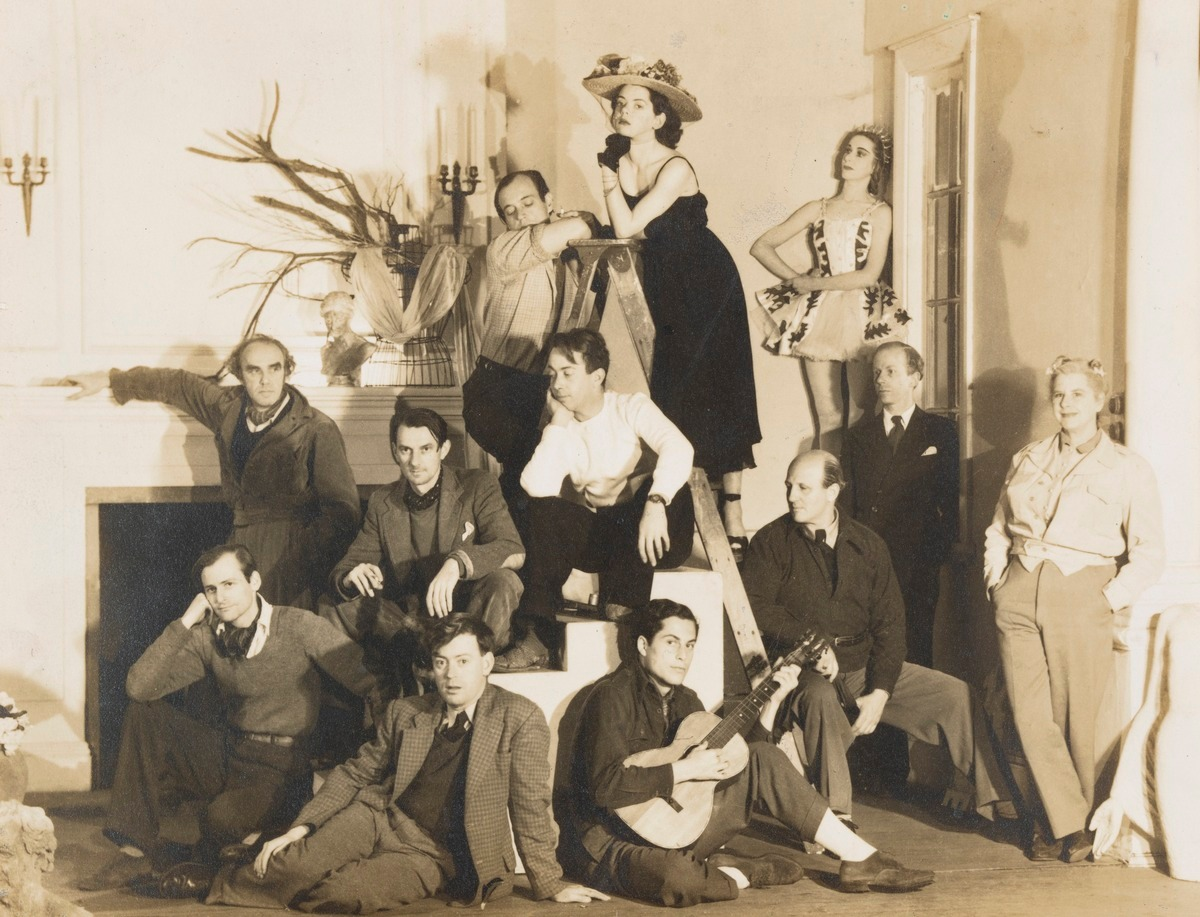
Members of the Merioola Group, photographed in Merioola in the 1940s

The Merioola Group, also known as the Sydney Charm School, was a group of Australian artists active in Sydney during the 1940s and early 1950s. The group was named after Merioola, a Woollahra mansion where many of its members lived.

== Merioola house ==
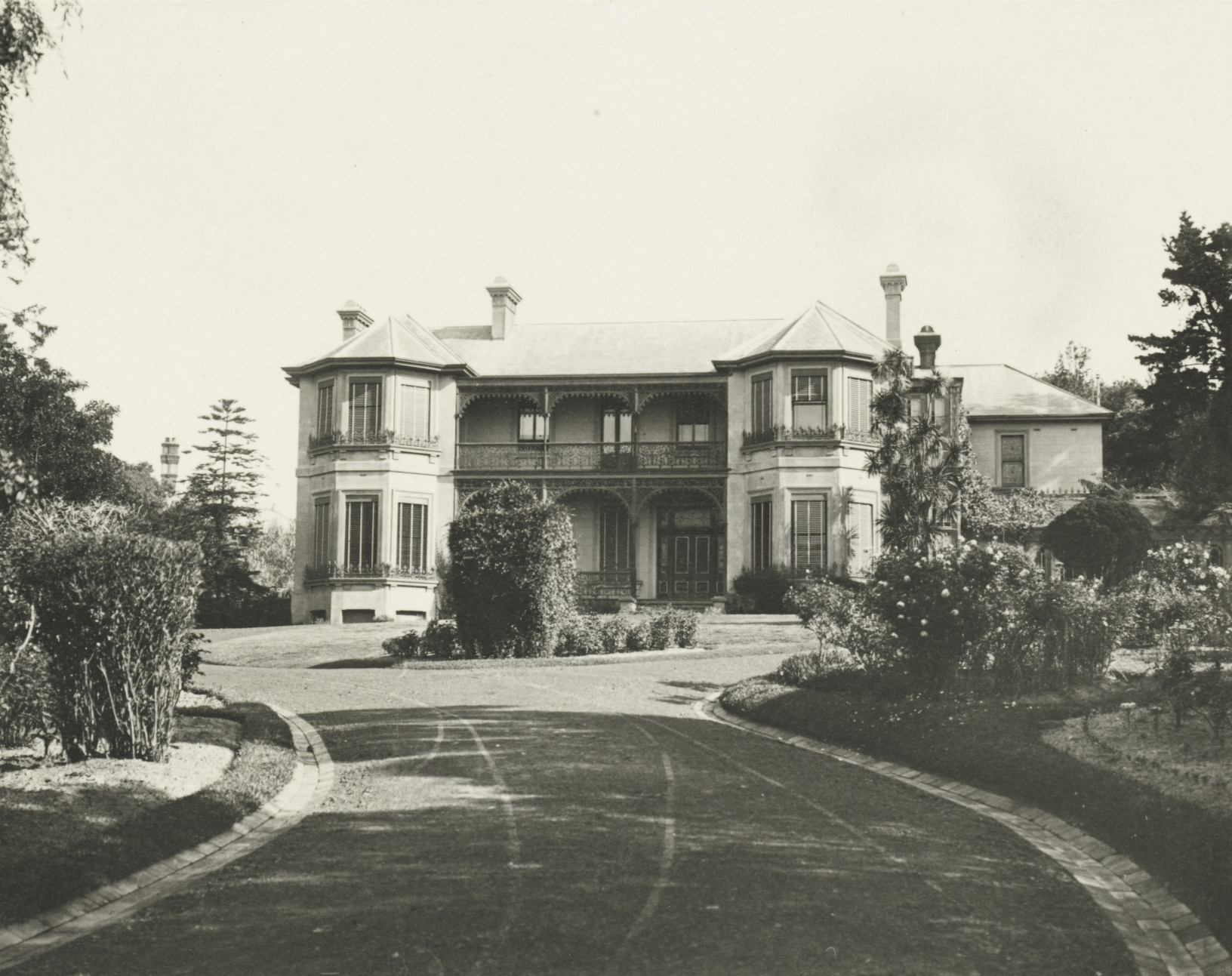
Merioola mansion as it appeared in 1911

The group took its name from Merioola, a Victorian-era mansion converted into a boarding house in the Sydney suburb of Woollahra, managed from 1941 by Chica Edgeworth Lowe. Lowe consciously encouraged artists, dancers, writers and theatre people to take up residence, forming the bohemian artistic centre of Sydney in the immediate post-war years.

Tenants included the European-born and trained artists Arthur Fleischmann (sculptor), Roland Strasser, Peter Kaiser, Michael Kmit and George de Olszanski. Others, such as Donald Friend, Edgar Ritchard (artist and costume designer), Loudon Sainthill (later to become one of the most prominent theatre designers of the 20th century) and his life partner Harry Tatlock Miller (writer, critic and curator and subsequently the director of the Redfern Galleries, London), had lived and worked overseas. Others connected with the visual arts included photographer Alec Murray, painters Justin O'Brien, Mary Edwards, Frank Andrews, artist and later noted costume designer Jocelyn Rickards. Other tenants included dancers Alison Lee, Darya Collin, Beatrijs Vitringa and Edmee Monod, author and historian Hector Bolitho, architect George Beiers, civil engineer William Pierre Beiers, mathematician and astronomer John Sidgewick, musicians John and Norma Bannenberg, and many others.

When in Sydney, Ballet Rambert dancers often spent time at Merioola, where many theatrical and literary collaborations took place.

== Merioola and the Sydney Charm School ==
Although there was no common style or 'movement' at Merioola, it could be said that its artists were more interested in art as a light-hearted and poetic expression of the spirit and less interested in art as a progressive force. Many of the group had spent long years in the armed services or had been displaced persons as a result of the war in Europe.

Artists under the label of the "Merioola Group" exhibited in both Sydney (November 1947) and Melbourne in 1947.

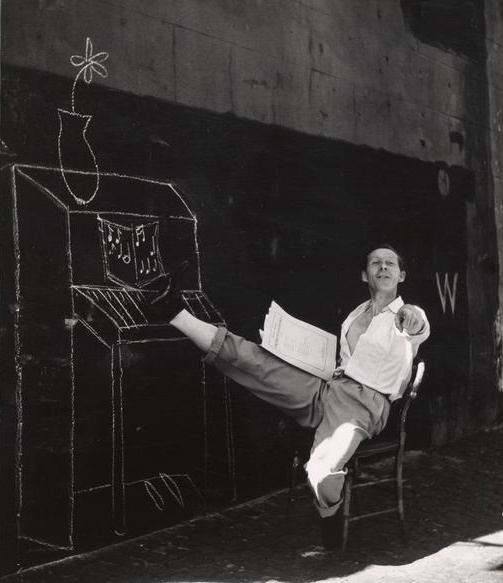
Ballet Rambert dancer Walter Gore at Merioola, 1948

The "Sydney Charm School" was another term used synonymously to refer to the Merioola group of artists because they shared a light-hearted, decorative element in their work. The Sydney Charm School included painters William Dobell, Russell Drysdale, Donald Friend, Lloyd Rees, Justin O'Brien, Jean Bellette, Paul Haefliger, David Strachan, Sali Herman, Eric Wilson, Mary Edwell-Burke, Margaret Olley, Roland Strasser, Michael Kmit, Peter Kaiser, Harry Tatlock Miller, Jocelyn Rickards, Adrian Feint, Arthur Fleischmann, Eileen Haxton and applied artists Wallace Thornton, Loudon Sainthill and Wolfgang Cardamatis.

Paul Haefliger first used the phrase "Charm School" in 1948 in a review of the work of Jocelyn Rickards. Titled ‘Artist Relies on Charm’, Haefliger's review states that Rickard's work "certainly belongs to the charm-school and, as a substitute, it will carry this young artist quite a distance".

Later, the name "The Sydney Charm School" was disparagingly used by Australian Art critic Robert Hughes to describe the Merioola group of artists. He believed that the art made in Sydney in the period circa 1940–1955 was less worthy than the works produced in Melbourne as it was decorative and overly romantic, unlike the "truthful vital energy of Melbourne". Regarding the difference in art expressions between Sydney and Melbourne at that time Donald Friend commented:

Melbourne during the war and after the war went in quite heavily for social realism, which is a kind of expression of resentment against being poor and other people being poor. Sydney artists were poor. They enjoyed themselves in their attics. They were drinking plonk and eating crusts of bread... the usual thing... We didn't think of resenting it. We had a bloody marvellous time and we did all sorts of interesting things. Sydney extroverted sort of things – plenty of laughter and plenty of laughter in the paintings.

By its ad hoc nature the Merioola Group were destined not to last, and by the mid-1950s its original members had left or were on the point of leaving, most overseas. But while it lasted Merioola provided a bohemian atmosphere, described by its chronicler Christine France:

In post-war Sydney, Merioola was probably the most exciting place to live. Justin O'Brien said, "I've never laughed so much, not at people but with people". Merioola was always full of visitors; both local and overseas artists would call in [and] the mix of creative people at Merioola often led to interdisciplinary activities. The dancers would pose for [Arthur] Fleischmann or Alec Murray. The artists would make sets for theatrical activities. And Harry [Tatlock Miller] and Loudon [Sainthill] and Alec [Murray] would combine their talents as editor, designer and photographer for Ballet Rambert and Old Vic programs.

== See also ==
Art of Australia

== Bibliography ==
Merioola and After (Christine France, 1986)
