= Gil Docking =

Australian arts administrator

- Born: Bendigo, Victoria
- Died: 17 November 2015
- Known for: Director of the Newcastle Art Gallery and Auckland Art Gallery
- Spouse: Shay Docking
- Awards: OAM

Gilbert (Gil) Charles Docking OAM (16 February 1919 – 17 November 2015) was an Australian arts administrator, founding director of the Newcastle Art Gallery, director of the Auckland City Art Gallery (1965–1972) and senior education officer and acting director of the Art Gallery of New South Wales (1972–1982).

== Early life ==
Docking was born in 1919 in Bendigo, Victoria to George Docking and Gertrude Docking (née Ebbott). He went to school at Melbourne Boys High and won a scholarship for Industrial Design at the Royal Melbourne Institute of Technology. His first job on graduating was as an industrial designer for a glass factory, but his upbringing in the Methodist faith led him to attend a training college for Methodist Home Missionaries. He was then posted to serve in the circuit of Omeo, an historic Gippsland gold mining town in Eastern Victoria. In 1942, aged 23, Docking enlisted in the Royal Australian Air Force and was based in the UK where he was involved in coastal defence as the navigator on a Bristol Beaufighter. Flying off the Dutch coast in 1944, the plane was hit and Docking and the pilot ended up in a rubber dingy in the North Sea. The two men were picked up by a German torpedo boat and spent the rest of their war in a German prisoner of war camp. They were liberated by Russian forces in 1945. You can read the illustrated diary Docking kept during his imprisonment here. After the war Docking attended Melbourne University to study Fine Arts and Philosophy, graduating in 1951 with a BA. Three years later he married artist Sheila (Shay) Lawson. At this time the couple turned to Anglo-Catholicism sharing a love of its liturgy, music and images.

== Art museum career ==
=== National Gallery of Victoria ===
In 1952 Docking was appointed education officer at the National Gallery of Victoria with responsibility for touring exhibitions throughout the state. On occasion he was accompanied by Shay Docking who used the opportunity to paint the landscape. Docking left the Gallery in 1956 and spent the next two years teaching at Mt Scopus Memorial College.

=== Newcastle Art Gallery ===
In 1958 Docking was invited to be the inaugural director of the Newcastle Art Gallery. Based on his experience gained traveling throughout New South Wales, Docking brought to his new role an overview of how regional art galleries could best evolve. Working with contacts made at the National Gallery of Victoria he began to amass a significant collection. Many of the works were received as gifts including important paintings like Portrait of a strapper 1941 by William Dobell. Docking also championed the young artist Brett Whiteley and in 1959 the Newcastle Art Gallery became the first public institution to purchase his work.

=== Auckland City Art Gallery ===
In 1965 Docking took up the position of director at the Auckland City Art Gallery becoming its third director after Eric Westbrook and Peter Tomory. One of his early actions was to initiate a small but select collection of Gothic art. This was the beginning of a number of important purchases which included a number of significant works by New Zealand artists: Rita Angus's Portrait of Betty Curnow 1942, Gordon Walters Painting No 1 1965, Colin McCahon The Marys at the Tomb 1947, Michael Smither Rocks with Mountain 1968, and Doris Lusk's The Pumping Station 1958. He was also responsible for the acquisition of 37 works by Henry Fuseli.

Early in his directorship Docking became involved in a project that almost doubled the size of the Auckland City Art Gallery's exhibition spaces and significantly updated its exhibition style. In 1967 the Gallery had received a large bequest from the Philip Augustus Edmiston Trust. This supported a major extension to the building, initially through the addition of the Edmiston Wing and a new sculpture garden. The extension was opened in 1975, the Gallery's centennial year.

Docking was closely involved with the exhibition programme over his directorship. A selection from the programme at this time included:

- 1967 Marcel Duchamp: 78 Works The Mary Sisler Collection. Docking himself described securing this comprehensive exhibition of Duchamp's work as a result of a ‘shot-in-the-dark. A letter to a New York dealer culminated in one of the world's most important collection of the French artists work to tour New Zealand.
- 1969 Frances Hodgkins 1869-1947: A Centenary Exhibition. New Zealand's Queen Elizabeth II Arts Council commissioned Docking and Hodgkins expert E.H. McCormick to develop a ‘comprehensive exhibition’ to mark the centenary of the artist's birth.
- 1970 New Zealand Art of the Sixties: A Royal Visit Exhibition.
- 1971 Ten Big Paintings. The exhibition opened the new Edmiston Wing along with New Zealand Young Contemporaries Auckland: Auckland City Art Gallery. The latter exhibition was curated by Docking with the support of Colin McCahon ‘who very generously assisted with the preliminary selection of works’ the exhibition represented 51 artists under the age of 31.’
- 1972 Colin McCahon: A Survey.

While director of the Auckland City Art Gallery Docking also wrote a comprehensive book covering the history of New Zealand painting. Published in 1971 Two Hundred Years of New Zealand Painting joined Gordon H. Brown and Hamish Keith's An Introduction to New Zealand Painting (1969) as an influential record of art in the country. Art writer Peter Ireland described it as adding, ‘a first floor to Brown and Keith's foundations.’ Docking's book has been republished twice with significant additions as Two hundred and Forty years of New Zealand Painting and Two Hundred and Fifty Years of New Zealand Painting.

Docking was also known as a strong advocate for the arts in New Zealand. Writer Alan Brunton described Docking as ‘a battler’ reporting his public criticism of arts institutions like the Arts Council as being more focussed on a ‘search for kudos and prestige’ than they were in arts administration.’

=== Art Gallery of New South Wales ===
In 1972 Docking moved to the Art Gallery of New South Wales in Sydney to take up the position of senior education officer. He then served as deputy director and for a period as acting director. He retired in 1982 and died in 2015.

== Awards ==
In 2014 Docking was awarded a Medal of the Order of Australia (OAM) for service to the arts.
