= Society of Artists (Australia) =

Art society from Sydney, Australia

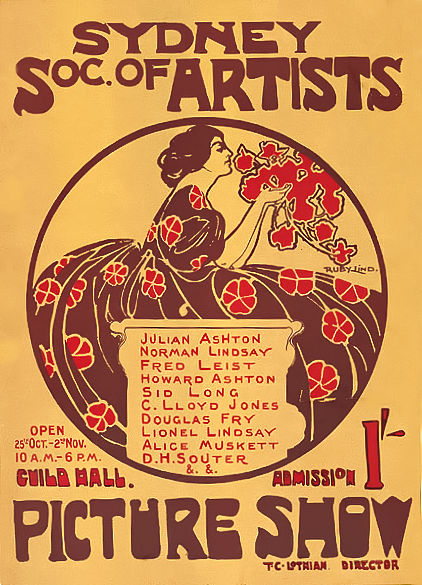
- Poster designed by Ruby Lindsay for the Society's 1907 exhibition.
- Formation: 1895
- Dissolved: 1965
- Type: Artist collective
- Headquarters: Sydney
- Region served: Australia, but mainly in Sydney
- 1st Chairman: Tom Roberts

The Society of Artists was an influential Sydney based group of progressive artists who staged annual exhibitions from 1895 to the 1960s. The Society included many of Australia's best artists of the time. It lapsed during the mid 1960s.

== History ==
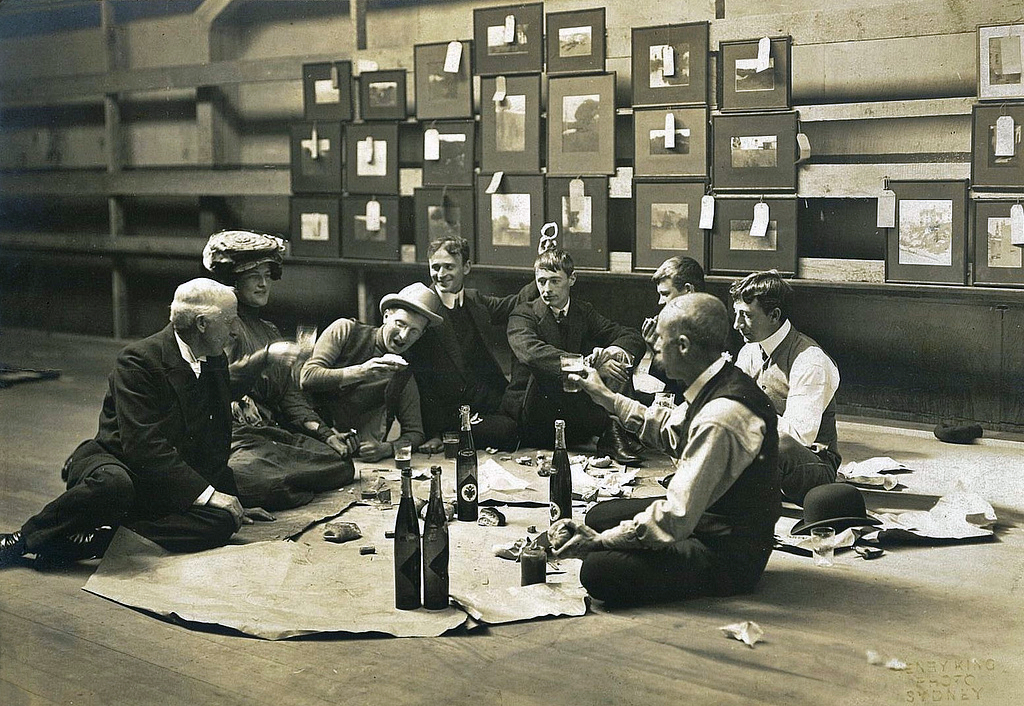
Society of Artists' Selection Committee, 1907 — group of artists including Julian Ashton (left) and Norman Lindsay (5th from left).

In 1888, the artist Tom Roberts established the Victorian Artists' Society, but he and Arthur Streeton moved to Sydney in 1891 during an economic depression in Melbourne. Roberts then formed the "Society of Artists" in Sydney in 1895 as a breakaway group from the Royal Art Society of NSW as a protest by avant-garde artists who believed that the general body of members should have a vote in choosing the committee of selection for annual shows,. As well the formation of the new Society was a protest against what they considered to be the cramping effect of the old unchanging tradition that photographic realism was the essential of good art and a desire to limit the membership to more professional painters.

The Society of Artists' foundation sought a more progressive and contemporary version of English art, similar to the New English Art Club. Many of the Society's early executives were in some way influenced by Henry Tonks, Walter Sickert and their English fellows.

The Society of Artists' first exhibition, in 1895, was inaugurated by Sir Henry Parkes.

In 1897, the Society of Artists secured a Government subsidy of £400 a year, which was later raised to £500. This enabled the painters to rent a gallery in Pitt Street, Sydney, and also to offer a travelling scholarship of £150 a year for three years to the best student of the year. Recipients of the Society's travelling scholarship included people like William Dobell, who later became famous artists.

Sydney Ure Smith was President of the Society from 1921 to 1948 and during this time he encouraged new members and advocated measured progress in Australian art. Together with George Washington Lambert he helped to keep the Society liberal and supported the award of the Society's travelling scholarship to young artists. Ure Smith arranged the Society's controversial 1923 Exhibition of Australian Art in London — which attracted controversy because a group of Victorian artists wanted to remove Norman Lindsay's works as being "immoral" and applied for a court injunction to prevent the exhibition leaving Australia without further selections.

The "Press and Arts Club", a supper club of the Society of Artists was a bohemian club also founded and presided over by Tom Roberts. It was established for professional painters and illustrators, as opposed to some of the older art societies, which were dominated by laymen. It met monthly at the Cafe Frangois in George Street, Sydney. The Supper Club was described by artist George Taylor as a "glorious, wonderful feast of song, sketch and story that would follow the feast of beefsteak".

From its inception in 1895, the Society held various functions to augment money for its travelling scholarship including an annual Artists' Ball, children's parties and an Art Union and these as well as afternoon teas to entertain women were often held at the same time as the Society's art exhibitions.

The Society's publications included annual exhibition catalogues and books such as Amy Lambert's Thirty Years of an Artist's Life, a book about her husband (George Washington Lambert) and his career, and the Anzac Memorial Building N.S.W about the sculptures by Rayner Hoff in the ANZAC War Memorial in Sydney. The Society also awarded medals to encourage 'good service for the advancement of Australian art'.

David Edgar Strachan was the last president (1965) of the Society, after which it folded.

== Membership ==
The Society of Artists included artists from all over Australia. The Society stated in its 1946 exhibition catalogue that the only qualification for membership being:

...competence, but at a high level not only of technique but of thought. It must be remembered that a good artist puts on canvas only what he has thought about deeply and unceasingly both as to content and technique and especially as to significance in the world of life and nature. The merit of all those elected to the Society has been always an individuality of approach and expression, content being subordinate to the thought.

== Exhibitions ==
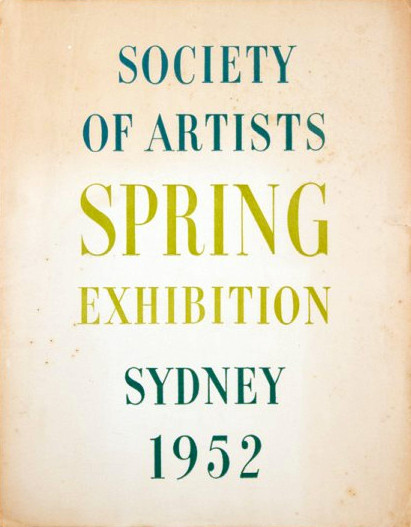
Catalogue cover for the Society's 1952 exhibition.

The first exhibition by the Society was held in 1895 and included works by some Australia's best artists of the time including: Julian Ashton, Margaret Fleming, Frank P. Mahony, Emily Meston, Tom Roberts and Arthur Streeton. Theodora Cowan was a regular exhibitor. Other 19th century exhibitors were Howard Ashton, W. F. Hughes, C. Lloyd Jones, G. W. Lambert, Sid Long, Edith Loudon, Mildred Rivett, A. Dattilo Rubbo, Hall Thorpe and J. S. Watkins

The Society of Artists organised annual exhibitions at which members could sell their works. Some of the outstanding exhibitions held by the Society included an exhibition of Arthur Streeton's work in 1920. The Society's regular venue was the Education Department's Art Gallery in Loftus Street, Sydney.

During the 1950s and 1960s, artists represented at the Society of Artists' annual exhibition included:

- Len Annois
- Jean Appleton
- Jean Bellette
- Nancy Borlase
- Judy Cassab
- John Coburn
- Noel Counihan
- William Dobell
- Russell Drysdale
- Adrian Feint
- Hector Gilliland
- James Gleeson
- Paul Haefliger
- Elaine Alys Haxton
- Nora Heysen
- Dorothy Thornhill
- Louis Kahan
- Michael Kmit
- Francis Lymburner
- Hal Missingham
- Arthur Murch
- Justin O'Brien
- Margaret Olley
- Desiderius Orban
- John Passmore
- Margaret Preston
- Thea Proctor
- Lloyd Rees
- John Santry
- Ivy Shore
- Jeffrey Smart
- Grace Cossington Smith
- Eric Thake
- Roland Wakelin
