= Rex Nan Kivell =

British/New Zealand art dealer and collector (1898–1977)

Sir Rex de Charembac Nan Kivell CMG (born Reginald Nankivell, 8 April 1898 – 7 June 1977) was a New Zealand-born British art collector and dealer. He was knighted on the recommendation of the government of Australia, a country he never visited, for the gift and sale to the National Library of Australia of his collection of books, paintings, prints, documents, manuscripts and artefacts relating to the history of Australia, New Zealand and the Pacific. He has been described as "an archetypal outsider – illegitimate, homosexual, self-educated and antipodean".

== Early life ==
Born as Reginald Nankivell in Christchurch, New Zealand, to an unmarried mother, he was raised in the home of his maternal grandparents. He was educated at New Brighton Public School and the Royal College of Science.

== Becoming a collector and dealer ==
As an under age youth and listing his profession as bookbinder, Reginald Nankivell enlisted with the New Zealand Expeditionary Force on 31 May 1916. He served in England (1916–1919) on the staff of No. 1 New Zealand Hospital General Hospital, Brockenhurst, Hampshire (part of his collection of photos was taken here) and at the New Zealand Command Depot, Codford, Wiltshire. On an extended period of leave in England, from October 1917 to May 1918, he began to pursue his growing antiquarian interests. Around 1918 he started to style himself Rex de Charembac Nan Kivell.

He attributed an early interest in collecting to Sydney Smith, an antiquarian book dealer in Christchurch whom Nan Kivell met while still at school. Nan Kivell was also inspired to read history and geography, especially works on European voyagers in the Pacific.

Patients and medical staff at No.1 New Zealand General Hospital, Brockenhurst

Nan Kivell worked on the La Tène archaeological excavations in Wiltshire, and presented the objects he unearthed to the Wiltshire Archaeological and Natural History Society Museum in Devizes.

Nan Kivell's association with the Redfern Gallery began in 1925. It had been founded two years earlier by two wealthy Englishmen and by 1931, Nan Kivell was managing director. He ran the gallery in association with his Australian business partner, Harry Tatlock Miller.

Through the Redfern Gallery, Nan Kivell encouraged and helped to establish many British artists including Henry Moore, Barbara Hepworth and Graham Sutherland. He also helped to introduce a number of important European artists to England such as Pierre Bonnard, Chaïm Soutine, Max Ernst, Pablo Picasso and Édouard Vuillard. He gave encouragement to an emerging generation of Australian painters and designers including Sidney Nolan and Loudon Sainthill.

Although living mainly in London, he also maintained a mansion named El Farah (Paradise) in Morocco, where he maintained a long-running sexual relationship with his local chauffeur.

Nan Kivell collected books, paintings, prints, documents, manuscripts and artefacts relating to the history of Australia, New Zealand and the Pacific.

Hunter, John, 1737–1821. Hottentot fig (Carpobrotus edulis) between 1788 and 1790, 1 watercolour; 22.6 x 18.3 cm. Part of Sketchbook Birds & flowers of New South Wales drawn on the spot in 1788, '89 & '90 1788–1790

Originally conceived as the basis of a pictorial history of Australia and New Zealand, Nan Kivell's collection began to extend beyond the purely pictorial. It came to encompass a whole range of documentary evidence created during the voyages of discovery, exploration and colonisation of the Antipodes in the seventeenth, eighteenth and nineteenth centuries, and the material produced as a result of those voyages. His collection also included Māori ceremonial war clubs, Māori language publications and manuscripts, emu eggs, scrimshaw, Aboriginal king plates, a compass and sundial and Thomas Baines’ magnificent painted lantern slides of the mid-1850s. By the late 1940s, Nan Kivell's collection had become substantial and was housed in various locations around England. In 1946, concerned about the safety and preservation of the collection, Nan Kivell began negotiations with representatives in London of the then Commonwealth National Library, the present day National Library of Australia (NLA). In 1949 the first consignment of pictures, books and other material reached Canberra on loan to the Library, which then sought, over a decade, to bring the collection into Australian ownership. In 1992, 32 works from the collection were placed on long-term loan to the National Gallery of Australia. This arrangement was ordered by the then Prime Minister of Australia, Paul Keating, after the National Gallery and National Library disputed ownership of the collection.

== Honours ==
On the recommendation of the Australian Government, Nan Kivell was appointed a Companion of the Order of St Michael and St George (CMG) in 1966 for "services to the Australian National Library". In 1976 he was made a Knight Bachelor, again by Australia. It has been suggested one of his motivations in selling his collection of Australiana at a fraction of its true value was to gain the knighthood he had long coveted for the purposes of social advancement.

== Death ==
He died on 7 June 1977 in Paddington, London and was buried in the parish churchyard at West Lavington, Wiltshire. He attempted to obscure his illegitimacy even beyond the grave, by having a false date of birth inscribed on his tomb.
