= Shay Docking =

Australian artist (1928–1998)

- Born: Shiela Lawson; 1928; Warrnambool, Victoria
- Died: 1998 (aged 69–70); Paddington, New South Wales
- Education: Swinburne Technical College
- Known for: landscape drawing, landscape painting
- Spouse: Gil Docking

Shay Docking (1928–1998) was an Australian artist who specialised in landscape drawing.

== Early life ==
Docking was born Shiela Lawson, in Warrnambool Victoria in 1928, and was the youngest of seven children. Her father was a clergyman and her mother a musician. In 1939 she moved to Boort.

== Work ==
Docking was a landscape painter. Most of her work was inspired by the western district of Victoria where she grew up. While in New Zealand she was inspired by the volcanoes. She produced a series of paintings inspired by the landscape of Ku-ring-gai Chase as well as a series inspired by Sydney Harbour.

Docking featured in an Exhibition of Paintings by Leading Victorian and Interstate Artists at the Australian Galleries, Melbourne in 1957. In 1960 she exhibited her work in group exhibitions in Sydney and Melbourne and in 1961 she held her first solo shows in the Argus Gallery and the Blaxland Gallery. From Tower Hill to One Tree Hill; Two Decades of Painting by Shay Docking opened at the Warrnambool Art Gallery and travelled to six other regional galleries in 1975. In 1982 the Art Gallery of New South Wales organised a travelling art exhibition of her work The Sydney Harbour Bridge 1932–1982. Hill and other Volcanoes, a survey exhibition was held at Warrnambool, Bendigo and Swan Hill Galleries in 1987. A major retrospective exhibition of Docking's work titled Song of Earth and Sea: Shay Docking 1955–1996 was held at Macquarie University Art Gallery in 2011 and at the Maitland Regional Gallery in 2013. An exhibition of her work drawn from the Newcastle Art Gallery was held in 2012.

Examples of Docking's work are displayed at the National Gallery of Australia in Canberra, the National Gallery of Victoria, and the Art Gallery of New South Wales.

== Personal life and death ==
She studied at Swinburne Technical College between 1947 and 1950. Before finishing her training she accepted a freelance position illustrating myths and legends for the Victorian Education Department's visual education section. In 1952 she married [Gil Docking] and changed her name to Shay Docking In 1953 she became the Education Officer at the National Gallery of Victoria. In 1958 she moved to Newcastle. In 1965 she moved to New Zealand. In 1965 she purchased 69 Cambridge Street, Paddington. She returned to the terraced house in 1971 which became her studio. In 2015 the house was gifted to the Art Gallery of New South Wales. In 1979 she was awarded the Gold Coast Purchase Award and Trustees Invitation Purchase Award from the Queensland Art Gallery. In 1987 artist Margaret Ackland painted a portrait of Docking for the Archibald Prize and was a finalist. The portrait won the Portia Geach Memorial Award the following year. She died in 1998 in Paddington. In 2019 she received a memorial plaque from Woollahra Council.

== Publications about her ==
- The monograph, Shay Docking: The Landscape as Metaphor with text by Ursula Prunster in association with the artist, published by AH & AW Reed, Sydney published in 1983
- Shay Docking Drawings by Lou Klepac, with an essay by Hendrik Kolenberg published by The Beagle Press, Sydney (1990)
- In 1987 she wrote Tower hill and other volcanoes to accompany a survey exhibition
- Docking, Gil with additions by Michael Dunn covering 1970–90. “Shay Docking” in Two Hundred Years of New Zealand Painting, David Bateman Ltd., New Zealand, 1990,
- Docking, Gil. A conversation with Shay Docking, Ascent, Journal of the Arts in New Zealand, Vol 1, No. 2, Caxton Press, Christchurch 1968: 20–29
- Simpson, Andrew. A journey into the textured lands of Shay Docking in Rhonda Davis and Leonard Janiszewski (eds.), Song of Earth and Sea: Shay Docking 1955–1996, Macquarie University, Sydney 2011
