= Jocelyn Rickards =

Australian artist and costume designer

- Born: 29 July 1924; Melbourne, Victoria, Australia
- Died: 7 July 2005 (aged 80); Virginia Water, England
- Occupation: Costume designer
- Years active: 1958–1988
- Spouses: Leonard Rosoman (m. 1963; div. 1970) Clive Donner (m. 1971)

Jocelyn Rickards (29 July 1924 – 7 July 2005) was an Australian artist and costume designer.

She was born in Melbourne in 1924, and moved to London as a young woman. During the 1940s to 1950s, she was one of the Merioola Group of artists. The review of her works in a 1948 exhibition by Paul Haefliger was the source of the coined phrase "The Charm School" to describe these Sydney artists.

In 1966 Rickards won a BAFTA Film Award for the film Mademoiselle.

In 1967 she was nominated at the 39th Academy Awards in the category of Best Costumes-Black and White for her work on the film Morgan – A Suitable Case for Treatment. Poor health led to an early end to her career as a designer, but she later taught costume design at the University of Southern California.

Rickards was married to Leonard Rosoman from 1963 until divorcing in 1970; the following year, she married Clive Donner. Her autobiography The Painted Banquet: My Life and Loves, was published in 1987 by Weidenfeld & Nicolson, and was praised thus by Graham Greene (a former lover of hers): "An outstanding capacity for friendship - rare in the jealous world of art and letters to which she belongs - makes Jocelyn Rickard's autobiography unusually appealing".

Rickards died from pneumonia at a care home in Virginia Water, Surrey, on 7 July 2005, at the age of 80.

== Selected filmography ==
- From Russia with Love (1963)
- Blowup (1966)
- Mademoiselle (1966)
- Morgan – A Suitable Case for Treatment (1966)
- The Sailor from Gibraltar (1967)
- Ryan's Daughter (1970)
- Sunday Bloody Sunday (1971)
- Charlie Chan and the Curse of the Dragon Queen (1981)
