= Justin O'Brien =

Australian painter (1917–1996)

Justin O'Brien AM
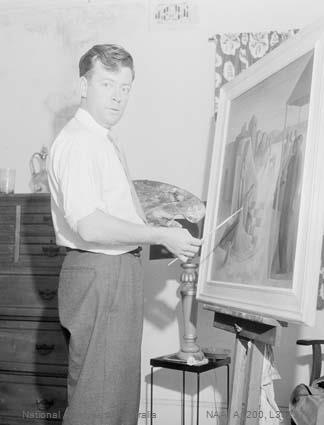
- O'Brien in 1953
- Born: Justin Maurice O'Brien; 2 August 1917; Hurstville, New South Wales
- Died: 25 January 1996 (aged 78); Rome
- Known for: Religious art, portraiture
- Awards: Blake Prize (1951)

Justin Maurice O'Brien (2 August 1917 – 25 January 1996) was an Australian artist and teacher who was known both for religious art and portraiture. His art was heavily influenced by his service in World War II, in which he became a prisoner or war, and the trauma he experienced as a part of this.

He won the inaugural Blake Prize in 1951 and completed many significant pieces of art work at churches throughout Europe and Australia. This was despite no longer holding religious beliefs and identifying as agnostic.

== Early life ==
O'Brien was born in Hurstville, a suburb of Sydney, and was the third of five children born to his parents Maurice Joseph and Teresa Mary (née Sherin) O'Brien. They were a devout Irish-Catholic family and, from a young age, his parents fostered his interest in music, theatre and the arts more generally. O'Brien first realised he wanted to be a painter when, at six years old, he was gifted with chalks, pencils and books on how to draw by his aunt.

When in secondary school, while attending the Christian Brothers’ College in Waverley, he began being tutored by Edward M Smith who was a respected art teacher and critic. The next year, when only 14 he left school and became Smith's apprentice for the next four years. After completing this apprenticeship he began teaching art classes independently at Catholic Schools around Sydney.

During this period he also entered and was a finalist in the Archibald Prize in 1937, 1938 and 1939. He also joined the Contemporary Art Society and the Fra Angelico Art Guild.

== World War II service ==
On 31 May 1940 O'Brien volunteered and enlisted in the Australian Imperial Force where he was a nursing orderly with the 2/5th Australian General Hospital and was posted briefly to Palestine until being transferred to Ekali (Greece) in April 1941. This are was soon a part of the Axis occupation of Greece and the hospital continued to operate under German control. This made O'Brien a prisoner of war and, in January 1942, he was transported to Stalag XX-A in German occupied Poland.

While at the camp O'Brien was a part of the camp's theatre group, facilitated art classes for fellow prisoners and was able to paint with supplies that were sent to them by voluntary aid organisations. While at the camp he also befriended fellow artists Austen Deans and Jesse Martin. One of the pieces of art created during this time was Self-portrait (1941), which is now held by the Art Gallery of New South Wales which is one of his few examples of realism.

In October 1943 he and Martin were a part of a prisoner exchange and, via Barcelona, returned to Sydney where he began working at the 113th Australian General Hospital. In March 1944 he and Martin held a joint exhibition at the Macquarie Galleries which is believed to have been the first exhibition held by returned servicemen in Australia.

On 27 July 1945 O'Brien was discharged from the army.

== Career ==
After the war O'Brien begun working as an art teacher at the Cranbrook School in Bellevue Hill while he continued to paint and exhibit outside of this role. In 1946 he became part of the Merioola Group and lived with them at Merioola, a large boarding house alongside many other artists. He remained there until 1948 and he called this period "one of the happiest and most formative of his life".

In 1948 O'Brien took a sabbatical from the school and travelled to Europe where, based from London, he spent time in Spain, France, and Italy. In 1949 he held a solo exhibition at Hanover Gallery.

He returned to Sydney, and his role at Cranbrook in 1950 and, in 1951, he won the inaugural Blake Prize for religious art for his work The Virgin Enthroned. Following winning this award he received numerous commissions for other pieces for Australian churches. In 1962 he was also awarded the Darcy Morris Memorial Prise for his work The Virgin Enthroned. Despite his success as a religious painter O'Brien himself described himself as a 'painter of religious subjects' and he was agnostic. His focus on religious imagery was likely influenced by the suffering he had witnessed in war and that the use of biblical imagery helped him to convey universal themes.

O'Brien's move away from Catholicism may have been influenced by his homosexuality, which he began exploring in mid-life. Curator Barry Pearce said of this:

[H]e painted sweet confections of the human condition but I think he painted them as a balm for something inside himself. He held himself back sexually for a reason—partly because it was forbidden by the Catholic Church and partly because it was illegal.

— Barry Pearce, Fulfilled pledge caps curator's career, 17 December 2010, Sydney Morning Herald

In 1963, on another period of leave, O'Brien travelled to Europe and spent a number of months in Greece where he lived on Skyros with painters Jeffrey Smart and Brian Dunlop. Together they leased a fisherman's cottage and, after a hugely successful exhibition featuring his art from this time in mid-1965 O'Brien decided to resign from his teaching position and return to Europe to focus on his painting full-time.

O'Brien initially spent move time in Sykrons before moving to Rome, initially for a short time, to create a mosaic at the Basilica of the Annunciation. Despite this he continued to return to Australia regularly to stage exhibitions.

O'Brien was made a Member of the Order of Australia (AM) in the 1992 Queen's Birthday Honours for service to art.

He died on 17 January 1996 of bone cancer.

== Collections and legacy ==
O'Brien's works are held in the collections of the National Gallery of Australia, the Art Gallery of New South Wales, the National Gallery of Victoria, the Art Gallery of South Australia, the Art Gallery of Western Australia, the University of Sydney and the University of Southern Queensland.

The National Portrait Gallery in Australia holds a number of portraits of O'Brien.

O'Brien is the subject of a 2020 episode of the Australian Broadcasting Corporation series Compass entitled: Justin O’Brien – The Sacred Music Of Colour.
