= J. S. Watkins =

John Samuel Watkins (1866 – 25 August 1942), generally referred to as J. S. Watkins or "Watty" to his students, was an artist who for forty years ran his own art school in Sydney, Australia.

== Biography ==
Watkins was born in Wolverhampton, England, and studied at the South Kensington Art School in London.

He arrived in Sydney in 1882, and undertook further studies at the Royal Art Society of New South Wales (RAS) school under Julian Ashton, A. J. Daplyn and Frank P. Mahony.

For many years the J. S. Watkins Art School was located at Margaret Street, Sydney. Edward Lee Holloway was one instructor.

He was a member of the (New South Wales) Society of Artists from 1895 and a member of RAS and a trustee of the Art Gallery of New South Wales from 1932 to 1942.

Representative works are held at the National Gallery of New South Wales and the Art Gallery of South Australia.

== Recognition ==
Erik Langker, a former student, wrote of Watkins:

'Watty' inspired and enthused us. He encouraged us to cultivate our own outlook rather than to follow any particular style. He was essentially a draughtsman more than a painter. He was just as interested in music as in art and he was widely read on an astonishing variety of subjects.

A leading critic echoed Langker's appraisal of Watkins' work.

A retrospective exhibition of some 60 of his works was held at the National Art Gallery in June 1943.
