= John Henry Young =

Art collector, dealer, and gallery director (1880–1946)

John Henry Young (27 October 1880 – 7 September 1946) was an Australian art collector, art dealer and art gallery director. Young was born in Petersham, Sydney, New South Wales and died in North Sydney, New South Wales.

He is noted for serving as acting director of the Art Gallery of New South Wales 1944–1945 between the incumbencies of Will Ashton and Hal Missingham.

== See also ==
- Sir Carleton Kemp Allen
- Sydney George Ure Smith
- Roland Shakespeare Wakelin
- Percy Alexander Leason
- Roy De Maistre
- Basil Burdett
- Sir William Dobell
- Robert Richmond Campbell

Cultural offices
Preceded by Will Ashton	Director and Secretary of the Art Gallery of New South Wales (temporary appointment); 1944–1945	Succeeded by Hal Missingham
