= Hal Missingham =

Australian artist

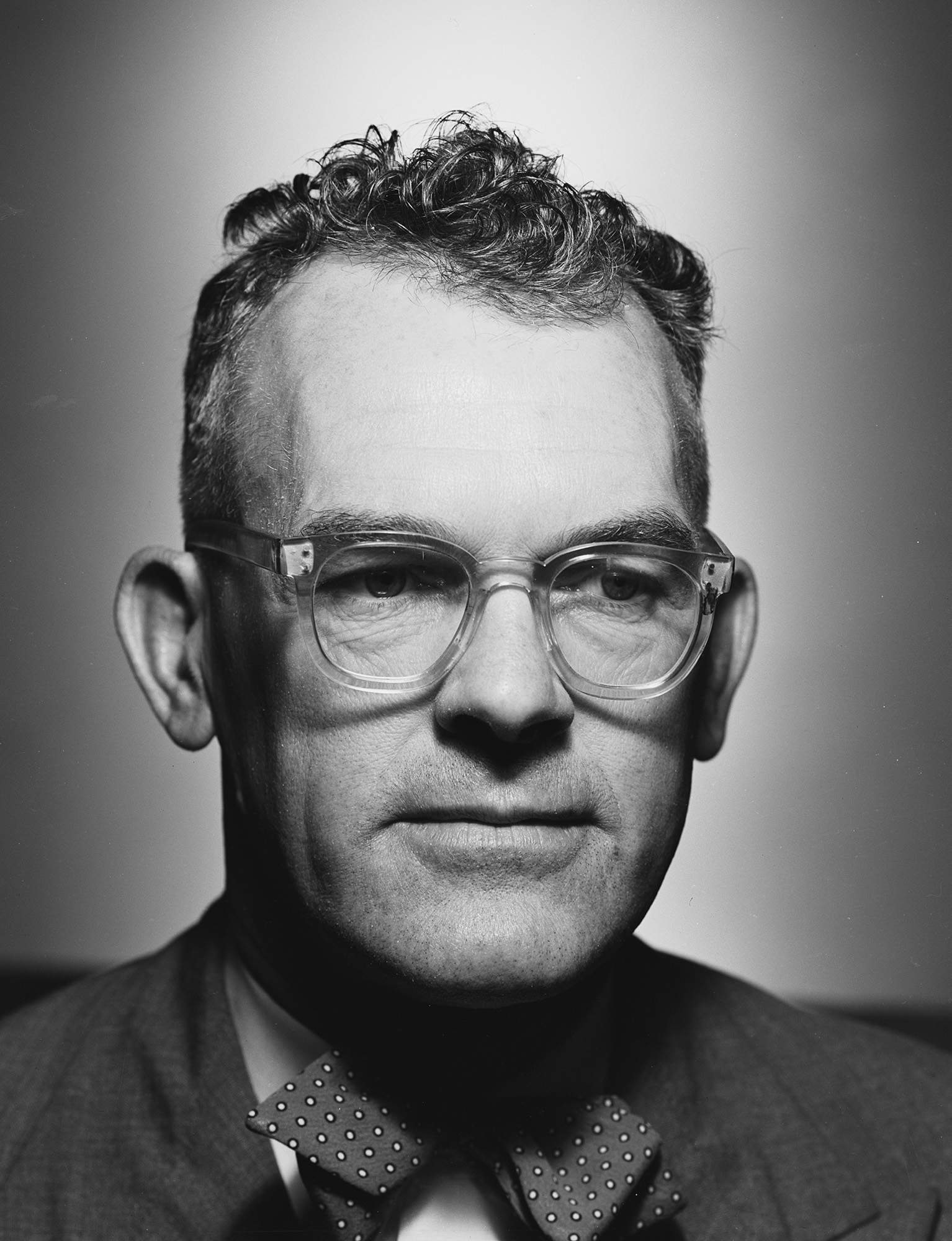
- Portrait of Hal Missingham, December 1950, by Max Dupain
- Born: Harold Missingham; 8 December 1906; Claremont, Western Australia
- Died: 9 April 1994 (aged 87); Perth, Western Australia
- Known for: Painter, Photographer
- Movement: Realism
- Awards: Officer of the Order of Australia

Harold "Hal" Missingham AO (8 December 1906 – 9 April 1994) was an Australian artist, Director of the Art Gallery of New South Wales from 1945 to 1971, and president of the Australian Watercolour Institute from 1952 to 1955.

== Early life ==
Born in Claremont, Western Australia, Missingham was educated at Perth Boys' School, and later undertook an apprenticeship to the process engraver J. Gibney and Son in 1922. He studied drawing at Perth Technical School, attended art schools in both Paris (1926) and London (1926–1932).

From 1927 to 1928 Missingham worked in Canada as a freelance artist and teacher. Before World War II he studied in Perth, Paris and London, where he became friendly with a number of leading artists and developed an interest in photography. He returned to Sydney in 1941 and after serving as a Signalman in the Second Australian Imperial Force helped to found the Studio of Realist Art.

== Art Gallery of New South Wales ==
Missingham on the ABC in 1964 explaining the design process for the new Australian decimal coins.

In 1945 he was appointed Director of the Art Gallery of New South Wales, (Note: The Art Gallery's official title between 1883 and 1958 was the National Art Gallery of New South Wales.) a post he retained until 1971. The previous incumbent was Will Ashton, who resigned in 1943, Ashton and John Young serving as acting directors until Missingham's appointment. He oversaw the expansion of the gallery including the construction of the Captain Cook Wing from 1968 to 1970. His collection policy made an outstanding contribution to Australian contemporary art and he was responsible for bringing a number of influential international exhibitions to the country. His memoirs, They Kill You in the End, were published in 1971 Missingham was the longest serving director of the gallery until Edmund Capon.

== Honours and awards ==
Missingham was appointed an Officer of the Order of Australia on 26 January 1978 for service to arts, particularly as Director of the Art Gallery of New South Wales.

== Retirement ==
He retired to Darlington, in the hills east of Perth, where his personal collection of paintings and photographs was destroyed by fire in 1986. He died in 1994.

He was survived by his wife Esther (née Long) 1911–2013 to whom he was married for over 50 years. Esther died on 16 October 2013 aged 102.

== Selected works ==
- Missingham, Hal (1954), Hal Missingham sketch book, Dymock's Book Arcade
- Missingham, Hal; Festival of Perth (26th : 1978) (1978), Photographs : here and there, [Perth, W.A.]
- Missingham, Hal; Drysdale, Russell Sir, 1912-1981 (1969), My Australia, Collins
- Missingham, Hal (1970), Australia close focus : the colour and texture of a continent, Ure Smith
- Missingham, Hal (1978), Design focus, Van Nostrand Reinhold Australia, ISBN 978-0-442-25023-2

== Notes and references ==
Cultural offices
| Preceded by John Henry Young as temporary appointment | Director and Secretary of the Art Gallery of New South Wales; 1945–1971 | Succeeded by Peter Laverty as Director of the Art Gallery of New South Wales |
