= Royal Drawing Society =

Defunct British charity for art pedagogy

The Royal Drawing Society of Great Britain and Ireland was founded in 1888 in London, with the aim of teaching drawing for educational reasons.

The methods of instruction were based on the idea that very young children attempt to draw before they can write. They have very astute perception and retentive memory. The society aimed at using drawing as a means of developing these characteristics of children. It promoted the teaching of drawing in schools.

Lord Leighton, Sir John Millais, and Sir Edward Burne-Jones aided in the society's activities.

The society awarded the first annual scholarship in 1892 to a Miss F M Price.

The society ran an annual children's art exhibition from 1895 in London, in 1978 this was taken over by the Federation of British Artists but they announced in 1980 that they did not have the funds to continue to run the exhibition. As well as the exhibition the Federation also took over the other functions of the society.
