= Macquarie Galleries =

Sydney art gallery

Macquarie Galleries is a Sydney private art gallery established in 1925 by John Henry Young and Basil Burdett. It was located at "Strathkyle", 19 Bligh Street Sydney then moved to 40 King Street in 1945. From 1991 to 1993 it was located at 83–85 McLachlan Avenue, Rushcutters Bay. It is currently located at 585 Grosvenor Place, Sydney. There are also associated Macquarie Galleries in Canberra and Perth.

Basil Burdett left in 1935 or 1936 to become art critic for the Melbourne Herald. A E J L McDonnell became a partner around 1928. From 1939 to 1956 (59?) Lucy Swanton and Treania Smith (known as 'The bitches of Bligh St') ran the gallery; then Treania Smith and Mary Killen.

Artists who have had major exhibitions include:

- John Beard (various dates 1985–91)
- Les Blakebrough (1964–88)
- Robert Boynes (1985–93)
- Rupert Bunny (1940–62)
- James Cant (1940)
- John Coburn (1958–70)
- Ray Crooke (1962–70)
- Russell Drysdale (1942–61)
- Ian Fairweather (1948–70 and posthumous exhibition 1975)
- Graham Fransella (1983–90)
- Donald Friend
- James Gleeson (1950–70)
- Thomas Gleghorn (1959)
- Frank Hinder (1944–64)
- Jeff Makin (1969–92)
- Godfrey Miller
- Max Miller (1985–91)
- Idris Murphy (1972–89)
- Hilda Rix Nicholas (1978)
- Justin O'Brien (1950–82)
- Bernard Ollis (1977–92)
- John Olsen
- Desiderius Orban (1946–59)
- Jenny Orchard (1986–92)
- David Rankin (1971–90)
- Alison Rehfisch (1933–58)
- Jeff Rigby (1976–93)
- Jeffrey Smart (1955–71)
- Helen Stewart (1900-83)
- Eric L. Stewart (1972, posthumous)
- Hossein Valamanesh (1984–92)
- Roland Wakelin (first exhibitor, returning frequently, posthumous exhibition 1972)
- Guy Warren (1964–91)
- Salvatore Zofrea (1967–92)

== Publications ==
The National Library of Australia holds copies of limited edition booklets published by Macquarie Galleries in conjunction with exhibitions of works by

- Justin O'Brien 1980? ISBN 0-9595836-3-7
- John Beard 1988 ISBN 0-9595836-8-8

and 1991 ISBN 1-875365-04-4

- Russell Drysdale 1949
- Dušan Marek by Bernice Murphy 1979 ISBN 0-9595836-1-0
- Fred Cress 1989
- Rafael Gurvich 1979 ISBN 0-9595836-2-9
- Lionel Lindsay 1927
