= Paul Haefliger =

Swiss-Australian abstract painter, art critic, writer and printmaker

- Born: 8 February 1914; Frankfurt, German Empire
- Died: March 1982 (aged 68); Bern, Switzerland
- Education: Julian Ashton Art School; Westminster School of Art; Académie Colarossi; Académie de la Grande Chaumière

Paul Haefliger (8 February 1914 – March 1982) was an abstract painter, art critic, writer and printmaker.

He was a major figures in the Sydney art world in the 1940s and 1950s and writing for Art in Australia and the Sydney Morning Herald he was amongst Australian art critics who helped mould the standards of the nation's art during this period.

== Biography ==
Paul Haefliger was born on 8 February 1914 in Frankfurt, Germany of Swiss parents. His father was a businessman and the Honorary Swiss consul general in Frankfurt during the 1930s. His mother was a painter and he had uncles in Bern who were art connoisseurs and collectors of modern art. Haefliger attended school in Germany and Switzerland.

In 1930 he moved to Australia where his mother hoped he would become a wool sorter. He was more interested in art and in the 1930s studied at the Julian Ashton Art School in Sydney. In 1935 he married artist Jean Bellette. From 1936 he travelled to Europe and studied at the Westminster School of Art in London under Bernard Meninsky and Mark Gertler; the Académie Colarossi and the Académie de la Grande Chaumière in Paris. His study tours of Japan, India, Britain and Europe, gave him an opportunity to study woodcutting and printmaking.

Paul Haefliger returned to Australia in 1939 and assisted editor Peter Bellew with the magazine Art in Australia. In 1941 he was appointed art critic for the Sydney Morning Herald, a position he held until 1957. One of this earliest critiques was of Russell Drysdale's first Sydney exhibition in 1942. Although Haefliger's reviews did not carry his name, most people knew who 'Our Art Critic' was. In 1944 he was called as a witness for the defence in the court case arising from the controversial William Dobell entry in the Archibald Prize Competition in 1943.

Haefliger was a foundation member of the "Sydney Group of Artists" in 1945 and coined the name "Charm School" in a review of the work of Jocelyn Rickards in October 1948. Titled 'Artist Relies on Charm', Haefliger's review states that Rickard's work "certainly belongs to the charm-school and, as a substitute, it will carry this young artist quite a distance". They term "Charm School" eventually came to be used in a pejorative way, to refer to several of the artists who were part of the Sydney Group of Artists.

In 1957 Haefliger left Australia with his artist wife Jean Bellete to live overseas, mostly in Majorca, Spain, though he still visited Australia periodically to exhibit. He died in March 1982 in Switzerland during an amputation operation on his leg.

Haefliger's only book was Duet for Dulcimer and Dunce, published in 1979 at his own expense, three years before he died. The book contains a series of essays, some with an autobiographical bent, which he wrote between 1964 and 1966 and revised in 1976.

His woodcuts and linocuts dating back from the 1930s are much sought after.

== Exhibitions ==
Numerous solo and group exhibitions with Leicester Galleries in London; Kayanovita Galleries in Paris; Macquarie Galleries in Sydney; Australian Galleries in Collingwood, Melbourne; Bonython Art Galleries, Sydney and Adelaide; South Yarra Gallery, Melbourne; Darlinghurst Galleries, Sydney; David Jones Art Gallery, Sydney; Holdsworth Galleries, Sydney.

== Represented ==
His works are represented at the National Gallery of Australia, Canberra; Art Gallery of NSW, Art Gallery of Western Australia; numerous public and private collections in Australia, England, Spain and Italy.
