= Donald Friend =

Australian artist and diarist

- Donald Friend, by Michel Lawrence
- Born: Donald Stuart Leslie Friend; 6 February 1915; Cremorne, New South Wales, Australia
- Died: 16 August 1989 (aged 74)
- Known for: Painting, diarist

Donald Stuart Leslie Friend (6 February 1915 – 16 August 1989) was an Australian artist and diarist who lived much of his life overseas. He has been the subject of controversy since the posthumous publication of diaries in which he wrote about how he sexually abused boys during his time in Bali.

== Early life ==
Born in Sydney, Friend grew up in the artistic circle of his bohemian mother and showed early talent both as an artist and as a writer. He studied with Sydney Long (1931) and Antonio Dattilo Rubbo (1934–1935), and later in London (1936–1937) at the Westminster School of Art with Mark Gertler and Bernard Meninsky. During World War II he served as a gunner with the AIF, and while stationed at Albury began a friendship with Russell Drysdale, which led to their joint discovery of Hill End, a quasi-abandoned gold mining village near Bathurst, New South Wales, which in the 1950s became something of an artists' colony. He also served as an official war artist in Labuan and Balikpapan in 1945. After the war he lived for a time in the Sydney mansion-boarding house Merioola, exhibiting with the Merioola Group.

Much of Friend's life and career was spent outside Australia, in places as diverse as Nigeria (late 1930s, where he served as financial advisor to the Ogoga of Ikerre), Italy (several visits in the 1950s), Ceylon (now Sri Lanka; late 1950s – early 1960s), and Bali (from 1968 until his final return to Sydney in 1980).

== Career ==
Friend's critical reputation in the 1940s equalled those of William Dobell and Russell Drysdale, but by the time of his death it had sunk so low that his work was totally absent from the 1988 Australian Bicentennial exhibition, a show meant to include every artist of importance since white settlement.

Despite winning the Blake Prize for Religious Art in 1955, Friend made "no attempt to disguise the homoeroticism which underlay much of his work". He was well known for studies of the young male nude, including nude male children, as well as his wit. His facility as a draughtsman may have contributed to the undervaluing of his work, which art scholar Lou Klepac said "always looked too easy – decorative, flowing and natural". In the mid-1960s, Robert Hughes described him as "one of the two finest draughtsmen of the nude in Australia", and noted his humanism and lack of sentimentality, while still maintaining that he was not a major artist. Barry Pearce, however, writing in the study which accompanied Friend's posthumous retrospective at the Art Gallery of New South Wales in 1990, said that Hughes' judgement seemed harsh and called for a re-evaluation of Friend as an artist whose "contribution to the richness of Australian art is due for much greater recognition".

Friend published a number of illustrated books, almost all in limited editions.

== Diaries ==
Friend's diaries were published posthumously in four volumes from 2001 to 2006 by the National Library of Australia. He had kept a diary since the age of 14. It chronicled in half a million words a life peopled with such artists as Drysdale, Margaret Olley, Jeffrey Smart and Brett Whiteley.

Volume Four dealt in part with Friend's time in Bali in the 1960s and 1970s. Publicity claimed "[T]his volume confirms Friend's quicksilver creative brilliance and extraordinary insight. He is perhaps Australia's most important twentieth-century diarist".

Friend openly wrote about his pederasty and paedophilia, depicting himself in his journal as "a middle-aged pederast who's going to seed". His relationships were mostly with adolescent boys. But in the 1960s Friend wrote in his diary of a 10-year-old boy: "[He] spent the night with me. I hope life will continue forever to offer me delicious surprises ... and that I will always be delighted and surprised. He goes about the act of love with a charmingly self-possessed grace: gaily, affectionately, and enthusiastically. And in these matters he's very inventive and not at all sentimental for all the caresses."

Some people have said that the "arts elite of Australia continue to deny any wrongdoing on Friend's part". At least one of the victims named in the diary took legal action against the National Library of Australia for revealing his identity.

== Major collections ==
- Holmes à Court Collection
- National Gallery of Australia

== See also ==
- Visual arts of Australia
- Arthur Benjamin

== Bibliography ==
- Donald Friend, Robert Hughes, Edwards and Shaw, Sydney, 1965
- Donald Friend The Australian Landscape and its Artists, Bay Books, Sydney 1977 pp. 58–59
- Donald Friend: Australian War Artist 1945, Gavin Fry and Colleen Fry, Currey O'Neill, Melbourne, 1982
- Donald Friend 1915–1989 Retrospective, Barry Pearce, 1990
- The Diaries of Donald Friend, Volume 1, Ed. Anne Gray, 2001, ISBN 0-642-10738-6
- The Diaries of Donald Friend, Volume 2, Ed. Paul Hetherington, 2003, ISBN 978-0-642-10765-7
- The Diaries of Donald Friend, Volume 3, Ed. Paul Hetherington, 2005, ISBN 978-0-642-27602-5
- The Diaries of Donald Friend, Volume 4, Ed. Paul Hetherington, 2006, ISBN 978-0-642-27644-5
- "The Lives of Donald Friend: Towards a Biography of an Australian Artist in an International Social Setting", Ian Britain, Meanjin, Melbourne March–May 2008
- The Donald Friend Diaries, Ed. Ian Britain, 2010, ISBN 978-1-921656-70-5
- Britain, Ian (2023). The Making of Donald Friend: Life & Art. Yarra & Hunter Arts Press. ISBN 9780646877990.
