= Ethel Anderson =

Australian poet (1883–1958)

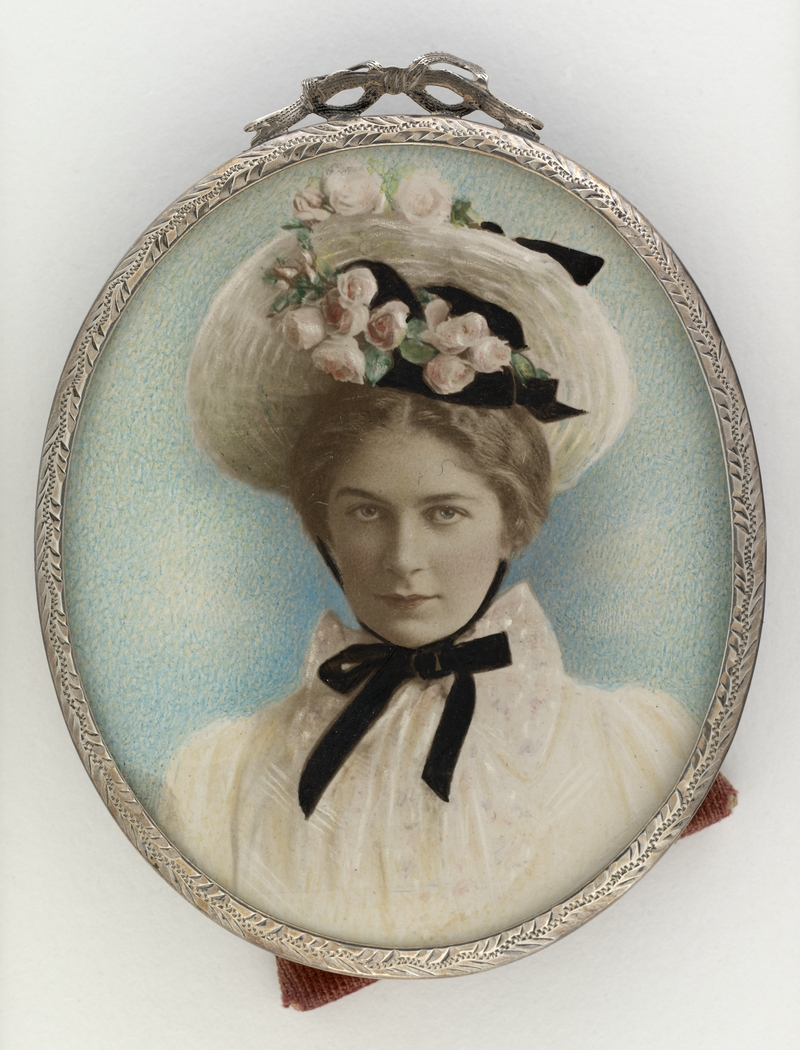
- Ethel Anderson, ca. 1905, portrait by Freeman Brothers
- Born: Ethel Campbell Louise Mason; 16 March 1883; Leamington, in Warwickshire, England
- Died: 4 August 1958 (aged 75); Sydney, Australia
- Occupations: poet; essayist; novelist; painter
- Relatives: Austin Thomas Anderson (husband); Bethia Foott (daughter)

Ethel Campbell Louise Anderson (née Mason; 16 March 1883 – 4 August 1958) was an early twentieth century Australian poet, essayist, novelist and painter. She considered herself to be mainly a poet, but is now best appreciated for her witty and ironic stories. Anderson has been described as "a high-profile author, artist, art commentator and emissary for modernism".

== Life ==
Ethel Anderson was born in Lillington, a suburb of Leamington, in Warwickshire, England, of Australian born parents Cyrus Mason and Louise Campbell on 16 March 1883. Her family soon moved back to Australia and she grew up in Sydney and at her grandfather's property, Rangamatty, near Picton, New South Wales. She was educated both at home and at Sydney Church of England Girls' Grammar School (now SCEGGS Darlinghurst).

On 8 October 1904 she married Brigadier-General Austin Thomas Anderson (1868–1949) in Ahmednagar, Bombay where she had accompanied him on his posting. In 1907 they had a daughter, Bethia.

At the beginning of World War I her husband was posted to France and Anderson moved to Cambridge, England, where she studied drawing at Downing College and exhibited some of her work.

While she was in England, from 1914 to 1924, Anderson joined the Cambridge Group and mixed with artists such as Sir William Rothenstein. She painted murals for English churches and founded the Young Worcestershire Arts and Crafts Club.

The Andersons later lived in Worcestershire, and on her husband's retirement from the army in 1924 the family moved to Australia and lived at Turramurra, New South Wales. From 1927 Brigadier Anderson became secretary to several State Governors.

In Sydney she became an important supporter of modern art and the modernist painters Grace Cossington Smith, Dorrit Black, Roland Wakelin and Roy de Maistre, by writing about their work, holding exhibitions in her home, organising exhibitions in other venues and opening exhibitions. She wrote articles on modern art and artists in various Australian publications. An exhibition of Roland Wakelin's work was held at her home. In 1930 she cleared her house of furniture to hold an exhibition of Wakelin's paintings.

In Turramurra, Ethel Anderson founded the Turramurra Wall Painters Union in 1927. She was asked by the rector of St James' Church, Sydney to help decorate the Children's Chapel and designed a mural scheme for it which was executed by her artists group in 1929.

On 16 March 1932, she opened the inaugural exhibition of the Modern Art Centre established by Dorrit Black in Margaret Street, Sydney, to teach and promote the Cubist ideas learned during Black's study trip to France. Anderson also wrote about contemporary artists' work for magazines such as Art in Australia and Home, while her poetry and stories were published in The Spectator, Punch, the Cornhill Magazine, The Atlantic Monthly, The Sydney Morning Herald and The Bulletin. Her poetry was influenced by her knowledge of French literature and Modernist work, with considerable formal and metrical experimentation. Her poem The Song of Hagar was set to music by John Antill.

The death of her husband in 1949 meant that she had to support herself, which she did through her writing, serialising her first novel At Parramatta in The Bulletin. She died on 4 August 1958 in Sydney.

== Works ==
Poetry

- Squatter's Luck and Other Poems (1942)
- Sunday At Yarralumla: A Symphony (1947)
- The Song of Hagar to the Patriarch Abraham (1957)

Non-fiction

- Adventures In Appleshire (1944)
- Timeless Garden (1945)
- Joy of Youth: The Letters of Patrick Hore-Ruthven (1950, ed.)

Fiction

- Indian Tales (1948)
- At Parramatta (1956)
- The Little Ghosts (1959)
- The Best of Ethel Anderson (1973, ed. by J. D. Pringle)

Painting

- Murals in the Children's Chapel of St James' Church, Sydney (with others)

== Bibliography ==
- Adelaide, Debra (1986) Australian Women Writers: A Bibliographic Guide, London, Pandora
- Foott, Bethia, Ethel and the Governors' General, a biography of Ethel Anderson (1883-1958) and Brigadier-General A.T. Anderson (1868-1949), Rainforest, NSW
- E. Morris Miller & Frederick T. Macartney (1956), Australian Literature, Angus and Robertson, Sydney, p. 37.
- Speer, Anne (1994) Ethel Anderson: pioneer supporter of Sydney's Post-Impressionists.
- William H. Wilde, Joy Hooton & Barry Andrews (1986) The Oxford Companion to Australian Literature, OUP, Melbourne, p. 25.
