= Cossington, Turramurra =

Cossington
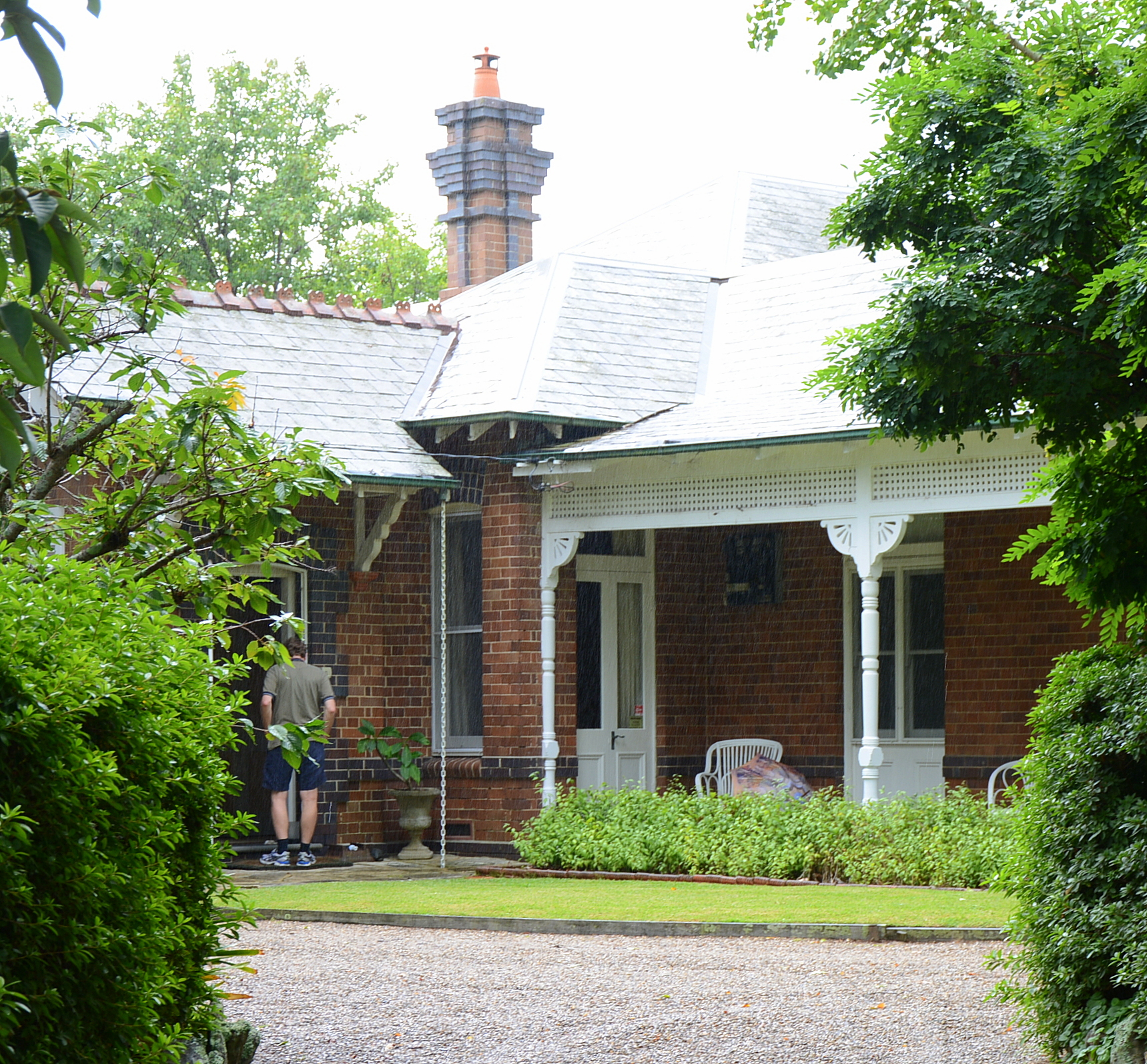
- Cossington, pictured in February 2015

- Location within Sydney Location within Australia
- 33°43′53″S 151°08′03″E
- Location: 43 Ku-Ring-Gai Avenue, Turramurra, Ku-ring-gai Council, New South Wales, Australia

History
- Built: 1899
- Built for: W. J. Baker

Site notes
- Architect(s): Nixon and Allen
- Architectural style: Federation period

New South Wales Heritage Register
- Official name: Cossington; Sylvan Fells; Sylvan Falls
- Type: State heritage (built)
- Designated: 18 August 2006
- Reference no.: 1763
- Type: House
- Category: Residential buildings (private)

Cossington is a heritage-listed residence located at 43 Ku-Ring-Gai Avenue, in the Sydney suburb of Turramurra, New South Wales, Australia. It was designed by Nixon and Allen and built in 1899. It is also known as Sylvan Fells and Sylvan Falls. The property is privately owned. It was added to the New South Wales State Heritage Register on 18 August 2006.

== History ==
=== Turramurra ===
Originally a timber-getting area settlement begun in 1822 until after 1850 when the orchardists came to occupy extensive landholdings producing a variety of citrus and other fruits including persimmons, custard apples and Chinese pears. The Turramurra railway station was opened on 1 January 1890. The suburb was then known as Eastern Road and it was nearly a year later on 14 December 1890 that Turramurra was named after the Aboriginal word meaning "high hill".

The construction of the railway brought immediate progress. In 1881 the population was only 142, by 1891 it was 788 and in 1901 1,306.

There was no electricity until 1927, water was piped from Wahroonga Reservoir and the outside loos were regularly emptied by the nightwatchman. The gaslights were lit each evening by the gaslighter. Those with very large properties kept cows for instant milk supply. Many dairies were established and the milkman delivered twice a day. By 1920 fruit fly put an end to all commercial growing of fruit on the North Shore and the land were converted into Chinese gardens.

=== Ku-rin-gai Avenue ===
The most expensive subdivision, of lots of 4.0 hectares (10 acres) or more available, is the portion around Ku-ring-gai Avenue and Boomerang Street and a number of houses listed in the Sands Directory of 1903 are found here. Shops appeared from 1912 and Chinese gardens, that disappeared after World War II.

Ku-ring-gai Avenue was owned by a few prominent people. Architect Thomas Cosh designed and built a number of houses here, possibly as a speculative builder and developer, and lived in a few of them before selling on, including:

- 2 – Ellerslie 1899 – John Shedden Adam
- 8 – Mildura 1899 – Slatyer and Cosh
- 12 – Ballydown 1897 – Charles Slatyer – Martin McIlrath (second owner of Ingleholme)
- 17 – Glensloy, Wychwood 1901 – Robertson and Marks – G. E. McFarlane (tobacco merchant); originally on a 3.6-hectare (9-acre) site
- 25 – Yacaba 1897 – Walter Vindin (solicitor)
- 31 – Creighton, Cainga, Tanvally 1899 – Thomas Cosh
- 34 – Newstead, Yprina 1903 – Lichtner, chemist and importer
- 37 – Ilanscourt 1897 – Nixon and Allen – W. J. Baker, cutler and instrument maker
- 43 – Sylvan Fels, Cossington 1899 – Nixon and Allen — Grace Cossington Smith gave drawing and painting lessons.
- 44 – Waiwera 1900 – additions by Spain and Cosh (Sir Joseph Palmer Abbott)
- Woodstock 1905 – Spain and Cosh – W. C. Penfold
- 51 – Highfield 1917
- 54 – Erahor, Cairns 1900 — Spain and Cosh (Thomas Cosh) – Dr Cosh and later J. P. Dowling
- 55 – Hampton 1900 – Alex Joske
- 56 – Strathendrick 1899 – Spain and Cosh – Mr Ward rented from Cosh
- 60 – The Terricks 1908 – Spain and Cosh, (Thomas Cosh)
- 62 – Egelabra 1908 – Spain and Cosh (Thomas Cosh)
- 77 – Talagon 1897 – Arthur Stanton Cook

==== Grace Cossington Smith ====
Grace Smith is born in 1892 at Neutral Bay to English migrant Ernest Augustus Smith and Grace (née Fisher), the second of five children. The extended name "Grace Cossington Smith" appears on her baptism entry at St Augustine in Neutral Bay. Her mother encouraged her to adopt it as part of her identity as an artist and she began actively using it in her twenties as her preferred way of being recognised, personally and professionally. In 1895 the Allowah Estate in Turramurra is subdivided (Cossington will be built on Lot 12). In 1899 the house was designed by Nixon and Allen for W. J. Baker. Named Sylvan Fells, it has an unusual timber lined meeting room which is used for Quaker meetings. According to Quaker researcher Jenny Madeline, William John Baker was a trustee for the Quaker Burial Ground established at Rookwood Necropolis in 1902 following the resumption of the Devonshire Street Cemetery for Central railway station. He had had another house built to the design of Nixon and Allen at 37 Kuringai Ave Turramurra in 1897. Cossington Smith later would say that the house at Turramurra had been designed for "'Mr Baker the Quaker' as a dwelling that could also function as a Quaker lodge, a kind of church".

- 1910 Cossington Smith attends art classes with Dattilo Rubbo in Sydney.
- 1912–14 Cossington Smith travels to Europe, attending art classes in England and Germany.
- 1913 Ernest and Grace Smith rent the house at 43 Ku-Ring-Gai Ave Turramurra from Mr Baker.
- 1914 Cossington Smith rejoins her family in the new home at Turramurra. She would live at Cossington for the next 65 years.
- 1914 Cossington Smith's father builds a small studio in the garden for her to paint in, as she recalled: "father was a dear, so was my mother; both of them were keen about my painting, and my father built me that dear little studio down at the bottom of the garden, a perfect studio".
- 1915 Cossington Smith exhibits "The Sock Knitter", an important early work of modern Australian art, based on her sister Madge seated at Cossington. It is later described by Daniel Thomas as "perhaps the first fully Post Impressionist work painted in Australia".
- 1920 Ernest Smith buys the Turramurra house, renaming it Cossington. Ernest and Grace had also given this name to their first house in Wycombe Road Neutral Bay - "in memory of the Leicestershire parish where Grace Fisher's father had been Rector".
- 1928 At the age of 36 Cossington Smith holds her first solo art exhibition at the Grosvenor Galleries. From 1932 she would hold a further 18 solo exhibitions at the Macquarie Galleries in Sydney. She would also participate in many group exhibitions and be awarded the Order of the British Empire and appointed an Officer of the Order of Australia.
- 1931 Cossington Smith's mother passes away.
- 1938 Cossington Smith's father passes away on 29 September.
- 1939 Grace and two sisters move out to lodgings in a house nearby in Womerah Street for a few months while "a large well-lit studio was added to the house, to which other minor alterations were also made by the architect Bertram Chisholm". The studio in the garden gradually deteriorates (considered to be in dangerous state of ill-repair by the late 1970s, it is demolished by Cossington Smith's niece after 1979). The original door from the garden studio is moved to the house-based studio.
- 1962 Cossington Smith's last surviving sibling Charlotte passes away, leaving Cossington to live alone at Cossington for the next 17 years.
- 1973 A major retrospective exhibition of Cossington Smith's work is curated by Daniel Thomas at the Art Gallery of New South Wales and tours nationally in all mainland states.
- 1979 Cossington Smith moves from Cossington to live in a nursing home in Roseville.
- 1984 Cossington Smith passes away on 20 December. She leaves Cossington to her brother's three children, one of which, Ann Mills, has already been living there since 1979. Ann's brother and sister sell their shares of the house to Ann, happy to keep the house within the family.
- 2005 A major retrospective of Cossington Smith's work is curated by Deborah Hart at the National Gallery of Australia and tours nationally.

==== Comments by art historians ====
"Henri Bergson's theory of vitalism, the inner, vibrant living force of all matter so well captured by Cossington Smith in the vivid contrasts of red and green and of solid and broken form in the furniture of "The Lacquer Room" [c. 1935], has been described by Mary Eagle as a unifying theme in the work of many Australian artists of the time. For Cossington Smith, though, light was to become both the symbol of her Anglican beliefs and the inspiration and method of her painting'... Commenting on the use of her characteristic square brush style, she said: "I use squares because I feel that in that way that light can be put into the colour".... In her most sophisticated paintings, her later depictions of interiors, Cossington Smith was to give the fleeting moment the awe and dignity of a lasting monument. Small moments of daily living - clothes strewn on a chair, beds made and unmade, windows and wardrobes open or shut - are imbued with spiritual everlastingness by the vibrancy of colour and light, a juncture of the ordinary and the sublime... "

"Juxtaposed pure colours, applied with a distinctive broad brushstroke, depict intimate views of her home, light-filled and spiritual. She described her work as "expressing form in colour, colour vibrant with light - but containing this other, silent quality which is unconscious, and belongs to all things created".

"'Interior in Yellow' was begun [probably in 1962]... Like the ecstatic, abstract draperies that fill Old Master paintings, the rumpled bed cover and unspecific cloths are devices that connect the spectator to a surge of visual and emotional energy... "The fullness and density of light and air in a particular contained space are certainly here, but a general statement of delight in the morning's silent annunciation of each new day, and its purification of inner space is also apparent. There are dreams and memory of a mother, father, sisters, brother and friends. Bedroom stillness, pain and death are present, but so too is sleep - as a source of renewal and revivification. "Interior in Yellow" is a rare philosophical meditation upon the unerotic bedroom, chaste but filled with psychic shimmer. And by contrast there is also the unquiet crackle of tense, bounce-back energy surging between inwardness and the outside world. The body was cracking up but Grace was still high-spirited."

"I was curator of Australian art at the Art Gallery of New South Wales in the 1960s and 70s, and prepared the touring exhibition that in 1973 first brought Grace Cossington Smith's work to an Australia-wide audience. I am now retired, as Emeritus Director of the Art Gallery of South Australia. Last year when the National Gallery of Australia prepared another major touring exhibition of Cossington Smith's work I contributed essays to the exhibition book, and I have since further reconsidered her work.

"I would submit a stronger case, for national as well as State heritage significance. "I now believe that Grace Cossington Smith is more than "a leading twentieth-century Australian artist". She is probably the best Australian woman artist of any century, and the best Australian artist of any kind working in the 1920s and 30s. Her later work, more profound and inward than the earlier work, cannot be compared with the very different work of great artists like Sidney Nolan or Fred Williams, but is equal to theirs in excellence. All her paintings have extraordinary vitality; they live, and they express joy in living in an Australian bushland suburb and a great Australian city.

"Her later work often takes its subject matter from the house and garden at Cossington, where her first studio, from 1914, was a hut built for her in the garden; then in 1939 a studio was added to the house itself. The late paintings evoke the lives of several women, artist friends, a sister who was a nurse, and their World War II activities, including church-going. The fact that the house, before the artist's father bought it, had been built as a Quaker meeting house, helped reinforce the sacramental delight in simple living that fills the artist's paintings."

"I am not sure there is another artist in the entire history of Australian art for whom there can be the same two-fold association of firstly, a house in which the artist lived for entirety of a career - more than six decades - and secondly, where the interior structure itself - ie the rooms inside - formed the basis of subject matter pursued with magnificent and profoundly spiritual dedication over that time."

"[Listing Cossington on the SHR] is a wonderful gesture to a very important Australian artist whose work relates so closely to her own home and its surrounds."

== Description ==
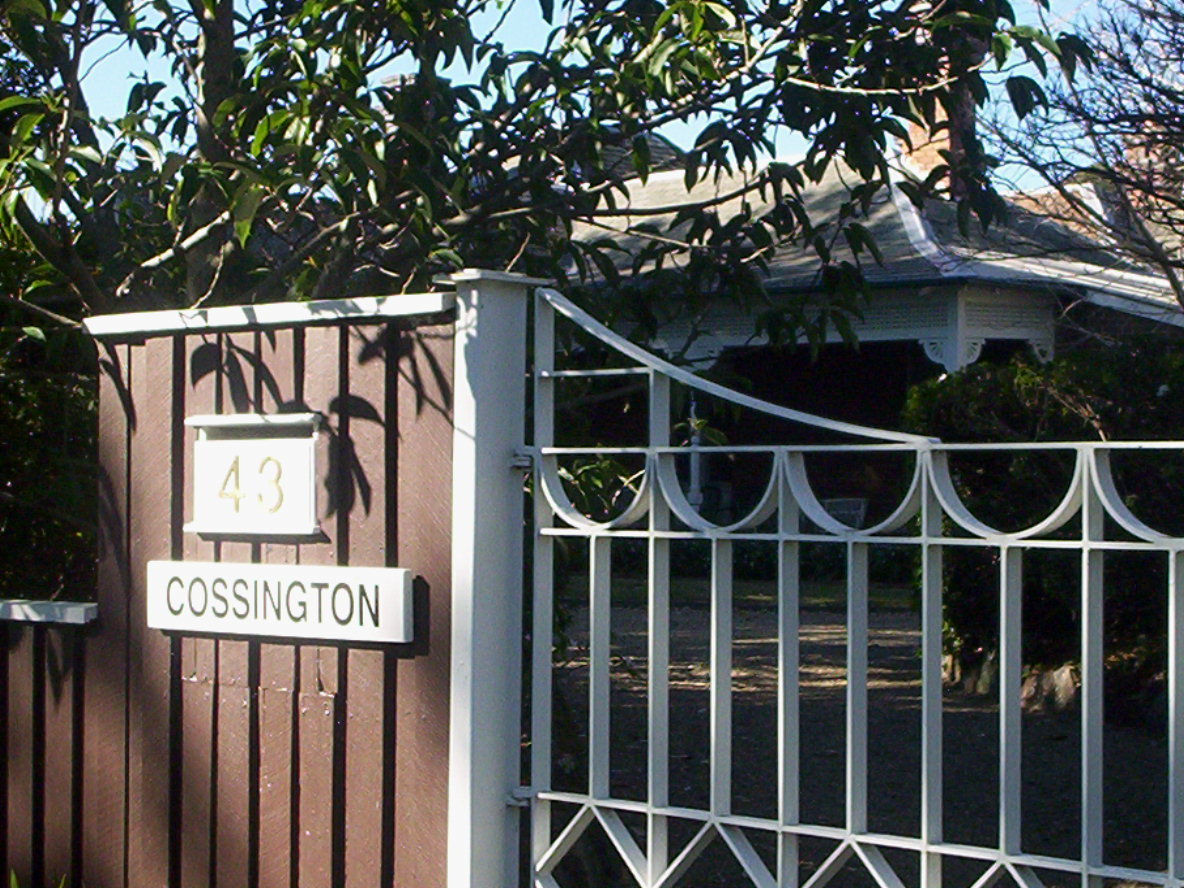
Cossington entrance, pictured in 2005.

A Federation period home with fine timber detailing and an unusual timber lined meeting room. A large single storey Federation style house constructed of red open kiln bricks with blue brick dressings along the line of the window ledges and above the windows. Mitre slate roof with lead ridging. There are four decorative chimneys of red and blue bricks. Strong veranda details include turned posts, delicately incised timber brackets and lattice valance.

The interior features an impressive kauri board lined central meeting room with a fine cedar screen with decorative leadlight panels and a rough hewn stone fire surround.

The house stands in a mature garden of dense-leafed evergreens, pines, azaleas and camellias, with a wide gravel brick-edged drive in good condition. The front fence repeats the style and structure of many fences in Ku-Ring-Gai Avenue, with overlapping palings and squared timber coping. There are heavy wrought iron gates in rectangular and diamond pattern.

The door from the new kitchen (previous spare bedroom) to the back veranda is original and unusual in that the joinery makes the shape of a cross (this may be a remnant of significance to the original Quaker occupants). The door into Cossington Smith's former studio (in the south eastern corner of the house) is significant as it had been the door to her studio in the garden and was moved to its new position when she moved the studio into the house.

=== Moveable heritage ===
The major dark wood furniture in the dining room is largely the same as when Cossington Smith lived there - a large bookcase with many art books that had been owned by Cossington Smith, the dining table and chairs and the large sideboard, as well as the mantle clock over the original fireplace. This room also contains its original french doors leading from the living room to the back veranda, making it perhaps the most intact room in the house. In the living room, the original fireplace is graced with its original mantle clock and two period drawings of GCS's forebears titled "Great grandfather Smith" and "Great grandmother".

Modifications since 1979 are minor and largely reversible if desired.

=== Modifications and dates ===
- 1899 – House built, used for Quaker meetings.
- 1913 – House first rented by Ernest and Grace Smith, who renamed it "Cossington" when Ernest bought it in 1920. Between 1913 and his death in 1938 Ernest added a verandah and entrance vestibule to the front facade of the house, moving the front door from the south side of the house to the west side; added a tennis court to the back yard; and built a studio for Cossington Smith to work in, in the north eastern corner of the back garden.
- 1938 to 1979 – Cossington Smith moves her studio into the house, extending the south side of the house in 1939 to incorporate it as a new room, and at the same time extending the bedroom on the other side of the hall ("Madge's bedroom"). These minor modifications are designed by the architect Bertram Chisholm. Cossington Smith and her sisters sell the second block of land behind the house which was depicted in "Bonfire in the Bush" 1937. A large liquidambar tree is now situated in about the same place as where the three sisters stood in the painting.
- 1979 to 2006 – Cossington Smith moves to a nursing home and her niece Ann Mills moves into the house with her family. The Mills demolish a garage on the north front facade, add a car port on the south front facade and put in a circular drive. They also demolish Cossington Smith's derelict studio in the back garden, not having been used for 40 years. The kitchen is moved from the north western corner of the house to the north eastern corner of the house, replacing what had been a spare bedroom known as the Blue Room (or sewing room) plus laundry, linen cupboard and hall. On the advice of insurers the Mills replace the French doors in the bedrooms with windows. A new doorway is cut into the main bedroom, which had been Cossington Smith's room, to give access to the bathroom. To make room for a double bed in this room, the fireplace is also removed and a built-in wardrobe added. The room behind the car port, which had been Cossington Smith's studio, is extended and glass sliding door added. The tennis court is enlarged and its grass surfacing replaced with artificial surface. The original back veranda is raised 18 inches (40 cm) to meet Council regulations. In 1991 a large gumtree in the back garden falls over in a huge storm, without major damage to property. In recent years, the wooden lining of the Quakers' Room (the living room and dining room) has been extensively cleaned (after appearing nearly black after a century collecting soot from the fireplaces); also the doors and leadlighting have been carefully restored. The slate roof has been restored. The back veranda has been extended.

== Heritage listing ==
As at 27 September 2006, as the adult home of Grace Cossington Smith and the subject of many of her finest paintings, Cossington is of State heritage significance for its association with this outstanding twentieth century Australian artist. Cossington is also of State significance for its association with women's history in NSW in so far as Cossington Smith's art works represent an especially feminine perspective on Australian culture – as viewed from the interior of an upper middle-class suburban house. Cossington is also of local heritage significance for its unusual timber-lined meeting room originally used for Quaker meetings, for its associations with Cossington Smith's eminent lawyer father Ernest Smith, for its architectural qualities as a Federation bungalow designed by Nixon & Allen, and for its garden contributing to the streetscape.

"I am not sure there is another artist in the entire history of Australian art for whom there can be the same two-fold association of firstly, a house in which the artist lived for entirety of a career – more than six decades – and secondly, where the interior structure itself – ie the rooms inside – formed the basis of subject matter pursued with magnificent and profoundly spiritual dedication over that time."

Cossington was listed on the New South Wales State Heritage Register on 18 August 2006 having satisfied the following criteria.

The place is important in demonstrating the course, or pattern, of cultural or natural history in New South Wales.

Cossington is likely to be of state heritage significance for its association with women's history in NSW. Cossington Smith's art works represent a widespread but especially feminine perspective on Australian culture – as viewed from the interior of an upper middle-class suburban house. Cossington is also likely to be considered of at least local heritage significance for its historical relationship with the Quakers in NSW.

The place has a strong or special association with a person, or group of persons, of importance of cultural or natural history of New South Wales's history.

As the adult home of Grace Cossington Smith and the subject of many of her finest paintings, Cossington is of State heritage significance for its association with this leading twentieth century Australian artist. Cossington is also of local heritage significance for its previous use as a Quaker meeting house, still apparent in the wooden lined ceilings in the room now used as living room and dining room. Cossington is also of local heritage significance for its association with Cossington Smith's father Ernest Augustus Smith, a lawyer who was the NSW Solicitor General 1891–1894 (before buying the house). He also led his professional association of notaries the for a time. "The profession, and the community service, might be considered characteristic of those who lived in the highland suburbs on the North Shore Line".

The place is important in demonstrating aesthetic characteristics and/or a high degree of creative or technical achievement in New South Wales.

Cossington is of local heritage significance for its architectural qualities as a Federation bungalow designed by Dixon & Adam, and for its garden and contribution to the streetscape. The room that was the Quaker meeting room is also of aesthetic significance for its impressive kauri-board ceilings with fine cedar screen and decorative leadlight panels, as well as its rough hewn stone fireplaces.

The place has potential to yield information that will contribute to an understanding of the cultural or natural history of New South Wales.

As the long-time home of one of Australia's leading artists and the subject of many of her finest paintings, Cossington is of State significance with respect to its research potential for art historians.

== See also ==
- Australian residential architectural styles
