= Bethia Foott =

Australian non-fiction writer (1907–1995)

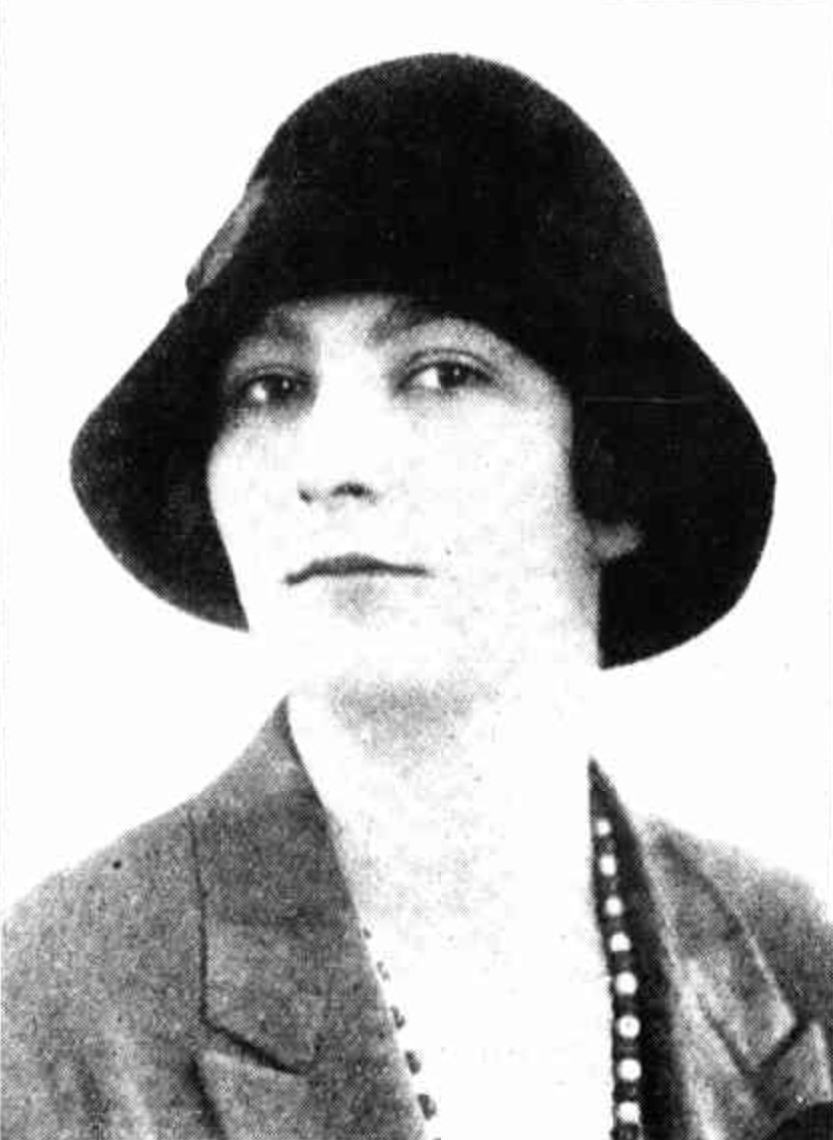
- Foott in 1929
- Born: Grace Gwendoline Bethia Anderson; 1907; India
- Died: 1995 (aged 87–88); Cirencester, Gloucestershire, England
- Relatives: Ethel Anderson (mother)
- Writing career
- Period: 1927–1992

Bethia Foott (1907–1995) was an Australian non-fiction writer. She is best known for Dismissal of a Premier, a record of the 1932 dismissal of Jack Lang by the New South Wales Governor, Sir Philip Game.

== Life ==
Grace Gwendoline Bethia Anderson was born in 1907 in India to poet Ethel (née Mason) and (later Brigadier-General) Austin Thomas Anderson. In 1914, on the outbreak of World War I, she and her mother moved to England, while her father served in France.

The family moved to Australia in 1924 and settled at Turramurra. Her father became private secretary to three governors of New South Wales, Sir Dudley de Chair and Sir Philip Game and to Sir Alexander Hore-Ruthven. This connection enabled her to access Game's papers and write Dismissal of a Premier in 1968.

In addition to her writing, Foott was also an artist, exhibiting at the Blaxland Galleries. Her work was included in the 1934 exhibition of more than 120 Australian women artists in Sydney. A portrait of Foott by Roland Wakelin was entered in the 1931 Archibald Prize and she herself entered the 1937 Wynne Prize.

During World War II, Foott served with the Women's National Emergency League (WNEL) in Brisbane. Together with another army wife, Molly Mann, she wrote We Drove the Americans based on their experiences. The book received mixed reviews.

Her final book, Ethel and the Governors-General, a biography of her mother, a noted poet and artist, was published in 1992.

== Personal ==
Foott married Thomas Harry Brudenall (Allan) Foott on 27 May 1931 at St James' Church, Sydney, followed by a reception at Government House for 350 people. Following his death in 1952, she married Albert Harrison Ogden.

Foott died in Cirencester, England in 1995.

== Works ==
- Mann, Molly; Foott, Bethia (1944). We drove the Americans. Angus and Robertson.
- Foott, Bethia (1958). Leonora : an indomitable woman. Currawong Publishing.
- Foott, Bethia (1968). Dismissal of a Premier : the Phillip Game papers. Morgan Publications.
- Foott, Bethia (1992). Ethel and the governors' general : a biography of Ethel Anderson (1883–1958) and Brigadier-General A.T. Anderson (1868–1949). Rainforest Publishing. ISBN 978-0-947134-06-8.
