= Children's Chapel, St James' Church, Sydney =

Church building in New South Wales, Australia

Coordinates: 33°52′10″S 151°12′40″E

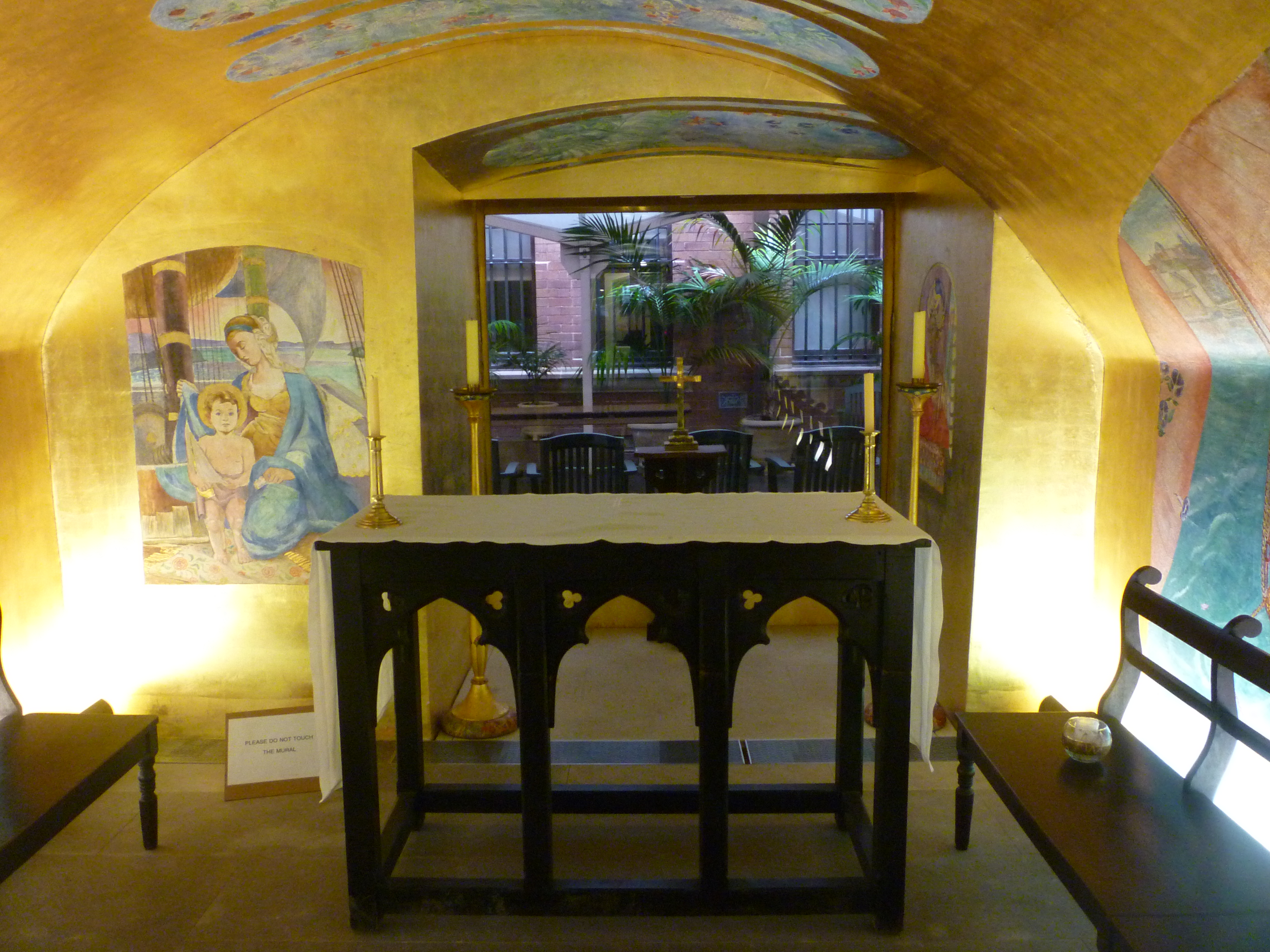
Altar in the Children's Chapel of St James' Church, Sydney

The Chapel of Saint Mary and the Angels (usually known as the Children's Chapel) is a chapel in one of the bays of the crypt of St James' Church, Sydney, created as a place for younger children to receive an adapted form of the Eucharist on Sundays. In the 21st century, the chapel is used for the children's Eucharist on the first Sunday of the month. The walls and ceiling of the chapel are painted with scenes inspired by the Christmas carol "As I Sat Under A Sycamore Tree" with the setting transferred to Sydney Harbour.

As I Sat Under a Sycamore Tree

As I sat under a sycamore tree,
A sycamore tree, a sycamore tree,
I looked me out upon the sea,
On Christ's Sunday morn.

I saw three ships a sailing there,
A sailing there, a sailing there;
Jesu, Mary and Joseph they bare,
On Christ's Sunday at morn.

Jesu did whistle and Mary did sing,
Mary did sing, Mary did sing,
And all the bells on earth did ring,
For joy, our Lord was born.

O they sail'd in to Bethlehem,
To Bethlehem to Bethlehem;
St Michael was the steersman
Saint John sate in the horn.

And all the bells on earth did ring,
On earth did ring, on earth did ring;
Welcome be Thou, Heaven's King,
On Christ's Sunday at morn.

The murals were designed by Ethel Anderson and painted as a collaborative project by the Turramurra Wall Painters Union—a group of modernist painters founded by Anderson in 1927—among whom were Ethel Anderson, Bethia Anderson, sisters Gwen and Jean Ramsey, Roy de Maistre and Roland Wakelin. Friends of the artists also helped on small parts of the painting. Some parts of the mural are attributable to individual artists and some are signed. The rector of St James' at the time, Philip Micklem, was a friend of Anderson and had invited the Turramurra Wall Painters Union to decorate the chapel. The work was carried out between October and December 1929 and completed in time for Christmas; the first service being held on 22 December 1929.

== Concept ==
The concept behind the murals, as explained by Ethel Anderson, was "to bring the story of Bethlehem into surroundings perfectly familiar to the mind of the Australian child, and to give these familiar surroundings a beauty strange enough to awaken wonder in a child's mind, so that through this wonder might come a suggestion that beyond the world they know there is another world; to show the spiritual by means of the material." A painted study by Anderson for the mural is held in the State Library of New South Wales.

Artistically, the aim was to give the impression of an illuminated manuscript citing specifically the Book of Kells and the Très Riches Heures du Duc de Berry as influences. Anderson wrote: "That is why we have used so much gold, and why we are allowing a slight archaic touch to show in the drawing and in our choice and arrangement of colour." The artists referred to photographs to help with their depictions of children, yachts and the Sydney Harbour Bridge. One of these sources was the work of well-known photographer Harold Cazneaux.

The use of over three thousand leaves of gold leaf in the artistic scheme produced a shimmering effect that was reported at the time. The Home magazine of February 1930 commented that "at every change of light, bright facets from it dart from one wall to the other touching to brightness haloes, wings, spires, spars or the decks and riggings of ships, all made of gold. When the chapel is full of children, their clothes are mirrored in it."

== Imagery ==
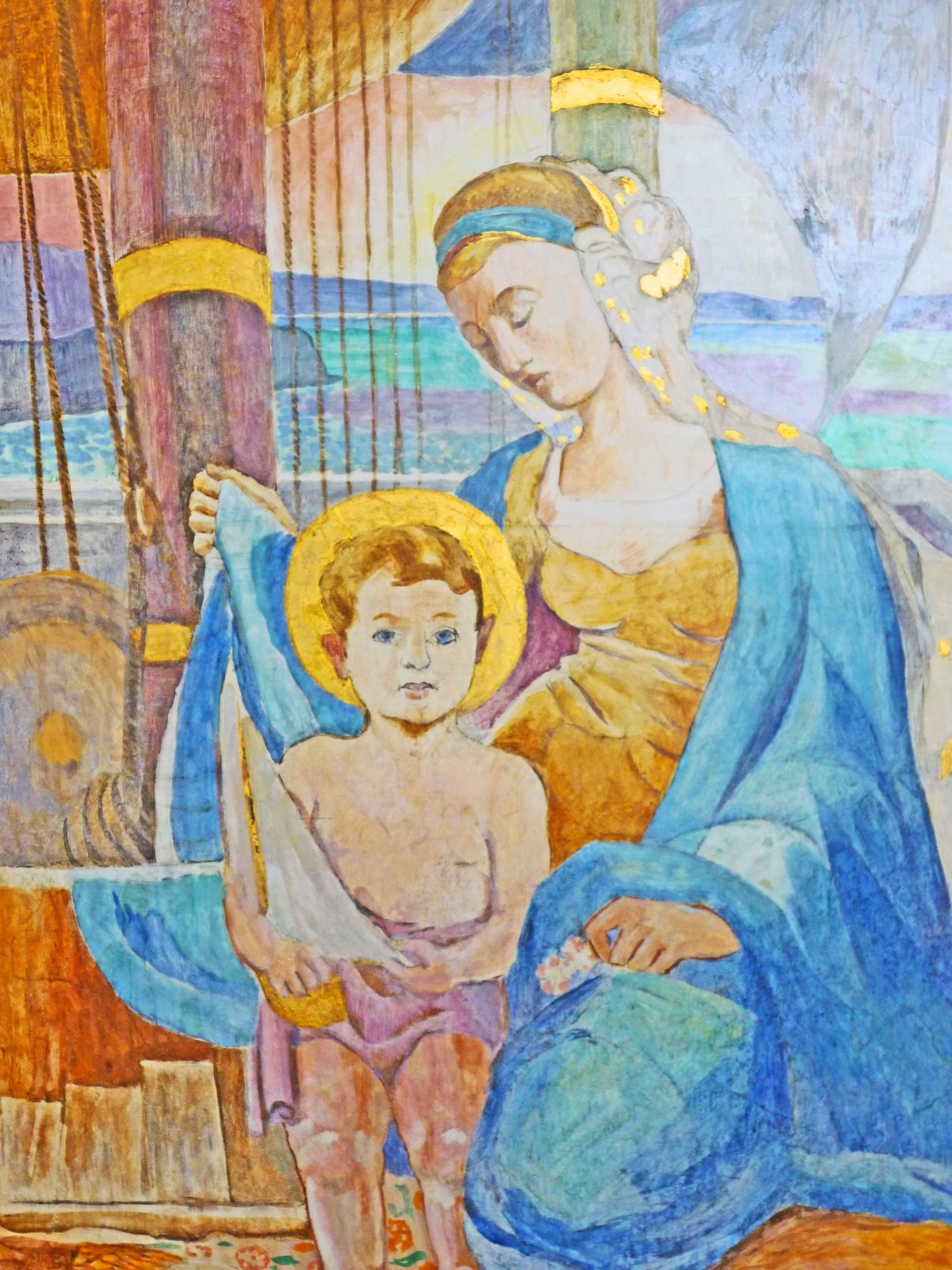
Detail, southern wall - Mary with the infant Jesus

The images in the murals depict the wassailing song "As I Sat Under A Sycamore Tree", itself a variant of the carol "I Saw Three Ships", in which the Holy Family sail into Bethlehem with Saint Michael and Saint John as their boatmen. At that time, the Sydney Harbour Bridge was being built and it can be seen under construction from both sides of the chapel. From the perspective of the entrance to the chapel, depictions of the southern side of Sydney Harbour with the south pylon of the Harbour Bridge under construction can be seen on the right-hand side along with Circular Quay, the spire of St James', Garden Island, Woolloomooloo Bay and in the distance, the spire of St John's Darlinghurst. St Michael in a boat with pink sails dominates the foreground of one section, in the background of which HMAS Sydney and HMAS Melbourne can be seen berthed at Garden Island.

On the left side is the north shore of Sydney with Admiralty House, Taronga Park and McMahons Point. On either side of the door are Saint John the Baptist and the Angel of Mercy, with a cockatoo. To the left of the altar is the Child Jesus with Mary his mother, sitting on deck, with Sydney Heads in the background beyond the rigging. Saint Joseph is featured in the window recess to the right.

The ceiling features arches of blue and gold with panels of fuchsias and flowering cedar for the sycamore of the text. On the North wall is an image of a man in clerical vestments, a style that was depreciated in the Diocese of Sydney in the 1930s for being "popish", providing an important historical record of church practice of the time of the painting.

== Conservation ==
In 1952, Anderson carried out some remedial work on the murals but requested that no further work be done during her lifetime. She died in 1958. By the 1980s the murals had deteriorated so much that the chapel had to be closed. Large sections of the paint were being lost as a result of crystalline salts on the wall surface forcing off the painted plaster and gold leaf. With a grant from the Heritage Council of New South Wales, the chapel was restored in 1992 with work done by skilled conservators under the aegis of International Conservation Services. The conservators employed a technique used in Europe for treating frescoes. The painted plaster was removed from the curved walls and the plaster removed leaving only the paint surface. Then an inert synthetic fabric was attached to the back of the paint layer to support it. A fibreglass shell was moulded to line the chapel walls and the paint layer reattached to the new surface. Those parts of the mural which were severely damaged were inpainted using contemporary photographs as a guide to reconstruction. The work matches the original but can still be distinguished from it.

== Gallery ==
Details of mural scenes
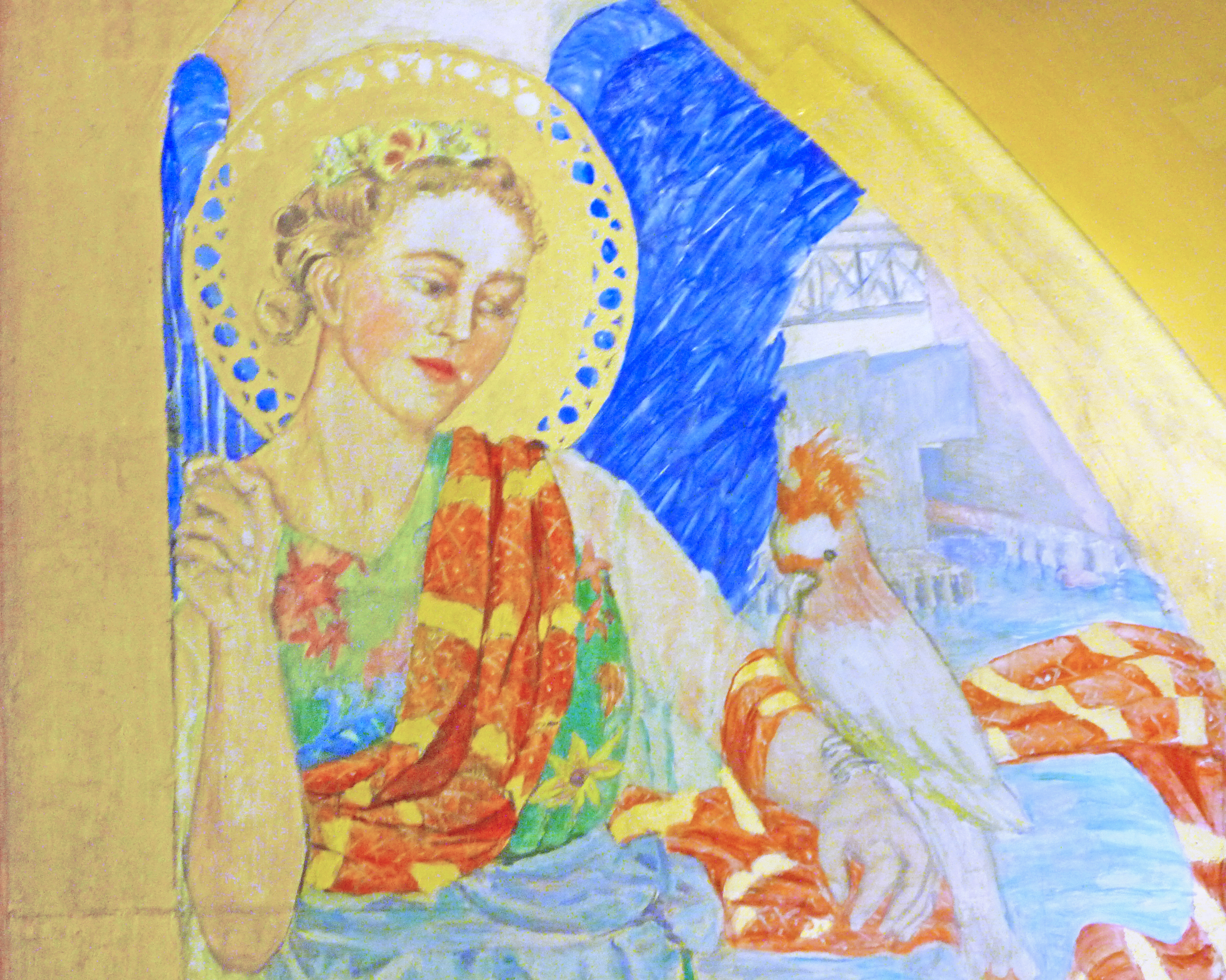
Angel of Mercy with cockatoo on the northern wall

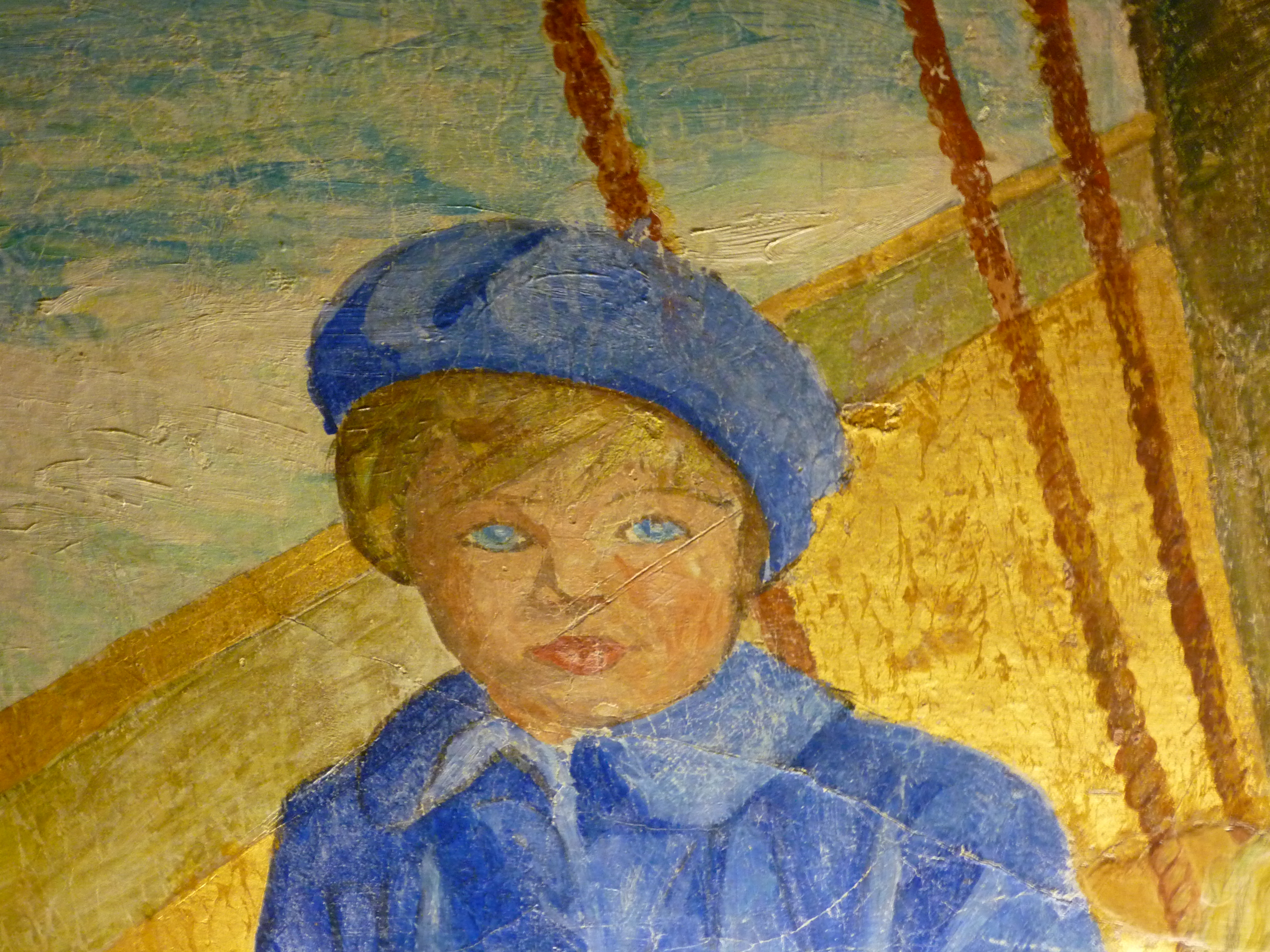
Child in blue on eastern wall

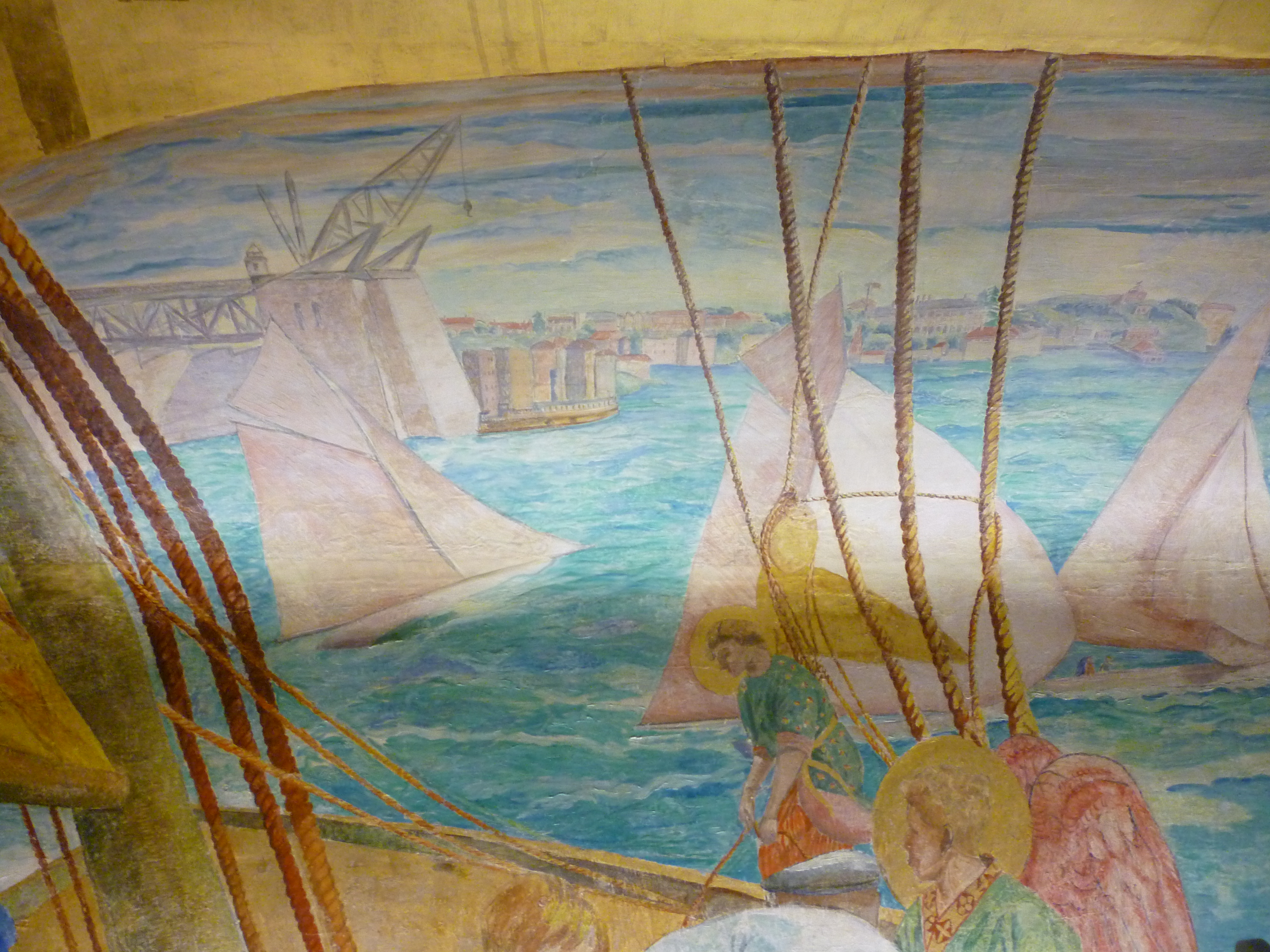
Southern end of Harbour Bridge under construction

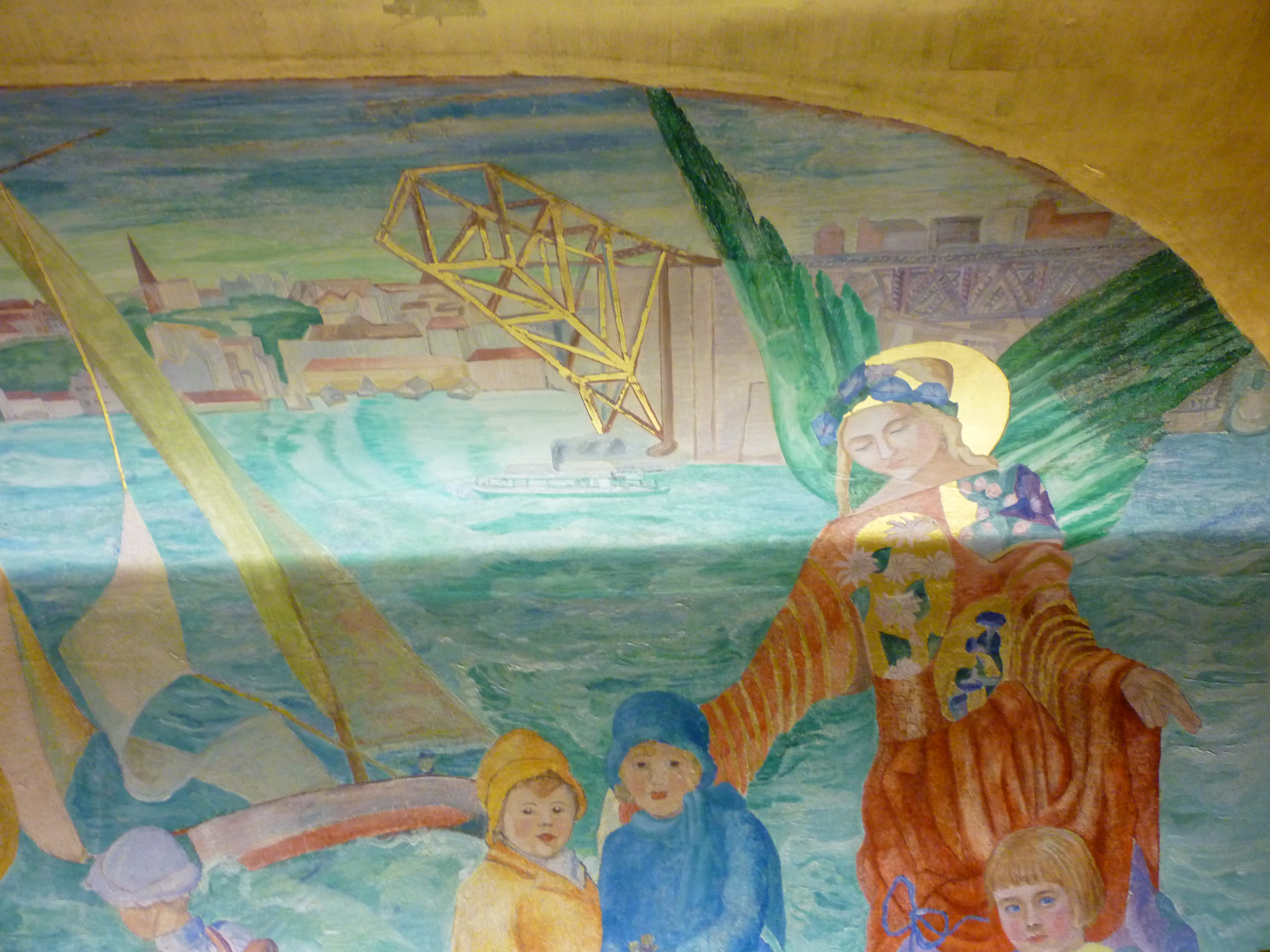
Northern end of Harbour Bridge under construction
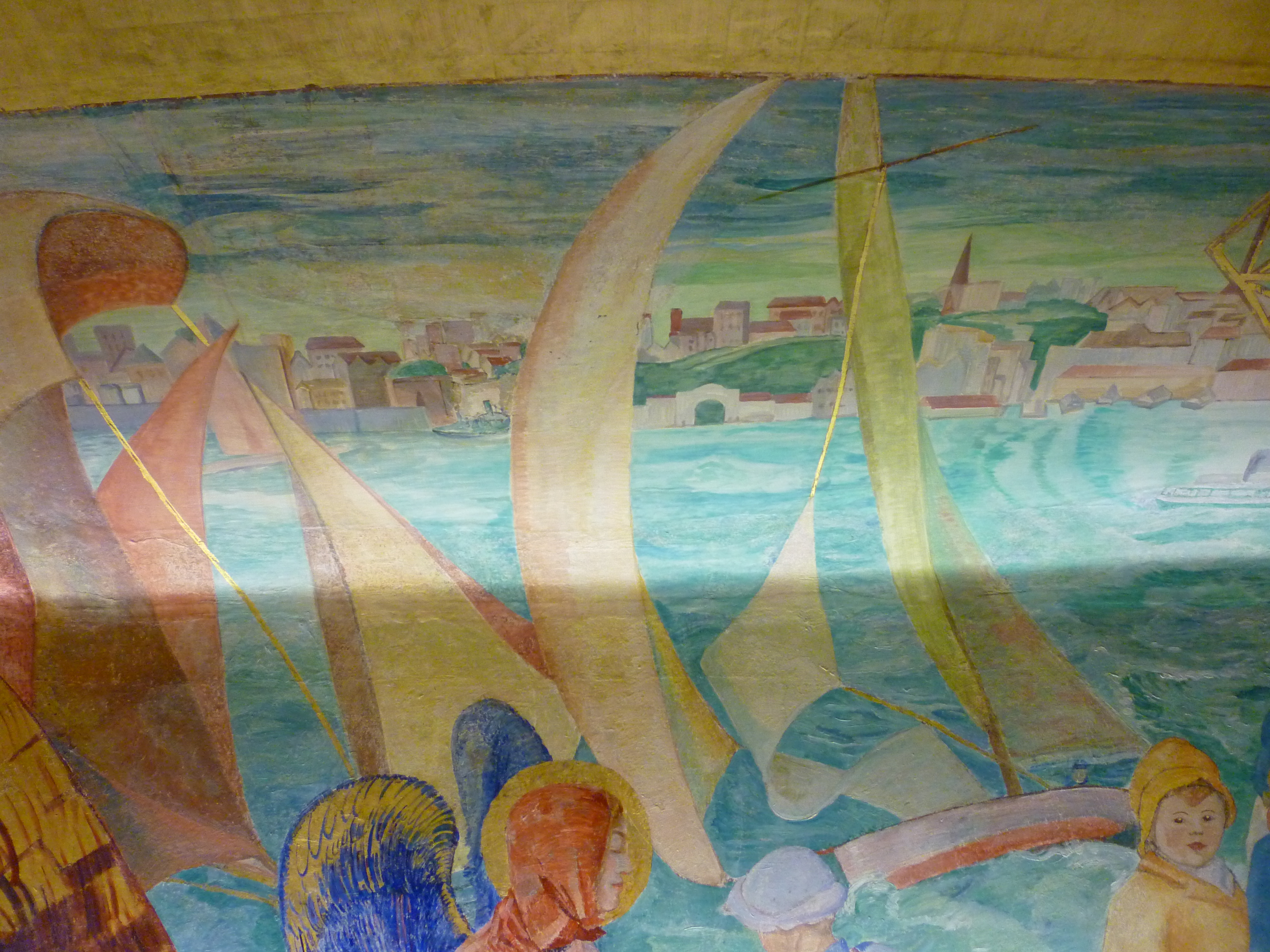
Children and angels sailing on the harbour

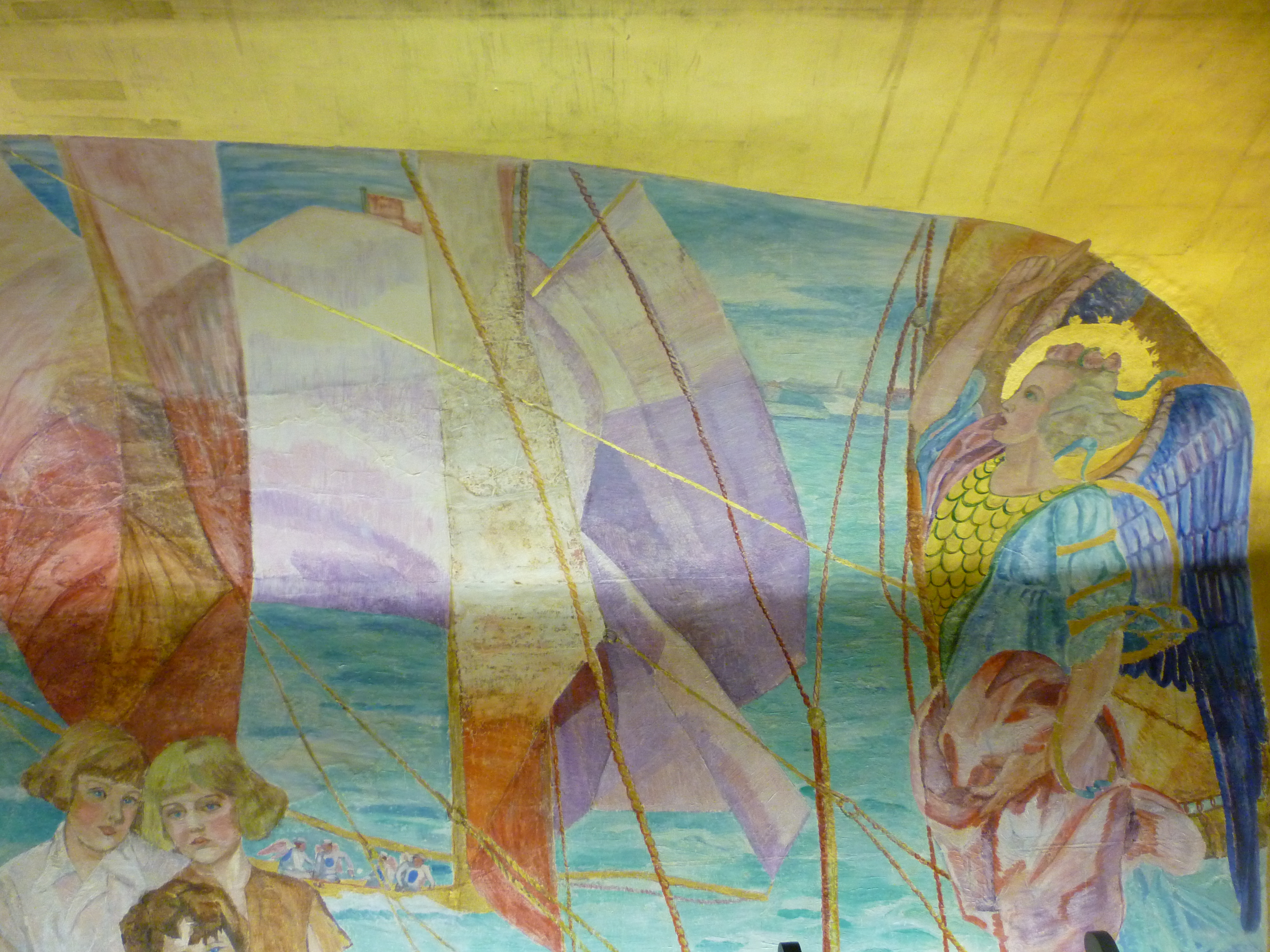
Angel and girls in sailing boat

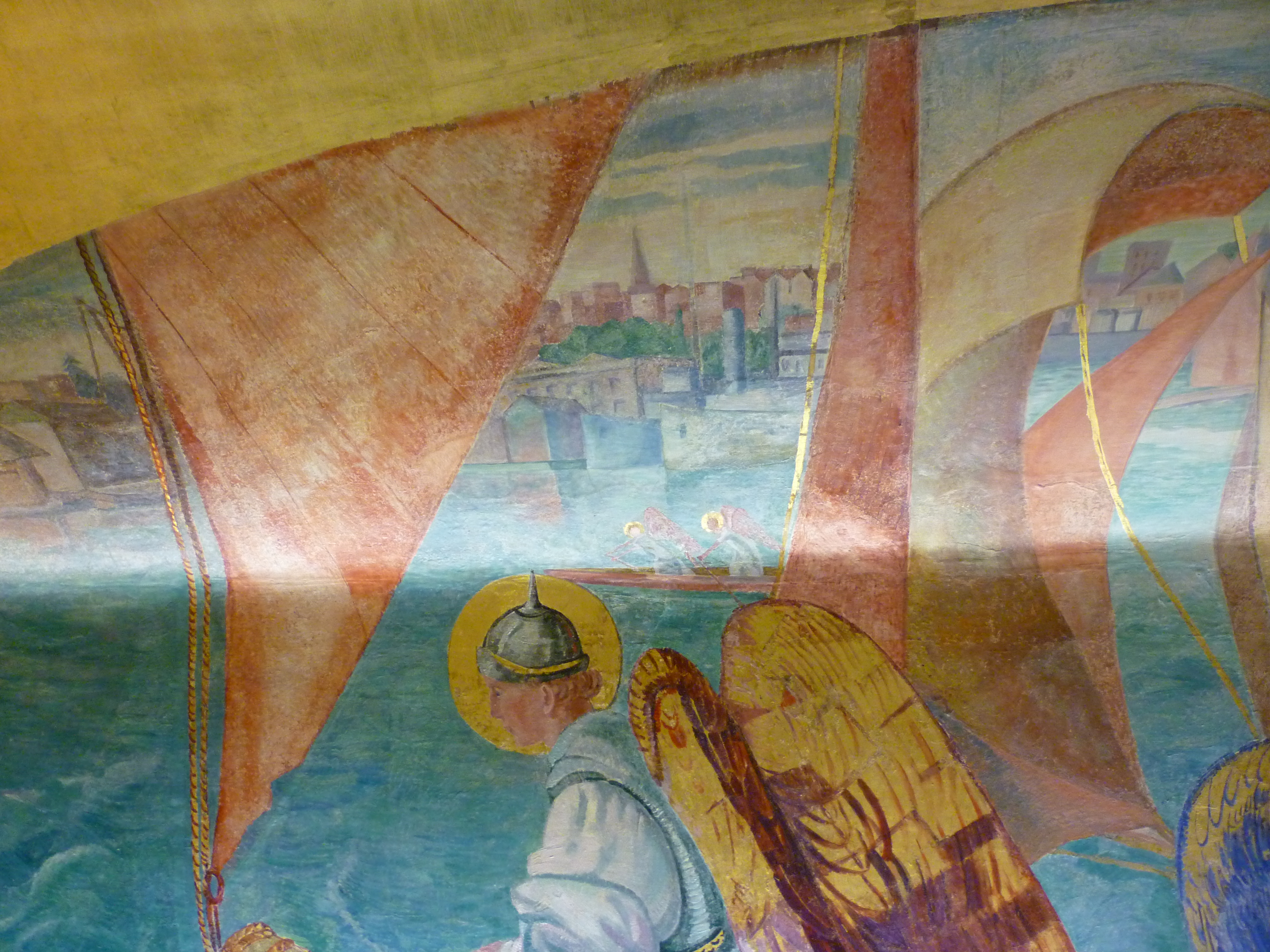
St Michael and Garden Island on western wall

== Sources ==
- Diakowska-Czarnota, Anna; Werstak, Arek (1994). "Conservation and restoration of the mural paintings from the Children's Chapel in the Church of St James, King Street, Sydney: looking for the method of transfer" (PDF). Australian Institute for the Conservation of Cultural Materials Bulletin. 19 (3–4): 3–24. Archived from the original (PDF) on 22 April 2012.
