= A. T. Anderson =

Australian military officer (1868–1949)

Brigadier-General A. T. Anderson CMG
- Anderson in 1918
- Born: 28 August 1868; Mauritius
- Died: 22 February 1949 (aged 80); Turramurra, New South Wales, Australia
- Military career
- Rank: Brigadier-General
- Conflicts: World War I
- Awards: Légion d'honneur
- Other work: Private Secretary to the Governors of New South Wales

Brigadier-General Austin Thomas Anderson CMG (1868–1949) was an Australian brigadier-general who was in the Royal Artillery.

Anderson was the son of William Mather Anderson (Chief Inspector of the Oriental Bank in London and Acting Governor of Mauritius at one time) and Mary Anne Neilley (born and married in Australia and died in England). He was born on 28 August 1868 in Mauritius.

On 8 October 1908, Anderson married Ethel Campbell Louise Mason in Ahmednagar, India. During World War I, he served in the 7th (Meerut) Division and commanded the 48th (South Midland) Division artillery from 1920 through 1924. He retired from the military in 1924 and settled in Sydney.

Anderson is said to have received the French Légion d'honneur medal in the park at Cambrai in 1916. However, the Musée de la Légion d'honneur says that Augustin Thomas Anderson, a colonel in the British Army, received the medal on 12 December 1918.

From 1927 through 1939 he was the private secretary to Sir Dudley de Chair, the Governor of New South Wales, Australia, Sir Philip Game, and Sir Alexander Hore-Ruthven. In 1939 he became the Comptroller to the Governor General.

Anderson died on 22 February 1949 in Turramurra, New South Wales, Australia. He was survived by his wife and their only daughter, Bethia Foott.
