= The Bridge in Curve =

1930 painting by Grace Cossington Smith

- Artist: Grace Cossington Smith
- Year: 1930
- Type: tempera on cardboard
- Dimensions: 83.6 cm × 111.8 cm (32.9 in × 44.0 in)
- Location: National Gallery of Victoria, Melbourne

The Bridge in Curve is a painting completed in 1930 by Australian artist Grace Cossington Smith, depicting the Sydney Harbour Bridge during its construction. The work is now considered one of Australia's best modernist paintings, but was rejected from exhibition in 1930.

Since 1967 the painting has been part of the collection of the National Gallery of Victoria in Melbourne.

== Background ==
According to the National Gallery of Australia, Smith painted The Bridge in Curve, which is based on drawings made at Milsons Point on the North Shore, during an important phase of her career as an artist, when the importance of colour and the application of paint in small strokes gave her paintings a "brilliant vitality". Smith had become interested in colour theory and used this painting as an opportunity to demonstrate it with the blue and white of the sky contrasting with the more earthy colours of the buildings and vegetation.

=== Construction of the bridge ===
Sydney Harbour Bridge was built to better connect the North Shore suburbs with Sydney and reduce water traffic. A Royal Commission reported on the potential for a link in 1909, and ground was finally broken on the 28 July 1923. September 1926 saw the completion of the piers that would support the spans approaching the arch. Construction of the arch started on each shore in 1928, and they met for the first time on 19 August 1930. The bridge opened to the public in 1932.

== Reception ==
Upon completion the painting was rejected from the Society of Artists exhibition of 1930. The painting was only purchased for the National Gallery of Victoria in 1967, which has been criticised as indicative of the neglect of Cossington Smith's work.

The Bridge in Curve has since been identified as "one of Australia's most significant modernist paintings". It was described as a masterpiece of bridge painting by Ursula Prinster, curator of a 1982 Art Gallery of New South Wales exhibition on paintings of the Harbour bridge. Others have provided fuller descriptions of the painting'

[It] integrates earth-bound realities with the sweeping, soaring movement of the forming bridge structure, curving across the land and into the sky, the two cranes a bit like Brancusi birds, perched on the edge of possibility.

— Deborah Hart, Senior Curator of Australian painting at The National Gallery of Australia

The contrast between the bridge and its surroundings is highlighted by art historians. The differentiation between the distant, obscure shore, and the blocks of colour in the foreground, with the detailed and delicate depiction of the bridge's struts and girders has been noted, the bridge seeming to rise above the chaos below.

== See also ==
- Visual arts of Australia
- Culture of Australia
