= Norah Simpson =

Australian artist (1895–1974)

- Born: 5 July 1895; Sydney, Australia
- Died: 19 February 1974 (aged 78); Instow, England
- Known for: Painting
- Movement: Modernism
- Spouse: William Henry Cockren

Norah Simpson (5 July 1895 – 19 February 1974) was an Australian modernist painter. She grew up in Sydney and is described as "giving impetus to modernism" in Australia: when returning from France in 1913, she brought back a series of reproductions of then-current works which were influential to her fellow art students. Sydney-based modernists inspired by those works and Simpson's descriptions of techniques include Grace Cossington Smith, Roy de Maistre and Roland Wakelin.

== Biography ==
Norah Simpson was born on 5 July 1895 and grew up in Sydney. In 1911 Simpson was a student of Antonio Dattilo Rubbo, an Italian-born artist who taught in Australia from 1897, fellow students were Tempe Manning and Grace Cossington Smith. Late in 1911 Simpson travelled to London, and lived in Chelsea. Next year she enrolled in the Westminster School of Art and was taught by Walter Sickert, then she travelled to France to see the work of Cézanne, van Gogh, Matisse and Picasso. In 1913 she brought back to Australia a suitcase full of art books and reproductions of their works, thereby "giving impetus to modernism" in Australia. The works contributed to "the debate and practice of new techniques and new subjects" by Simpson, Smith and Manning. Other Sydney artists influenced by Simpson include Roy de Maistre and Roland Wakelin. By 1915 Simpson had returned to London, then moved to Glasgow in 1919 and on to France in 1920. In 1920 she married Edward Richardson Brown and they had a son, Donald, and by 1921 Simpson was no longer painting. In 1950 she married William Henry Cockren, and she died in 1974 at Crossways, Instow, North Devon.
