= Grace Cossington Smith =

Australian artist (1892–1984)

Grace Cossington Smith AO OBE
- Grace Cossington Smith, self-portrait, 1948, oil on cardboard, 39.5 x 30.7 cm, National Portrait Gallery.
- Born: 20 April 1892; Neutral Bay, New South Wales, Australia
- Died: 20 December 1984 (aged 92); Roseville, New South Wales
- Known for: Painting
- Awards: Officer of the Order of the British Empire (OBE) (1973); Officer of the Order of Australia (AO) (1983)

Grace Cossington Smith AO OBE (20 April 1892 – 20 December 1984) was an Australian artist and pioneer of modernist painting in Australia and was instrumental in introducing Post-Impressionism to her home country. Examples of her work are held by every major gallery in Australia.

== Biography ==
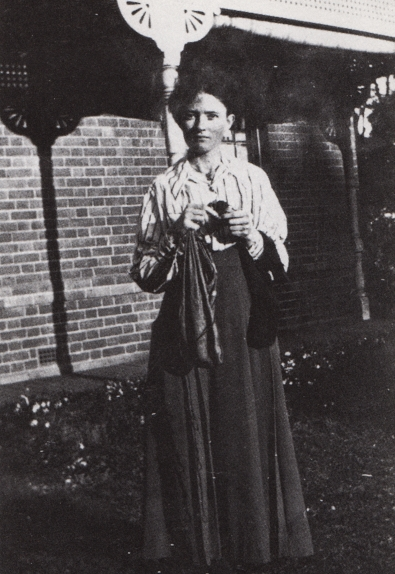
Smith, outside her home in Turramurra, 1915

She was born Grace Smith, in Neutral Bay, Sydney, second of five children of London-born solicitor Ernest Smith and his wife Grace, née Fisher, who was the daughter of the rector of Cossington in Leicestershire. The family moved to Thornleigh, New South Wales around 1890. Grace attended Abbotsleigh School for Girls in Wahroonga 1905–09 where Albert Collins and Alfred Coffey took art classes. From 1910 to 1911 she studied drawing with Antonio Dattilo Rubbo. From 1912 to 1914 she and her sister lived in England, staying with an aunt at Winchester where she attended drawing classes as well as classes at Stettin in Germany, and was exposed to paintings by Watteau in Berlin.

After returning to Sydney in 1914 she attended Dattilo Rubbo's painting classes alongside Norah Simpson and took an interest in modernist theories. Her The Sock Knitter (1915) has been acclaimed as Australia's first post-Impressionist painting to be exhibited in the Country.

Smith adopted the middle name "Cossington" in 1920.

Her work was greatly respected by fellow-artists Roland Wakelin and Roy de Maistre. She exhibited with the Royal Art Society of New South Wales from 1915, the Society of Artists from 1919 and Thea Proctor's Contemporary Group at Adrian Feint's Grosvenor Gallery from 1926 to 1928, and from 1932 to 1971, at the Macquarie Galleries.

Her painting style is characterised by individual, square brush strokes with bright unblended colours. Her many paintings of Sydney landscapes, still lifes, and interiors include Kuringai Avenue (1943), Fruit in the Window (1957), and, arguably her most famous painting, The Lacquer Room (1936). She received acclaim late in her career, and in 1973 a major retrospective exhibition of her work toured Australia.

== Notable works ==
Hailed as one of Australia's most important artists of the twentieth century, Cossington Smith was best known for her modernist depiction of a Sydney cafeteria, paintings of the arch of the Sydney Harbour Bridge as it was being built, and her late indoor scenes of doorways and windows where yellow is usually the dominant colour. Many of her scenes give a glimpse of the ordinary suburban home of her time: still lives, doorways and window sills. She also painted important events such as the World Wars and the arrival of the Prince of Wales in Sydney, which show a broader view of what was happening in Australia and the world at the time.

She used sunlight and patterns of vibrant colour with cool colours added to shadows, giving them a sense of energy. Using carefully placed brush strokes of brilliant colour side by side to build up small squares, she built form in colour. She was one of the earliest Australian artists to be influenced by the European Post-Impressionist movement and lead a break away from Australian Impressionism. A contemporary of Margaret Preston and Thea Proctor, her works were considered very daring for the time. Her main interest was colour and its interaction with reflected sunlight. She supported modernism and developed her own individual technique. It was said that she "did get a lot of criticism in the press, but she was very bold and she knew what she wanted".

== Cossington ==
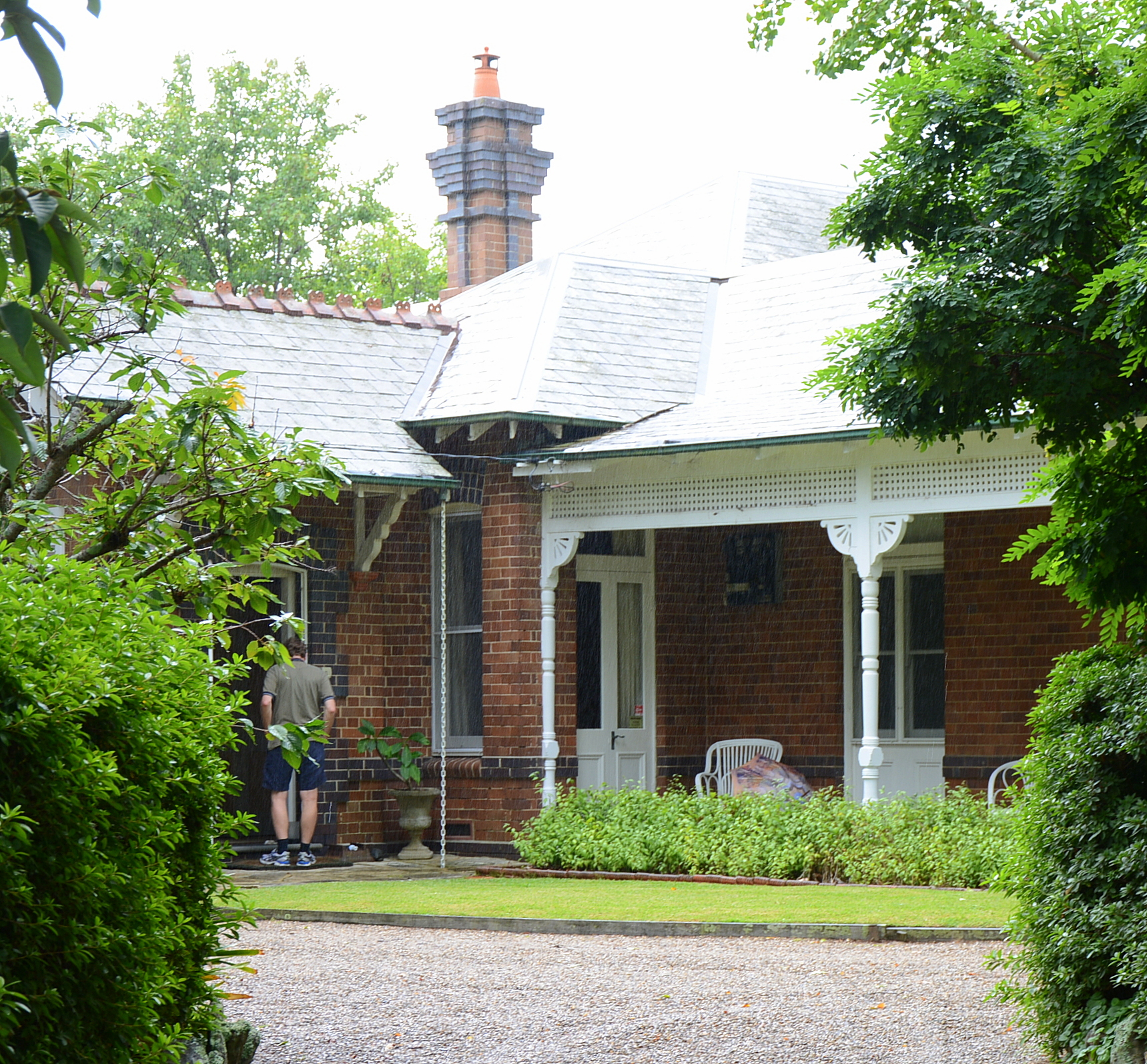
Cossington in Turramurra, Sydney

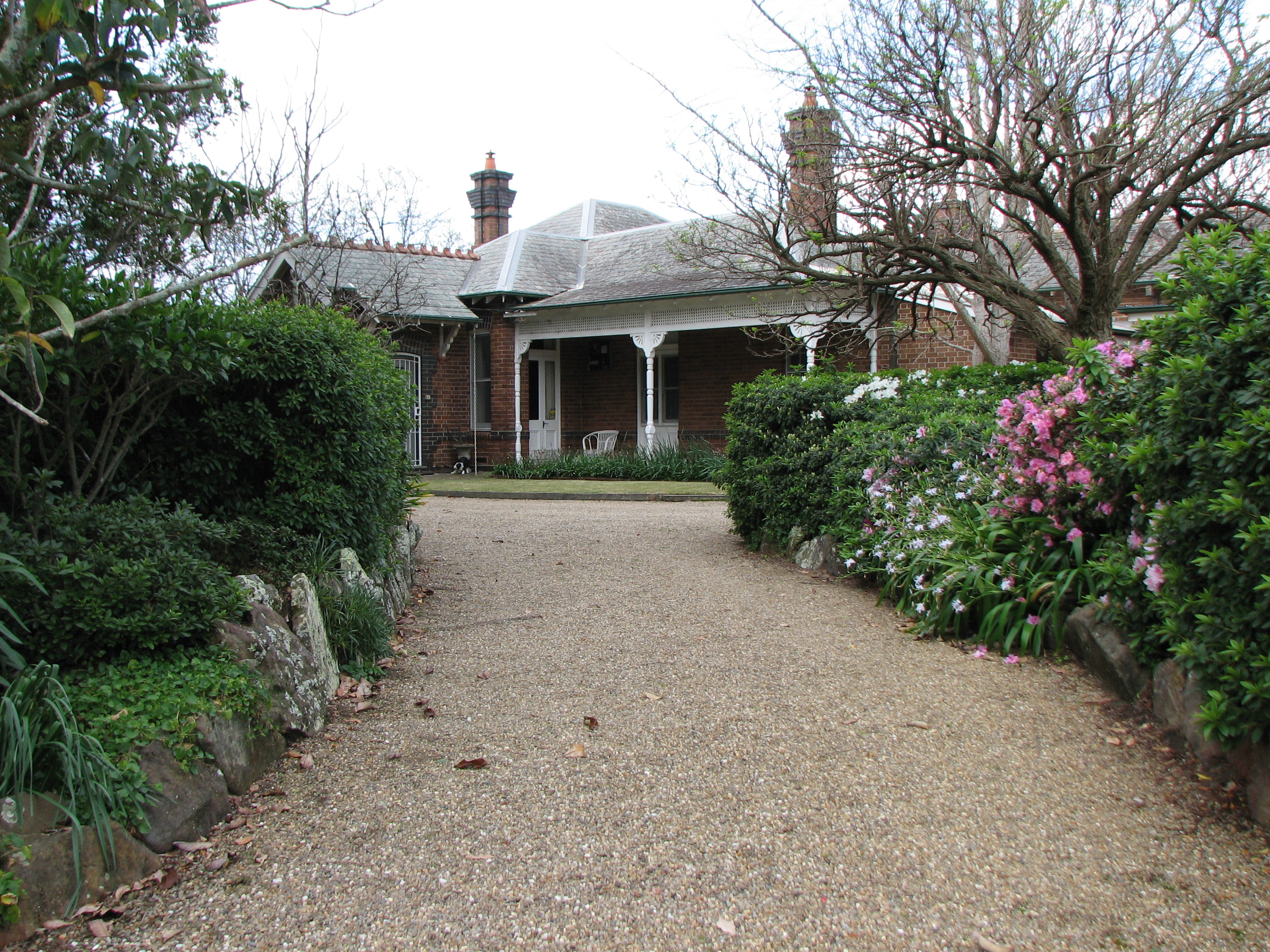
Cossington 43 Ku-Ring-Gai Avenue, Turramurra

Cossington Smith grew up in her family's first house, Cossington, in the Sydney suburb of Neutral Bay. In 1920, they moved to what had previously been a Quaker meeting-house, which they also called Cossington, at 43 Ku-Ring-Gai Avenue, Turramurra, where she was to live most of her life. Both were named after her mother's original home, Cossington Hall, in Leicestershire, England. Cossington in Turramurra is heritage-listed.

== First World War ==
Arriving in Australia back from a holiday to England shortly before the First World War began, Smith supported the war effort. Her 1915 painting The Sock Knitter, pictured her sister knitting socks for the war effort, is regarded as the first Post-Impressionist painting to be exhibited in Australia. She also later drew a series of cartoons which were satirical and anti-German, showing caricatures of German army figures. Such drawings of wartime figures were very different from the usual style in her work. Other works of the time were a drawing of Belgian refugees fleeing the Germans at the start of the war and one titled Reinforcements: troops marching (c. 1917) which show strong patterns and colour.

== Sydney ==
Cossington Smith painted the city of Sydney, its people, the crowds and places such as restaurants or Martin Place in the City Centre. She went to the city often to sketch, though she was somewhat embarrassed with drawing in public. When the Prince of Wales visited the city, Grace went to the city to record this event. She did sketches of the buildings around where she was standing, but relied on memory to record the actual moment when he passed by. Her painting, The Prince (1920), records the scene of the prince being driven in his car through the street lined with a large crowd of people. It depicts the warm reception which Australians gave to the British royalty at the time, when Australia was still very much part of the British Empire. She followed this painting with other paintings based on sketches done in Sydney city, of crowds of people rushing past in Rushing (c. 1922), almost at humorous pace, with one woman looking at the viewer with a surprised expression. These paintings depict Sydney as a busy city with large crowds of people going to and from their jobs. A less hurried crowd is shown in Crowd, which shows a massive crowd nonetheless, almost all of them wearing hats, reflecting the fashion of the time.

== Turramurra paintings ==
Cossington Smith's paintings of the area around Turramurra show the development of Sydney in the northern suburbs. Her street scenes often showed roads going up and down hills. Her landscapes were often based around a road. Her paintings, Eastern Road, Turramurra and ‘’Pentecost’’, show roads very similar to many of the roads around hilly Turramurra, which have many dips and bends in them.

== Modernism ==
Cossington Smith was one of the first artists to bring Modernism to Australia. Her painting The Sock Knitter, 1915, is widely celebrated. It was "acclaimed as the first post-impressionist painting to be exhibited in Australia." The painting shows a girl studiously working away, knitting from a ball of yarn which sits delicately by her side. When taken in the context of the war, it could be interpreted as someone working on something small to help a greater cause.

Cossington Smith studied in Australia and England and her work was informed by the Modernist paintings of Europe, she shared the Modernist concerns about painting, including: investigating colour theory, playing with the picture plane (the illusion of depth in a painting), the use of expressive brush strokes and an abstracted composition. About The Sock Knitter it is said that "The extreme flattening of the picture plane and the use of bright, expressive, broken colour applied in broad brush-strokes to delineate form reflects the aesthetic concerns of European painters such as Cézanne, Matisse and van Gogh." Despite these tendencies she became a foundation member of, and exhibited with, Robert Menzies' anti-modernist organisation, the Australian Academy of Art.

Some of her paintings from around 1932–33 reflected some common interests of international contemporary painters. These paintings show objects being broken down into forms based on their colours similar to Cézanne, and have a cubist manipulation of some of the imagery. Her House With Trees, 1935, shows houses in pink, with unnatural blues for some of the bushes surrounding them. A distortion of the realist colours is apparent, with distortion also of the perspective lines of the actual house.

The Lacquer Room (1936), showing a view across an Art Deco styled café called the Soda Fountain, which was then located in the David Jones department store in Sydney. The work itself is highly stylised, with pinks, yellows and blues on the walls and on the floor. The people depicted have little detail shown in their faces, though in what is shown they look obviously surprised and somewhat condescending in their glance towards the viewer. The vibrant glaring colours reflect modern style. The painting is notable for its absence of shadow; the walls are glowing with bright non-directional light and colour. Everything about the painting seems modern, from trendy green table tops to pinkish and red colours on the chairs and on the walls. Two unusual yellow modern style lamps on the walls have an Art Deco look. The customers wear fur coats with stylish hats, giving an impression that this is a place for respectable, middle-class people. The waitresses wear a bright green colour in keeping with the rest. The chairs have huge backs and tiny legs, reflecting a new modern world of manufactured objects, rather than traditional wooden furniture.

Smith's paintings included arrangements of flowers consisting of daffodils, hippeastrums and waratahs. As part of her personal oeuvre, she painted a work of a dog sleeping called Krinkley Kronks Sleeping in cool purples and oranges, although the actual name of the dog was Rex.

Smith's work featured among that of 50 women in a 2025 exhibition co-presented by Agsa and the Art Gallery of New South Wales (AGNSW) and entitled 'Dangerously Modern Australian Women Artists in Europe 1890-1940'.

== Sydney Harbour Bridge paintings ==
The Bridge in Curve (1930)

Her paintings of the Sydney Harbour Bridge as it was being built are some of the best painted at the turn of the century when it was a symbol of what the people of Australia are capable of. Her first paintings of the harbour bridge such as The Bridge in Curve were of the bridge before the actual work on the arms had started, and to disguise this fact she concentrated more on painting the pylons in her earlier paintings of the bridge. She painted the arches as they were approaching one another, liking the tension between the two sides, and did not paint the bridge after it was completed. Though the painting The Bridge in Curve (1930) was rejected from the Society of Artists exhibition in 1930 it is now considered one of Australia's best modernist paintings. It shows the construction work continuing, with cranes fixed over the edges of both sides of the bridge. Her highly detailed drawn study for the painting shows her eye for details and her ability to capture a scene in a photo-realistic manner. Smith did in fact draw the Harbour Bridge completed in Great White Ship at Circular Quay, but here as the title suggests, the focus is more upon the ship in the foreground than the bridge itself.

== Second World War ==
As with the First World War, she also depicted the Second World War in various ways. She painted pictures showing the arrival of allied troops in France, a dinner with allied leaders at Yalta, and a mass after the war ended in remembrance of the war. Church Interior (1941) shows a scene in a church where men are mostly absent, having gone off to the war. A later church scene, Thanksgiving Service, shows a church with the British Union Jack and the Red Ensign in the background, a celebration of the victory in the war after it had finished. Several of her other paintings show large British flags, reflecting not only her own British heritage and patriotism, but also the fact that many Australians still thought of themselves as being part of the British Empire at this time. During the war she served as a warden, which meant she was in charge of getting people out of the houses in Kur-ring-gai Avenue if there was any trouble. She depicted a meeting of wardens in the painting Wardens' Meeting (1943), which shows a line of people sitting on chairs, looking solemn and possibly chatting quietly. Dawn Landing (1944) shows troops and a tank disembarking from a ship after the Allied landings in France. An event which marked the beginning of the end of the Nazi occupation of Europe, it was unusual for her to paint a scene of something not directly before her. Similarly seeming somewhat at odds with the rest of her work, is the painting of Signing (1945), depicting the signing of the peace treaty at Yalta, which shows seated figures who are vaguely recognisable as the three allied world leaders. This event must have been very important for her to paint as she almost always painted scenes from personal experience, rather than ones of people on the other side of the world.

== Landscapes ==
She painted outdoor scenes, somewhat less successfully than her indoor scenes, but painted outside whenever someone could take her out in the countryside to paint, going on many trips. In her life she visited several towns outside Sydney, as well as visiting the national capital, Canberra. She also painted in the Blue Mountains, and in Moss Vale and Exeter. Beginning in the late 1930s, she started a style which was less influenced by the modernist one, and more to do with the light and colour of Australia, and her own personal interpretation of the landscape. Her paintings show the olive green and sienna colours of the Australian bush, depicted in a style where the brush strokes are visible, made up of many similar colours. One of her best landscapes was a series of four large paintings she did called Four panels for a screen: loquat tree, gum and wattle trees, waterfall, picnic in the gully#, 1929. The first two panels show the trees in her yard, while the last two show the world further away from her home; a waterfall and people having a picnic with a billy can in a gully. It symbolises the theme and division in her landscape work between her immediate streets and trees, and further away from her home, where her friends and relatives often took her to paint. The four paintings were done on commission; however, the commission was refused, and because of this Smith would never work on a large commission again.

== Overseas ==
She visited England once with her sister between 1912 and 1914, and returned to Europe later, between 1948 and 1951. On her overseas trips, Grace experienced a world different from her own, yet in her paintings gave it her own unique style. On the second trip she became very interested in English architecture and, besides sketches and drawings of cathedrals and buildings, took many photos of indoor doorways and scenes of rooms inside houses. Her many sketchbooks reveal something of her life – being more loose and personal than larger paintings, sketchbooks can give more of an insight into the details of the artist's everyday life.

Increasingly she would concentrate on these interior views, with ten room paintings exhibited in her solo exhibition of 1947. Her large oil, Interior with verandah doors (1954), shows an accurate depiction of her house with a large window and a door opening to the outside on the other side of the bed. The painting is the first of her larger room interior paintings and prominently features yellow in the colouring. She also experimented with views in mirrors, such as in Interior with wardrobe mirror (1955), which shows a mirror on an open wardrobe door that is opened at a 45-degree angle, whereby the viewer is given a view of the yard outside the house from the reflection in the glass. The angular cutting into the basic composition with these doors adds dynamism and gives it an energetic feel.

In all her later paintings she used a unique style of squarish daubs of paint applied on the canvas, in colours which were varied but which tended towards the yellow end of the spectrum. Many of her room interior paintings show the same room from different angles, or even multiple views from a slightly different or the same angle. In some paintings a door or window is the dominant focus for the painting, while in others the viewer is shown the entire room. Her use of colour has been compared to the work of Pierre Bonnard, though she said she found Cézanne a more important influence on her. Her style of many multi-coloured brush strokes was used not only in her interior views, but also in her still lives.

== Later still life ==
Grace's later still life are works that explore the use of different colours put together to give a unifying feel. She painted many still life of fruit, jugs and vases with glimpses of drapery and parts of the room behind. In style, they consisted of many individual, choppy, squarish brush strokes making up the whole, varied in colour, but still giving an overall yellowish feel. She has a striking sense of perspective, and great eye for detail, planting the objects firmly in three-dimensional space. Still life with red vase (1962), shows a bold red vase contrasted with the background made from its complementary opposite colour, green, or at least, greenish-yellow. Another jug to the right blends in with the background, while the red jug is firmly planted in the perspective of the table. Still life with white cup and saucer (1971), one of her last paintings, shows several jugs, green, red and yellow, all given a sense of being very solid objects, with a delightful white cup and saucer nearby. She was very frail after this, being unable to paint any more large works.

From 1914 Grace had painted in a small studio hut in the garden, beyond the tennis lawn. Her mother died in 1931, her father in 1938, and she became head of the Cossington household. A larger well-lit studio was added to the house, adjacent to her large bedroom.

=== Awards ===
In 1973 Smith was made an Officer of the Order of the British Empire (OBE). For her services to Australian art, she was appointed an Officer of the Order of Australia in 1983. The Governor of New South Wales visited Cossington Smith in her nursing home to award her the honour.

Cossington Smith died on 20 December 1984 in Roseville, New South Wales.

== Grace Cossington Smith Gallery ==
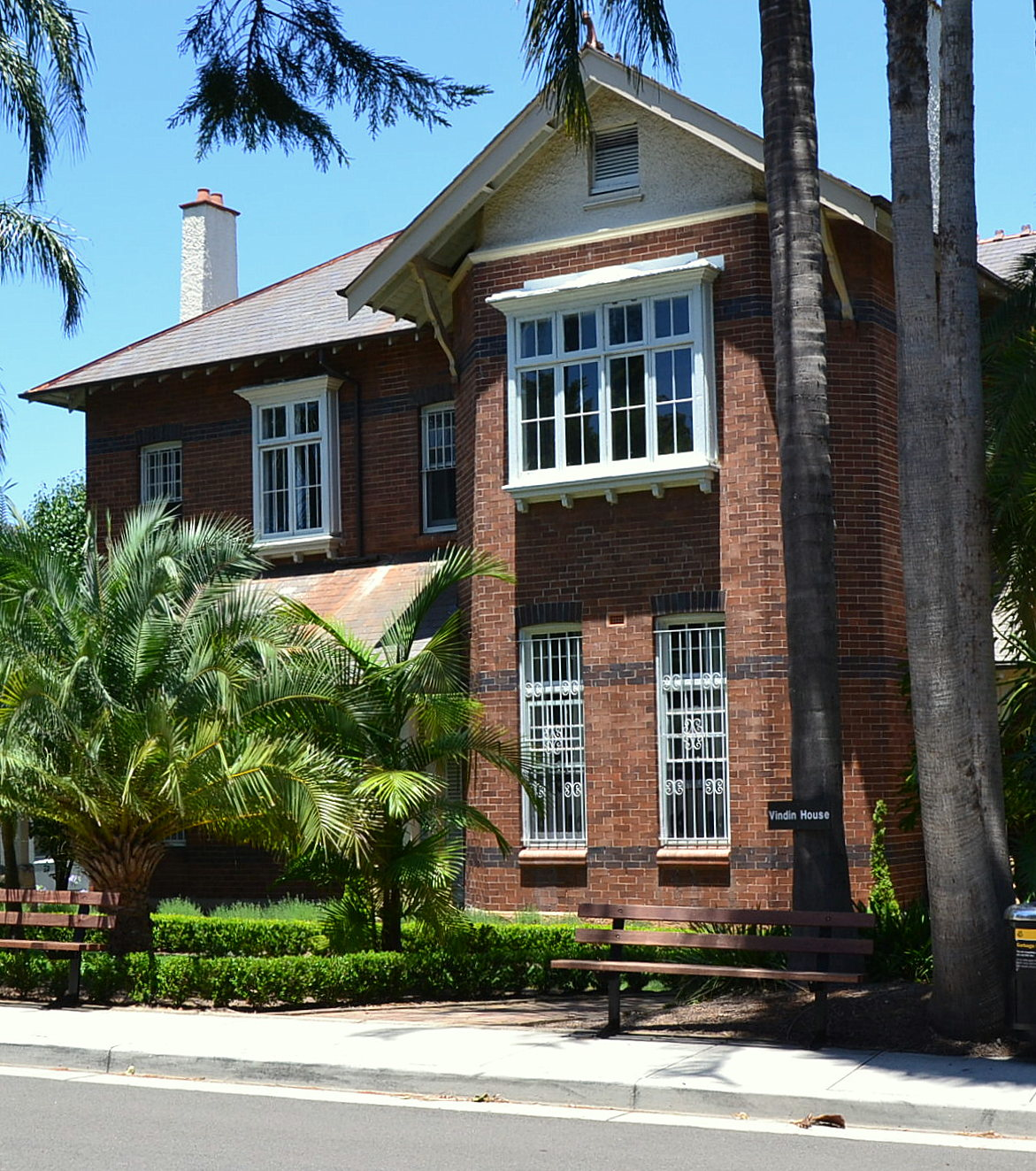
Vindin House at Abbotsleigh School

The Grace Cossington Smith Gallery was opened in Abbotsleigh Senior School on the Pacific Highway, Wahroonga, in 2013. The site of this gallery is Vindin House, a former boarding house for girls. The gallery holds different exhibitions throughout the year. On the second floor is the Year 12 art studio, where HSC students study the arts. The gallery is open to the public from Monday to Saturday from 9 am until 5 pm.
