= Antonio Dattilo Rubbo =

Italian painter (1870–1955)

Antonio Dattilo-Rubbo
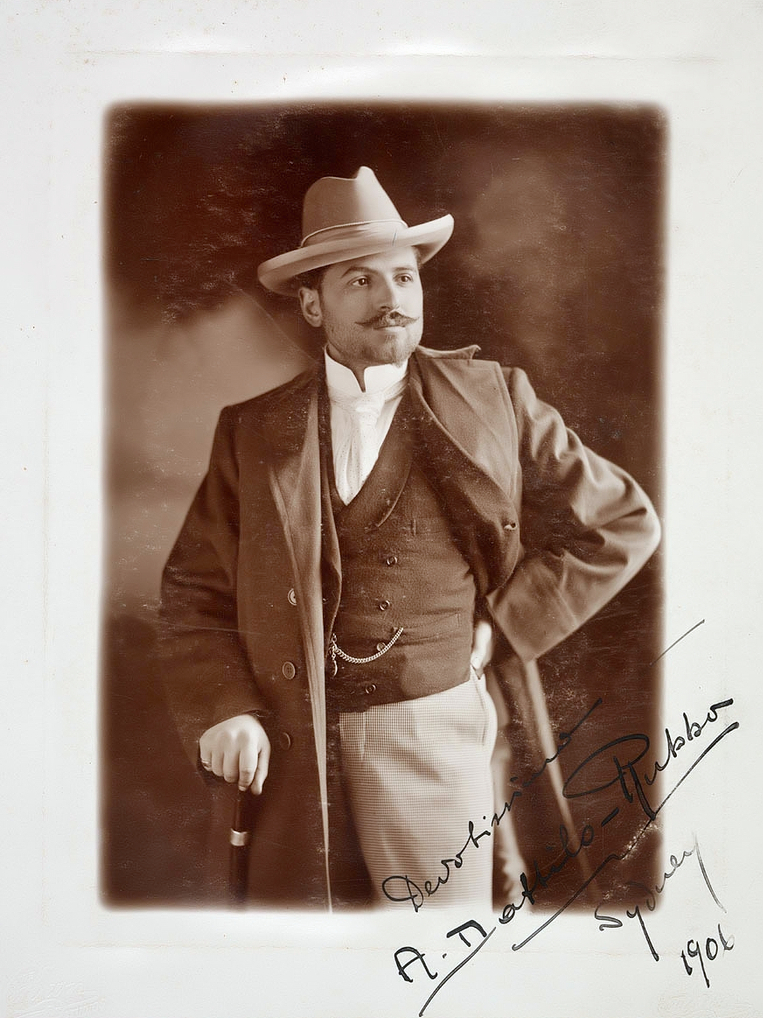
- Born: Antonio Salvatore Dattilo Rubbo; 21 June 1870; Naples, Italy
- Died: 1 June 1955 (aged 84); Mosman, Sydney, Australia
- Education: Royal Academy of Fine Arts, Naples
- Known for: Painting, art teaching
- Spouse: Mildred Russell Jobson (m. 1904)
- Children: 2
- Awards: Cavaliere of the Order of the Crown of Italy (1932)

Antonio Salvatore Dattilo Rubbo (21 June 1870 – 1 June 1955) was an Italian-born artist and art teacher active in Australia from 1897. Although his own painting remained largely academic, his atelier and his classes at the Royal Art Society of New South Wales were unusually open to modern ideas, and it was his students who produced Australia's earliest modernist paintings.

== Early life ==
Rubbo, or Dattilo-Rubbo, was born in Italy in Naples in 1870, and spent his early childhood in the Neapolitan municipality of Frattamaggiore. A drawing prize won at the age of fourteen paid for study in Rome, where he qualified as a draughtsman in 1888. Four years of compulsory military service followed. He kept painting throughout, taking his fellow soldiers as portrait subjects, and used his leave to see Italy's great collections. He enrolled at Naples' Royal Academy of Fine Arts in 1893. His teachers there included Domenico Morelli and Filippo Palizzi, and he left in 1896 with the academy's diploma, qualifying him to teach drawing in public institutions.

== Career in Australia ==
A short stint in the family grain business did not take, and in 1897, he sailed for Australia, reaching Sydney on 13 November. One of his first friends in the colony was the artist Eirene Mort. He lodged with her family at Strathfield, where he taught an art class to cover his board while the Morts helped him learn English.

From 1898, he taught at several Sydney schools. In 1899, after the National Art Gallery of New South Wales purchased his painting titled A veteran, he was able to establish his atelier at Rowe Street, Sydney. The location of his Rowe Street studio flat drew him into Sydney's Bohemian circles. The artist Margaret Coen recalled him as "darkly handsome, his brown eyes flashing, and sporting a black goatee beard, a long scarf flung carelessly round his neck; he always wore a dark green Borsalino hat pulled low to one side".

The atelier taught drawing from life, and within a few years, only Julian Ashton's Sydney Art School rivalled it . He joined the Royal Art Society of NSW in 1900 and was a long-standing teacher in the School there from 1907 to 1934.

In 1903, he was naturalised and changed his surname to Dattillo-Rubbo. On 10 December 1904, at Paddington, he married Mildred Russell Jobson, who had studied under him. They had two sons; his eldest son, Sydney Dattilo Rubbo (1911–1969), was a professor of bacteriology at the University of Melbourne.

== Influence on Australian Modernism ==
Rubbo returned to Europe in 1906, visiting Italy, France and England to tour the art schools, exhibitions and galleries. Upon his return to Australia, though he continued to teach along academic lines, Rubbo encouraged his students to paint in the style that interested them. What they saw broadened considerably after 1913, when Norah Simpson came home from London and Paris and brought news of modernist painting directly into his classes.` As a result, Rubbo's classes became a hotbed for the emergence of Australia's first modernist paintings, most notably from Grace Cossington Smith (whom Dattilo Rubbo referred to affectionately as 'Mrs Van Gogh'), and Roy de Maistre and Roland Wakelin. In contrast to other art teachers in Australia at the time, he encouraged his students to experiment with Post-Impressionism and Cubism styles, even though they were radically different from his own work, which more closely reflected a mix of Realism and Impressionistic elements.

He was a flamboyant character who believed in championing his students to the hilt. There are several recorded instances of him defending his students' work, including in 1916 when he challenged a committee member of the Royal Art Society to a duel because they refused to hang a post-impressionist landscape by his pupil Roland Wakelin. His other students included Frank Hinder, Donald Friend ("Aha Donaldo, always the barocco; rub it out, boy, rub it out!"), war artist Roy Hodgkinson, Archibald Prize winner Arthur Murch, social realist Roy Dalgarno, Tom Bass, and very probably Muriel Binney.

In 1916, he relocated with his family to Manly and in 1919 was appointed to the War Memorials Advisory Board. In 1924, he moved his atelier to Bligh Street, much larger premises and founded the Atelier Club. In that same year, he joined the committee of the newly founded Manly Art Gallery and Historical Collection (now the Manly Art Gallery & Museum), making the gallery's first donation, his painting Aboriginal Head. The gallery now holds over one hundred and thirty of his works, with a room in the gallery named in his honour in 1940.

== Painting ==
The modernism Rubbo tolerated in the classroom left little mark on his own work. He was an eclectic who drew on the nineteenth-century popular styles of Impressionism, Realism and Naturalism. The critic Robert Hughes later observed that "muddy genre portraits of very wrinkled old Tuscan peasants were his strong suit". His late work retreated into academic convention, and the older Rubbo became, at times, an outspoken critic of the very movement he had once helped along.

His portraits were regularly hung in the Wynne and Archibald Prizes, and in 1947 he was commissioned to paint the official posthumous portrait of Prime Minister John Curtin for Parliament House, Canberra. Seventeen of his works are held in The Art Gallery of New South Wales, including A veteran (1899), The strike's aftermath (1913) and a 1924 self-portrait.

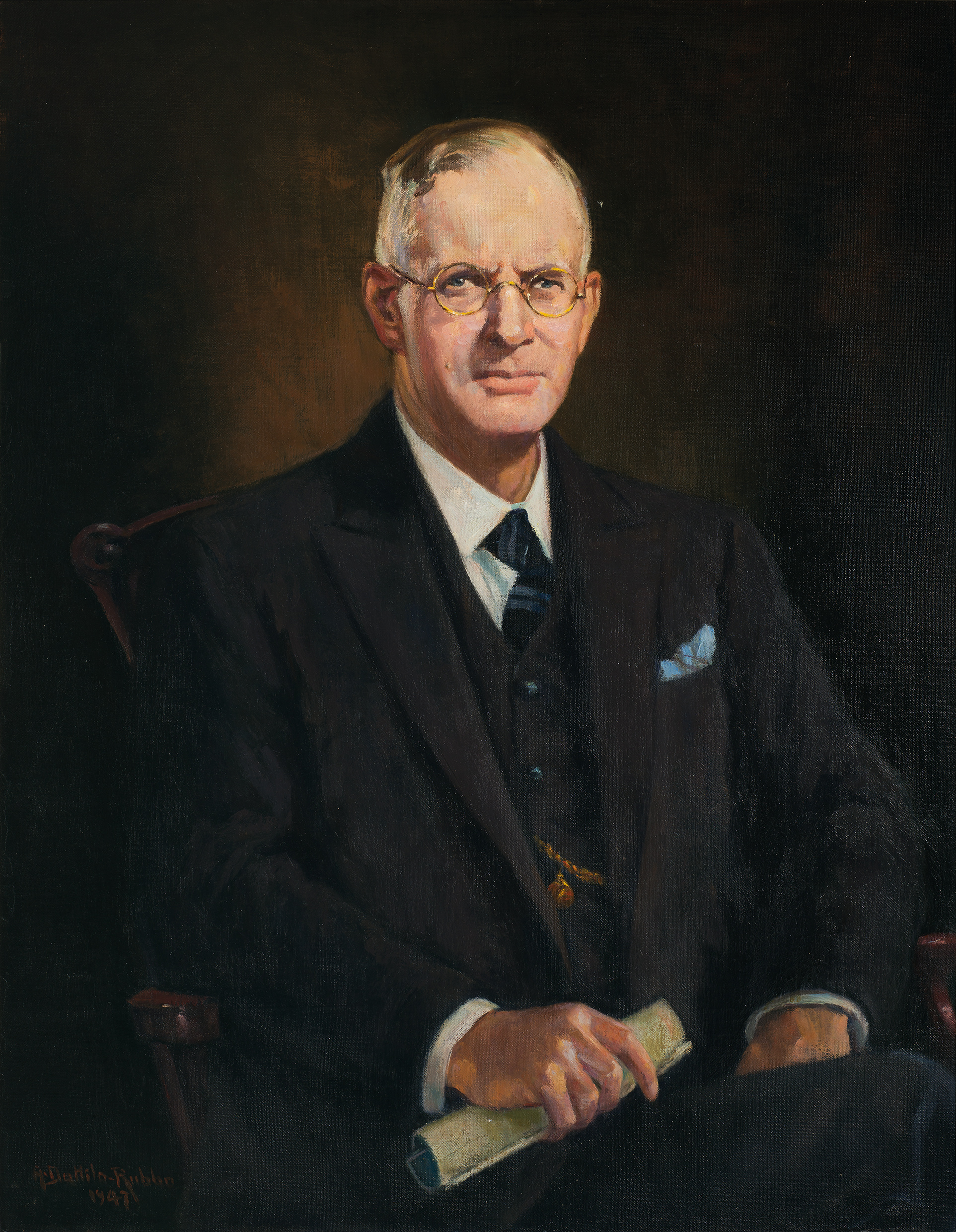
Official Portrait of John Curtin by Antonio Dattilo Rubbo, 1947

He founded the Dante Alighieri Art and Literary Society, and in 1954 became a life member of the Society of Artists.

== Later life and death ==
As critical attention drifted away from him in the 1930s and 1940s, Rubbo gave away a large amount of his own work to public galleries, to schools and societies, and to wartime fundraising.

He was arrested in 1940 as a potentially subversive enemy alien and briefly interned as a result of Italy's entering the Second World War. He continued to donate his work to charities throughout the war period. A former student, Frances Ellis, took over the management of his atelier classes in 1941.

On his retirement, one of his teaching staff, Giuseppe Fontanelli Bissietta, a member of the Six Directions group, took over the Antonio Dattilo Rubbo School in Century House, 70 Pitt Street.

Rubbo died on 1 June 1955 in his sleep at his Mosman home and was cremated. He had suffered from angina for many years.

== Legacy ==
Rubbo is remembered less for his own painting than as the teacher who opened Australian art students to modernism. In 1922, the Royal Art Society appointed their first eight Fellows, among them Dattilo-Rubbo, William Lister Lister, Charles Bryant, J. S. Watkins, Lawson Balfour, James R. Jackson, Sir John Langstaff and Margaret Preston. A decade later in 1932, Rubbo was honoured with the title Cavaliere of the Order of the Crown of Italy.

A retrospective of his work was held at the Manly Art Gallery & Museum from December 1980 to January 1981, and the gallery's Dattilo-Rubbo Gallery remains named for him. His self-portrait and portrait by Evelyn Chapman are held by the Art Gallery of New South Wales, and Arthur Murch's 1935 portrait of him is in the National Portrait Gallery.

During his lifetime, he donated to the Municipality of Frattamaggiore six of his works, including a self-portrait, on the occasion of the National Painting Exhibition of 1955. He also contributed AUD£50 for the purchase of classically inspired paintings for a municipal art gallery to be established. In recognition of his generosity, the Municipality awarded him honorary citizenship and a gold medal, which arrived after his death.

== See also ==
- Art of Australia
