= The Sock Knitter =

1915 painting by Grace Cossington Smith

- Artist: Grace Cossington Smith
- Year: 1915
- Medium: oil on canvas
- Dimensions: 61.8 cm × 51.2 cm (24.3 in × 20.2 in)
- Location: Art Gallery of New South Wales; Sydney

The Sock Knitter is a 1915 painting by the Australian artist Grace Cossington Smith. The painting depicts a woman, believed to be the artist's sister, knitting a sock. It was the first work by Cossington Smith to be exhibited and has been "acclaimed as the first post-impressionist painting to be exhibited in Australia."

The figure is pressed forward onto the picture plane. Tightly constructed. The creamy impasto paint of the backgrounds holds the picture together. The sitter then holds the background together. Like a jigsaw. She is the pattern maker. There are echoing triangles everywhere.

— Julia Ritson,

The work was included in the Follow the Flag exhibition held at the National Gallery of Victoria in 2015. Exhibition material stated that The Sock Knitter "has come to symbolise Australian women’s contribution to the [First World War] effort, which included knitting more than 1.3 million pairs of socks".

The painting was acquired by the Art Gallery of New South Wales in 1960.
