= Roland Wakelin =

New Zealand-born Australian painter

- Born: 17 April 1887; Greytown, New Zealand
- Died: 28 May 1971 (aged 84)
- Education: Wellington Technical School; Royal Art Society
- Occupation: Painter

Roland Wakelin (17 April 1887 – 28 May 1971) was a New Zealand-born Australian painter and teacher.

== Early life ==
Roland Shakespeare Wakelin was born on 17 April 1887 in Greytown, New Zealand. He studied at Wellington Technical School from 1902 to 1903. Shortly after, while working in the Land and Income Tax Department, he took night classes in painting under Henri Bastings. In 1908 and 1909, he visited his brother in Sydney then in 1912 joined him, then enrolled in the Royal Art Society School to study drawing and painting under Dattilo Rubbo alongside fellow students Grace Cossington Smith, Norah Simpson and Roy de Maistre.

== Career ==
The fruit seller of Farm Cove, 1915

In 1913, he started working at the New South Wales Land Tax Office. In 1914, he started working as a ticket writer for Mark Foy's and David Jones department stores, then from 1916 worked for the commercial art firm of Smith and Julius. In this position, Wakelin found himself working alongside “fellow artists such as Lloyd Rees and James Muir Auld.” Early in 1919, he commenced study at the Royal Art Society’s classes “where he found a sympathetic teacher in A. Datillo Rubbo.” Later in 1919, together with Roy de Maistre, he held a two-man exhibition Colour in Art influenced by Cézanne, Gauguin and Van Gogh at Gayfield Shaw's art salon in Sydney. Before leaving for London, Wakelin exhibited at the art gallery of Anthony Horden and Sons. A review in the Sydney Morning Herald described his work as "daring," displaying "a splendid audacity" and a "spirit of modernism."

He worked in London as a freelance artist (spending some time in Paris) from 1922 to 1924. Wakelin needed to work in England to keep his family and obtained employment with “Hopwoods and Cinads advertising agencies. He worked as an illustrator and scenario writer.”

On his return to Sydney in 1925 he held an exhibition of his work, largely influenced by Cézanne, at John Young's Macquarie Galleries. An insight into his professional life can be found in a comment in the Daily Telegraph in 1928. The writer describes Wakelin as "the most solitary artist in Sydney," who "for fifteen years has worked practically alone." In 1934 he was elected a member of the Society of Artists. “In 1935, the Art Gallery of New South Wales acquired its first Wakelin, Mount Wellington.” He held frequent further exhibitions between 1928 and 1970, with a memorial exhibition held in 1972. An example of his work, exhibited in 1944 at the Macquarie Galleries, the reviewer describes Wakelin as having an exploring temperament and "one of our most forceful painters."

From 1924 to 1941, he worked for the commercial art firm of O'Brien Publishers. From Wakelin’s return to Australia in 1924 and through the 1930s, he experienced lean times. “His job as a commercial artist at O’Brien Publishers was halved during the Depression.” From 1942 to 1949, he worked in the drawing department of Edward H O'Brien, who were joint venturers with the Postmaster General's Department (now Telstra) for the end-to-end production of the Yellow Pages, a local Australian business directory. He was in Melbourne in 1950–51 teaching at the National Gallery School then in the University of Sydney from 1952 teaching part-time, mostly to architecture students. From 1956 to 1957, he toured Europe, visiting England, The Netherlands, France and Italy.

Along with De Maistre and Grace Cossington Smith, Wakelin is regarded as the founder of the modern movement in Sydney.

A retrospective of Wakelin’s work was held by the Art Gallery of New South Wales in 1967. The exhibition highlighted how Wakelin’s subject matter revolved around his personal life and holidays. The landscapes included scenes from Hinton, Bathurst, Mount Saddleback, Terrigal, and Canberra. More personal subject matter included his daughter Judith, his wife Estelle, Roland Jr., and close friend and fellow artist, Douglas Dundas.

In 2003, Newcastle Region Art Gallery held an exhibition of Wakelin’s paintings, the first comprehensive exhibition since the 1967 retrospective. The gallery described the artists’ search for artistic expression as beginning “from near abstraction, through a post-impressionistic and Cézannesque interpretation of the 1920s and 1930s, to a romantic vision in later life.”

== Gallery holdings ==
- Art Gallery of New South Wales. 55 works including this 1923 self-portrait.
- State Library of New South Wales. 4 works including "Picnic at the Rocks," 1952.
- National Portrait Gallery. Self-portrait, 1962.
- National Gallery of Victoria. 8 works including "Girl in a purple dress," 1918.
- Newcastle Art Gallery. 9 works including "The train to the mountains," 1943.

== Death ==
He died on 28 May 1971.

== Sources ==
- Encyclopedia of Australian Art, Alan McCulloch, Hutchison of London, 1968
- Lynn, Elwyn (1977). "Ronald Wakelin" The Australian Landscape and its Artists. Bay Books. pp. 98–101. ISBN 0 85835 143-9.
- Rumley, Katrina (2002). Roland Wakelin, master of colour : a Newcastle Region Art Gallery travelling exhibition. Newcastle, NSW: Newcastle Region Art Gallery. ISBN 0-7347-2032-7. OCLC 223372498.
- Wakelin, Roland. Roland Wakelin retrospective. Sydney, N.S.W. : The Art Gallery of New South Wales, 1967.
- Walton, Leslie; Walker, Penny (1987). The Art of Roland Wakelin. Seaforth, N.S.W.: Craftsman House. ISBN 0-947131-00-0. OCLC 19118655.
