= Australian Academy of Art =

Australian anti-modernist art organisation (1937–1947)

The Australian Academy of Art was a conservative Australian government-authorised art organisation which operated for ten years between 1937 and 1946 and staged annual exhibitions. Its demise resulted from opposition by Modernist artists, especially those associated with the Contemporary Art Society, though the influence of the Academy continued into the 1960s.

== History ==
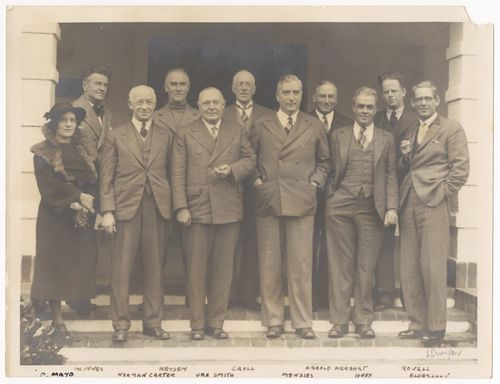
Les Dwyer (1937). Foundation members of the Australian Academy of Art, Canberra, 19 Jun 1937. Back row, left to right: McInnes, Heysen, Croll, Harold Herbert, Rowell. Front row, left to right: D. Mayo, Norman Carter, Ure Smith, Menzies, Hoff, Eldershaw. Daphne Mayo Collection, University of Queensland

=== Precedents ===
Efforts to form an art academy in Australia were initially limited to individual States: The Academy of Arts, Australia, under the presidentship of P. Fletcher Watson was founded in Sydney in 1891, with its first exhibition held in 1892, but survived only four years. The Society of Artists, founded in Sydney in 1897, and the Australian Artists’ Association, of Melbourne, both had members from various States, but held their regular exhibitions only in their home states.

=== Formation ===
Aspiring to the principles of the long-established, but independent, privately funded, and also by then conservative, British Royal Academy of Arts (founded in 1768), Attorney-General Robert Menzies envisaged an overarching, Federal organisation promoting art that would be "understood by" the ordinary Australian amongst the middle class who were his prime supporters in his later prime-ministerships.

In The Argus of 3 May 1937 in an article headed "Does Not Like the "cross-eyed drawing" of Modern Art," he was reported to take issue with the idea that this might be de facto censorship of "those whose conception of art is not his," as had been suggested by Mr. Norman Macgeorge in a letter published the previous Saturday. MacGeorge, Menzies responded, was "misinformed about the object of the proposed Australian Academy;"

It is true, however, as Mr. Macgeorge claims, that I find nothing but absurdity in much so-called modern art, with its evasion of real problems and its cross-eyed drawing. It is equally true that I think that in art beauty is the condition of immortality - a conclusion strengthened by an examination of the works of the great European masters and that the language of beauty ought to be capable of being understood by reasonably cultivated people who are not themselves artists. I realise that an academy should find room in its membership for all schools of artistic thought provided they are based on competent craftsmanship. So much do I realise this truth, which I take to be the basis of Mr. Macgeorge's letter, that at the outset, when mentioning the academy idea to a committee of artists, I stipulated that I would take no steps to further it unless this principle were adhered to. The published list of those invited to join the proposed academy is the best proof that the principle has been followed. The list was selected by artists of the highest standing. My only function has been, and is, as an uninstructed lover of fine painting and drawing, to do as much as I can to help obtain for Australia the benefits of an artistic organisation which has been invaluable in England."

Subsequently, at a meeting of ten state delegates in the smokeroom of the Canberra Hotel, Menzies formed the Australian Academy of Art, on 19 June 1937 and was its inaugural chair. Where long-established European art academies were teaching institutions, the Australian Academy was not, and served to present annual salons by invitation to established artists. Its other role was to advise government on art administration as "a body which will be recognised as a standard reference on art." It was to be the second such academy in the British dominions, following Canada's which was established in 1880 with a Royal charter, which was sought also by Australia's.

Against the background of the 1939 Herald Exhibition of French and British Contemporary Art, the Academy was to persist in its anti-Modernist stance, with one member, Norman St Clair Carter, describing 'contemporary art' as a 'fungoid growth.' While tolerating some Australian post-impressionism, its exhibitions showed traditional figurative and realist paintings by John Longstaff (the first Academy president), Hans Heysen, William Dargie, John Longstaff, Elioth Gruner and Charles Mere as examples of conventional academic values of draughtsmanship and technical prowess; the Modernists' innovation and originality meant they were excluded. Its first catalogue announced that its nationalist, doctrinaire intent;

...marks a definite move towards the co-ordination of the artistic activities in a true Federal spirit. Hitherto there has not existed an institution which has adequately represented the whole continent. Nor has there been a body of artists who could speak with one authoritative voice on the many questions that concern the right development of the Fine Arts of this country. It is hoped, then, as the Academy proceeds with its work, the Federal and State Governments, as well as the general public, will realize the value that such an institution can be to the community, not only as a group of artists representing various points of view in their work but also as an advisory body which works in the interests of government and people alike.

=== Influence and demise ===
The organisation failed to obtain a royal charter when opposed by the Contemporary Art Society and other modernist groups, so its last annual exhibition was in 1947, although its influence remained through former members who were assembling national collections, writing art criticism and teaching art, in particular through those who were instructors or administrators at Melbourne's National Gallery School. Those who held roles as curators, or who were critics for newspapers and magazines had direct influence on the public. William Nicholas Rowell was appointed drawing master at the National Gallery in 1941 and was acting head of its art school briefly in 1946. William Beckwith (Billy) McInnes was acting-director at the National Gallery of Victoria (1935) and an instructor in its art school, while The Age critic James Stuart (Jimmy) MacDonald supported Menzies and reviled George Bell, and Lionel Lindsay used his art criticism in the Melbourne Herald to spruik the organisation.

== Foundation members ==
By June 1937 it was announced that forty-seven artists had accepted invitations to be foundation members. The initiators appear in a group photograph taken on the day of the Academy's founding, and representing five states of the Commonwealth, but not Western Australia;

=== New South Wales ===
- James Muir Auld
- Norman Carter
- Douglas Dundas
- Mary Edwards
- Adrian Feint
- Elioth Gruner
- E. A. Harvey
- George Rayner Hoff (died November 1937)
- James Ranalph Jackson
- Frederick William (Fred) Leist
- Lionel Lindsay
- Kenneth Macqueen
- Arthur Murch
- Thea Proctor
- Adelaide Elizabeth Perry
- Margaret Preston
- Albert Ernest Newbury
- Lloyd Rees
- Maud Sherwood
- Grace Cossington Smith
- Sydney Ure Smith
- Roland Wakelin
- Professor Leslie Wilkinson

=== Victoria ===
- William Leslie Bowles
- Ernest Buckmaster
- Colin Colahan
- Alexander Colquhoun
- Archie Colquhoun
- Harley Griffiths (Jnr.)
- Harry B. Harrison
- Harold Herbert
- William Dunn Knox
- John Longstaff (first president 1938-41)
- Max Meldrum
- Percy Meldrum
- Violet McInnes
- William Beckwith (Billy) McInnes
- Paul Montford (died January 1948)
- H. Septimus Power
- James Quinn
- William Rowell
- Arnold Shore
- Dora Wilson

=== Queensland ===
- Vida Lahey
- Daphne Mayo
- Harold Parker

=== South Australia ===
- Hans Heysen

=== Tasmania ===
- John Eldershaw

In addition to the foundation members, others who showed in the annual exhibitions hosted by the Academy were William Wallace Anderson (exhibited in the 1939 and 1943 shows), Archibald Bertram Webb (1938), Frank Charles Medworth (1939), Joshua Smith (1938), Lyndon Raymond Dadswell (1938), Amalie Sara Colquhoun (1938), L. J. Harvey (1938), Isabel Mackenzie (1938), and Elma Roach (1938) among others. Max Meldrum joined Menzies' organisation but resigned before the Academy held its first exhibition, though kept showing in early annual exhibitions. Frederick William (Fred) Leist was a foundation member but soon resigned. Rayner Hoff had died before the inaugural exhibition, as had Paul Montford.

== Opposition ==
In the Victorian Artists Society autumn exhibition being opened at its quarters in East Melbourne on 27 April 1937 by Menzies, the Society's new president (and foundation member of the Academy) James Quinn, had included modernists whose works he had seen on his visits to their studios. When Menzies had finished his speech condemning modernity in painting as "doing all that great artists wouldn't have done," like making "a face look exactly like a cabbage, or a cabbage resemble a face," Quinn indignantly attacked Menzies, pointing out that Rembrandt himself was a rebel; "Instead of painting for buyers he painted to please himself as an artist and, accordingly, 'went broke'," he countered. The confrontation prompted letters from readers.

When the Academy's exclusion of modernist art from its officially sanctioned exhibitions became clear, opposition to the Academy was led by George Bell, a spokesman for 'modern art'. His argument with Menzies was very public, pursued through the newspapers, and in The Australian Quarterly. The avant-garde Angry Penguins' first three issues published in Adelaide also reflected these bitter tensions in what C.P. Snow regarded as "the last flowering of a 'national' modernism that a completely internationalised world of the arts was likely to see". In July 1938 Bell issued a leaflet, To Art Lovers, which led to the formation of the Contemporary Art Society, of which he became founding president, with painter and writer Adrian Lawlor as secretary, who produced a book, Arquebus (1937), and pamphlet, Eliminations (1939), detailing their opposition. Others who declared themselves against a conservative, outmoded 'Academy,' were Isabel May Tweddle and Norman Macgeorge, while Rupert Bunny, Sydney Long and William Lister Lister publicly refused Menzies' invitation to join, as secretary of the Twenty Melbourne Painters Society, A.M.E. Bale wrote to the Governor General protesting the formation of the Academy; and James Quinn was in conflict with Menzies over his open support for modern art.

In contrast to the Academy's venue for its first show, in Sydney's Education Department gallery, the first CAS exhibition was held at the National Gallery of Victoria in 1939, where it presented young artists including Sidney Nolan, Albert Tucker, Joy Hester, Russell Drysdale, William Dobell, James Gleeson, Eric Thake, Peter Purves Smith, Noel Counihan and new arrivals from Europe, Yosl Bergner and Danila Vassilieff. William Frater switched allegiances after the first Academy exhibition and showed with the CAS.

== Exhibitions of the Australian Art Academy ==
=== First exhibition ===
By the time of its first exhibition, held 8–29 April 1938 at the Education Department's Art Gallery, Loftus Street, Sydney, the catalogue lists more; Robert Henderson (Bob) Croll (Academy general secretary) William Frater, and John Rowell

The catalogue also names as Patrons; Rt. Hon. R. G. Menzies, P.C., M.P., Alexander Melrose, LL..B., G. R. Nicholas, J. R. McGregor, Charles Lloyd Jones, Hon. John Lane Mullins, Howard Hinton, O.B.E.; and its officers; the President Sir John Longstaff (who held the office until 1941); Vice-President Sydney Ure Smith, O.B.E., Exhibition Manager C. Parker, Secretary and Treasurer R. H. Croll, Assistant Secretary and Treasurer Vera Carruthers.

For this first exhibition, a Selection Committee was formed comprising Sir John Longstaff, W. B. McInnes, Harold Herbert, Lionel Lindsay, Sydney Ure Smith, Norman Carter, William Rowell, Thea Proctor, Margaret Preston, and Douglas Dundas.

Its Council had two 'divisions',' Northern, whose members were Norman Carter, Lionel Lindsay, Elioth Gruner, Thea. Proctor and Sydney Ure Smith; and Southern, whose officers were Harold Herbert, W. B. McInnes, Hans Heysen, Sir John Longstaff and William Rowell.

=== Second exhibition ===
The second annual Academy exhibition was held 5 April-3 May 1939 at the National Gallery of Victoria in Swanston Street, Melbourne. The exhibitors, several of whom were not Academy members, were from all states except Western Australia;

New South Wales artists represented by 4 works each were; Sydney Ure Smith O.B.E., Lloyd Rees, Adelaide E. Perry. With 3 works: Norman Carter, Grace Cossington-Smith, Elioth Gruner, Margaret Preston, Douglas Dundas, Adrian Feint. With 2 works: James. R. Jackson, Frank Medworth, Enid Cambridge, E. A. Harvey, Ralph D. Shelley, Maud Sherwood, Lionel Lindsay, Thea Proctor, Lyndon R. Dadswell. And with 1 work: Hector Gilliland, Sydney Long A.R.E., Freda Robertshaw, Will Ashton R.O.I., Nora Heysen, Gordon Esling, Norman Cartet, Harold Abbott, Eileen Vaughan, Unk White, G. T. Williamson, Dorothy Thornhill

Victorians with 4 works: H. Septimus Power, William Rowell, A. D. Colquhoun. With 3 works: Violet M. Mcinnes, John Rowell, James Quinn R.O.I.. R.P., Harley Griffiths Jr., Harry B. Harrison, Harold B. Herbert, Dora L. Wilson. With 2 works: Dorothy Whitehead, W. Beckwith McInnes, W. D. Knox, Wm. A. Dargie, A. E. Newbury, Polly Hurry, Amalie Colquhoun, Arnold Shore, Norah Gurdon, William Spence, John S. Loxton, Alfred Coleman, John W. Elischer, Orlando Dutton, Raymond Ewers, Stanley J. Hammond, W. Leslie Bowles, Geo. H. Allen, Ernest Buckmaster, Aileen Dent. And with 1 work: Alexander Colquhoun, Edward Heffernan, William Frater, John Farmer, Norman B. Cathcart, Ethel Wardle, Max Meldrum, Lance J. Sullivan, Charles Hills, W. Prater, Geo. H. Allen, Wallace Anderson

South Australians with 3 works: Hans Heysen. With 2 works: Ivor Hele, F. Millward Grey. And with 1 work: George Whinnen, Max Ragless, T. H. Bone, John C. Goodchild, Gwen Barringer

Queenslanders with 4 works: Vida Lahey. With 3 works: Kenneth Macqueen. With 2 works: Noel Wood. And with 1 work: L. J. Harvey

Tasmanians with 3 works: John R. Eldershaw. And with 1 work each: Joseph Connor, Ethel M. Nicholls

=== Third exhibition ===
The Academy's third exhibition was held, again at the Education Department gallery in Sydney, March–April 1940 during World War II. Arthur Murch, foundation member of Menzies' organisation, in his review in The Home which included an illustration of Roy de Maistre's 1938 quasi-cubist Football Match, reported that the "Exhibition demonstrates the changing face of Australian Art," and that there was evidence of a French influence, and picked out as "names to remember: Eric Wilson, Jean Bellette, Frank Medworth, Muriel Medworth, M. B. Paxton, Desiderius Orban, Alison Rehfisch, George Duncan, Arthur Fleischmann, Nora Heysen, Paul Haefliger, Alice Danciger," and the sculptures of Orlando Dutton and Lyndon Dadswell, asking of the latter "You would not like to live with his "Decorative Head”? No, nor vice-versa! but it could stand the competition of architectural surroundings or the irregularity of tree forms in open air. Does he see things like that? Certainly not. He has consciously produced a work in a decorative baroque manner."

The Bulletin declared that "The most original thing in the show is William Dobell's Red Lady, a fantastic and not at all beautiful composition. Examples of the “modern” style by Arnold Shore and essays in esoteric expressionism by Grace Cossington Smith, Roi de Maistre and M. B. Paxton demonstrate the Academy's beautiful tolerance." Writing in the magazine Pertinent, Frank Rhodes Farmer found the Academy show 'depressed' him, while being 'transported' by photography of the Miniature Camera Group at Blaxland Gallery, in which "appeared that same enthusiasm for life, for the new, fresh angle, as in Giotto, Chaucer, Shakespeare," asking; "Why then does the Australian Academy of Art lack this freshness, this new approach to life, this enthusiasm?"

=== Fourth exhibition ===
The Melbourne Athenaeum theatre was the venue for the fourth of the Academy's annual exhibitions, on which The Bulletin commented that of works inducing 'pleasant feelings,' only one belonged to a member of the A.A.A., but that "The true-blue three As. can't be said to have justified their claim to being a national institution. They are not Argonauts in search of the Golden Fleece, but more like a party on an ocean liner exchanging current gossip. The Old Guard weigh in with portraits in their accepted manner, and a disquietening feature is that the young portrait-painters, who are not A.A.As., appear to be trying to paint like the A.A.As."

=== Fifth exhibition ===
From 20–31 July 1943, the fifth annual exhibition of the Academy was held again at the Melbourne Athenaeum, was opened by Menzies, and featured war artists Adams, Dargie, Hele, Herbert, Hodgkinson, Murch and Norton. George Bell, reviewing it for the Melbourne Herald, remarked that "Although the catalogue says the show is restricted to the Southern Division, the walls are crowded — too crowded to show the pictures at their best. More stringent selection would have made a better show." While picking out paintings by Frater, Bryans, Ragless, Murch, Eldershaw, Watson, Whinnen, N. Heysen and Grant for favourable comment, Bell considered that "A number of well-known names are represented by works which, well enough painted though they be, call for no further comment than has been accorded many times. If the artist continually repeats himself there Is no reason why the critic should follow suit."

=== Sixth exhibition ===
Again limited to artists from the Academy's southern division as New South Wales and Queensland (the 'northern division') had decided not to exhibit for the duration of the war, the venue for the annual show held 11–22 July 1944 was again the Melbourne Athenaeum. It was opened by Governor Winston Dugan, and Academy member Harold Herbert reviewed it in The Argus and conceded that, among a majority of landscapes, "There is a leaven of semi-modern or contemporary work which is not altogether lacking in interest-an admission hard to wring from this stone-hearted reviewer!" Recent acquisitions of works by Australian official war artists in Australia, the Pacific, and abroad lent by the board of management of the Australian War Memorial. Herbert, also a war artist, considered that "the quality of some of the work, as painting, is open to question. They are vivid records, at all events."

=== Seventh exhibition ===
The Seventh annual exhibition was held at the Athenaeum from 31 July – 11 August 1945 and again opened by the Governor of Victoria. At the hieight of the Pacific War it received little media attention. Clive Turnbull's article in the Herald was headed 'Art Exhibition Is Not Outstanding,' with praise only for "a blood transfusion from a few non-members," and reacts to the 'remarkable' catalogue statement that; "Recognition by the Federal Government of the Academy as the principal representative art body in Australia has been evidenced by an invitation to advise the Government on the appointment of war artists, on additions and alterations to be made to the War Memorial at Canberra, and on other cultural matters." "If this is so," he then asks, "it is an extraordinary and reactionary decision which ought to be annulled. An admirable advisory committee. however, could be made from artists who are not members of the Academy, according to its published list. It would include Rupert Bunny and George Bell in Melbourne and William Dobell and Russell Drysdale in Sydney. If the Academy has indeed been set up as a quasi-official advisory body it would be interesting to know what Minister made the decision, and why."

=== Eighth exhibition ===
Alan McCulloch welcomed the "smaller—and therefore better hung" eighth annual exhibition of the Australian Academy of Art, on 23 July 1946, and once again at the Athenaeum Gallery, Collins Street, Melbourne. Conductor Eugene Goossens officiated and encouraged attendees to purchase works "to lake them home for refreshment of the soul." Only seven Academy members showed; Quinn, Power, Ragless, Rowell, Buckmaster, Dora Wilson, and Violet Mcinnes. McCulloch's review in The Argus concluded that;

...the business-like competence of academy members is considerably helped by some of the more modest, perhaps more inspired, invitees. Lina Bryan's rolling forms and lively colours attract attention. "Afternoon, Frankston," by Alan Moore, is a quietly poetic and charming work, and three small works two low-toned lyrical pastels, and a head study in pencil by David Eager, are quietly impressive. "Burke Road Bridge," by Annois, is outstanding in the water-colour section."

Herald critic Clive Turnbull commented; "As now seems to be usual, outsiders show the best work — Charles Bush with two Koepang scenes, Alan Moore with a little beach scene, Lorna [sic] Bryans with a landscape. William Frater, strangely met in this company, livens up the ranks of the academics with a portrait and a couple of other works."

The Academy's eighth annual exhibition was not its very last; in November that year a private viewing in Melbourne was arranged during the visit of the then Governor-General Prince Henry, Duke of Gloucester and the Duchess, herself an artist. From it, a loan of fifteen Academy works was hung at Government House, Yarralumla, in Canberra. The paintings the Vice-Royal couple selected were one by William Dargie, four by Will Rowell, three by Alfred Coleman, two by Violet McInnes and two by C. Dudley Wood, and others by W.B. McInnes, Ernest Buckmaster, and Gwen Barringer.

Also that year the Australian Government commissioned three Australian artists, Academy member Colin Colahan, and war artists Stella Bowen and Lt. G. R. Mainwaring, to paint views of the Victory Parade for the Australian War Memorial Board.

== Legacy ==
The controversy and confrontations between the modernist and antimodernist forces spilled into politics, as Herbert Vere (Doc) Evatt, largely at the prompting of his wife Mary, sole female trustee of the AGNSW, championed the modernists during his leadership (1951–1960) of the Labor opposition to Robert Menzies' Liberal Party.

The Melbourne-based Fellowship of Australian Artists, also conservative, emerged in 1950 in response to the Academy’s demise.

As Sarah Scott argues, even after the collapse of the Academy, Menzies' views continued to impact Australia's modernist artists in his second term as prime minister from 1949. The 'conservative old guard' of which Menzies was a part continued its influence due to the government's monopoly in selection of works for official overseas exhibitions.

Twenty years after disputes over the Academy, the conflict erupted again over which art should be Australia's first official representation at the 1958 Venice Biennale; the Commonwealth Arts Advisory Board sent outdated examples of the Heidelberg School and a few Arthur Boyd landscapes (and not the more radical Brides series he was then painting). A consequence of the ensuing critical rejection was that Australia refused an invitation to exhibit at the 1960 biennale and did not show in Venice again until 1978; the country was thus absent from the world's showcase of international art for twenty years. The ramifications for the nation's artists, and the cultural presentation of the nation through art, were profound, and deep divisions emerged between nationalist values represented by the heritage of the Heidelberg school versus the internationalism of those aligned with European modernism.

== Gallery of works by founding members of the Academy 1930s-1940s in chronological order ==
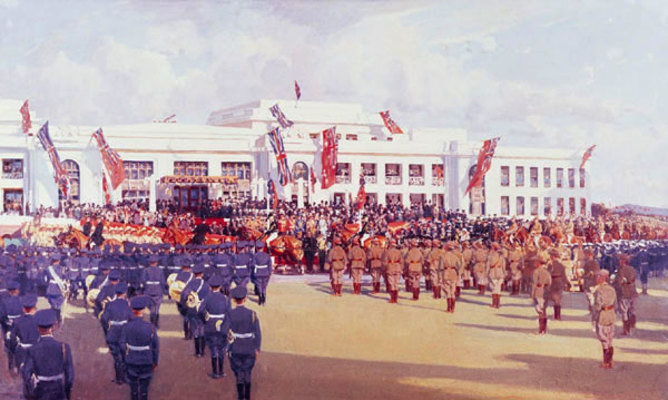
Harold Septimus Power (1927) Opening of Federal Parliament House Building, Canberra, 9 May 1927. Oil on canvas. Historic Memorials Collection

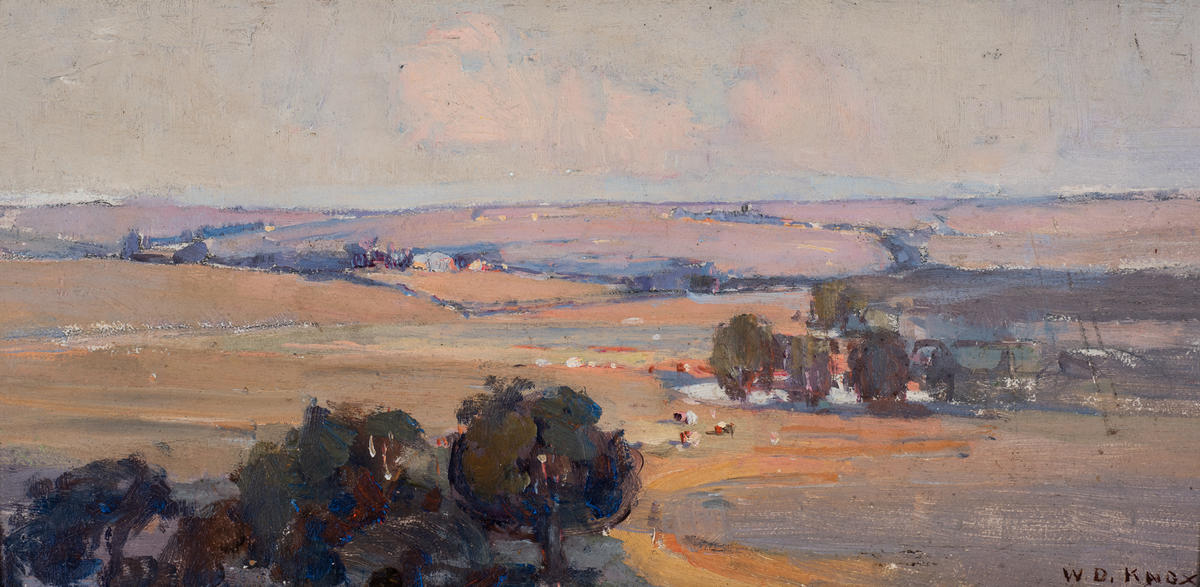
William Dunn Knox (1928) Landscape Bacchus Marsh, Oil on board, 19.0 x 38.5 cm. Castlemaine Art Museum

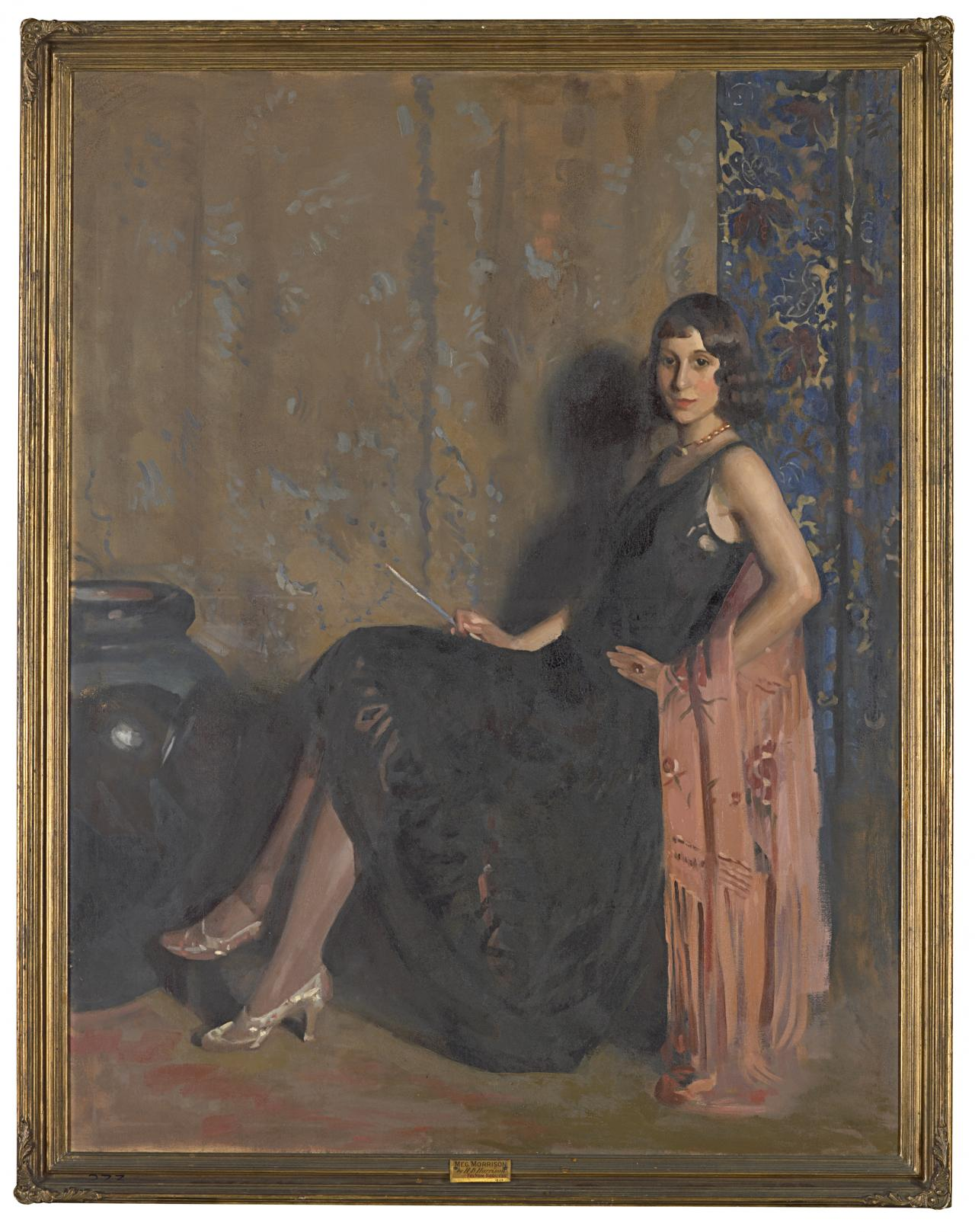
Harry B. Harrison (c. 1929) Meg Morrison, oil on canvas, 160.0 × 122.8 cm. National Gallery of Victoria, Melbourne

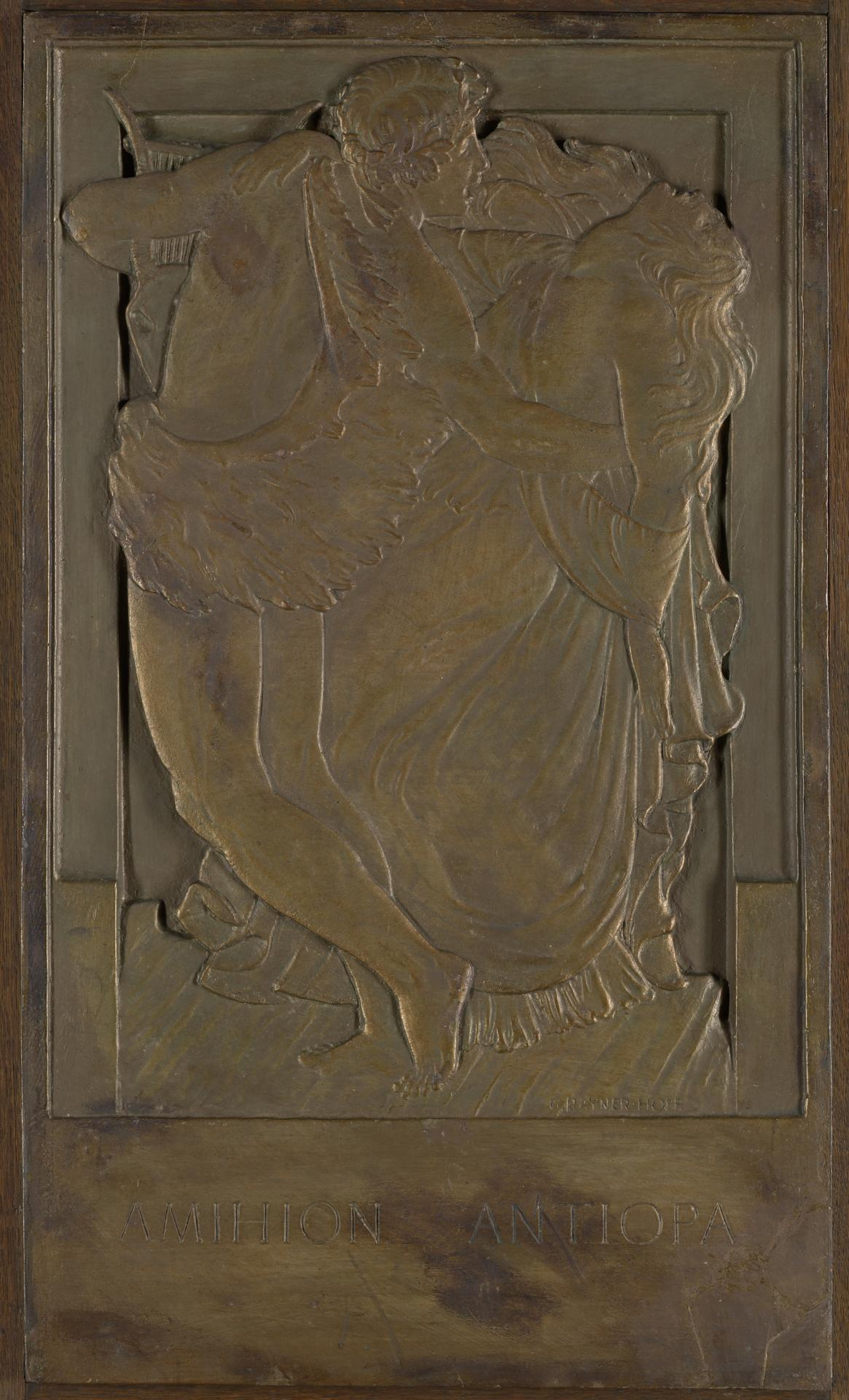
Rayner Hoff (1932) Amphion and Antiope, plaster, bronze paint 63.5 × 37.4 × 2.3 cm. National Gallery of Victoria

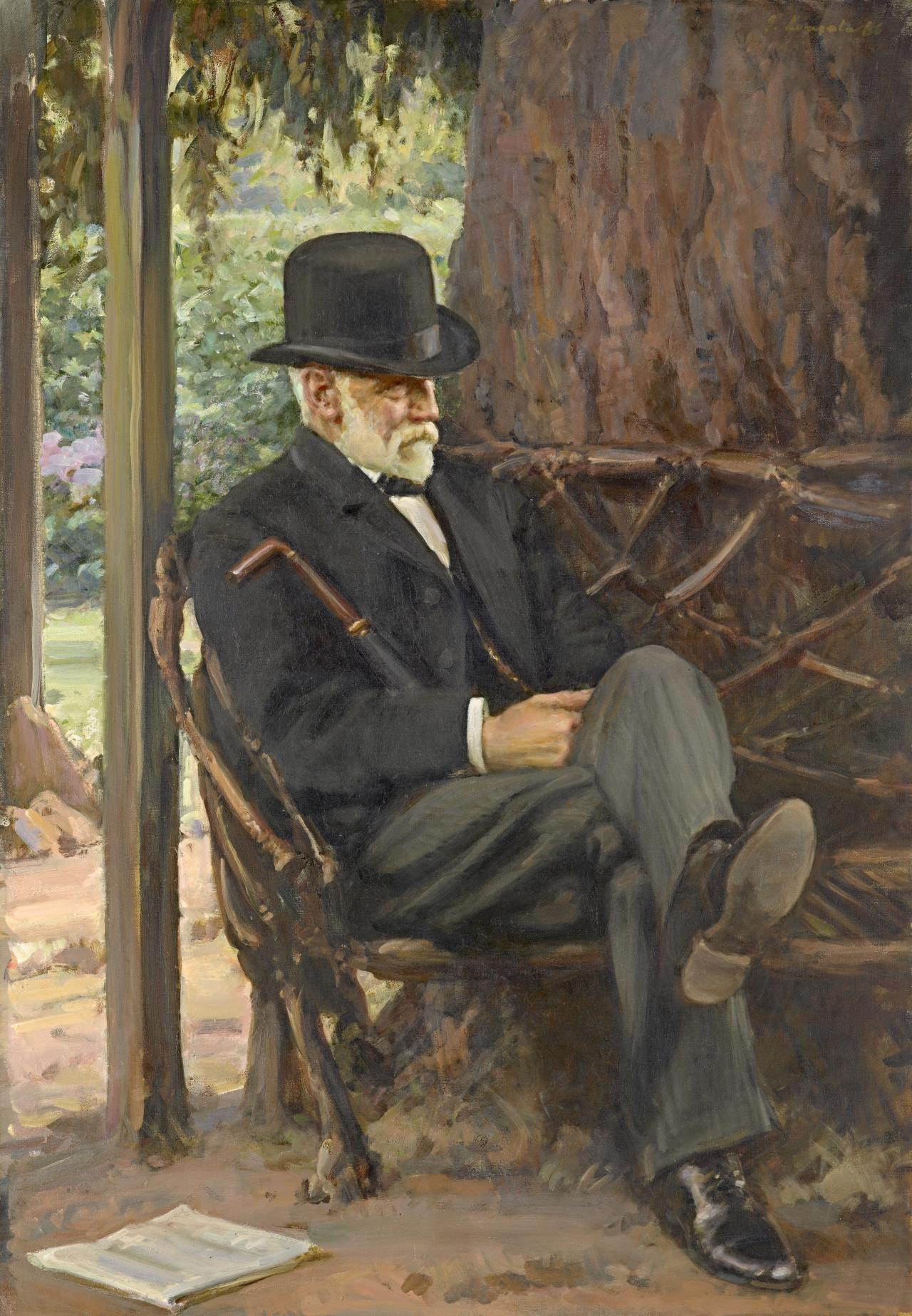
John Longstaff (c. 1932) Alfred Felton, oil on canvas, 139.4 × 95.9 cm. National Gallery of Victoria, Melbourne

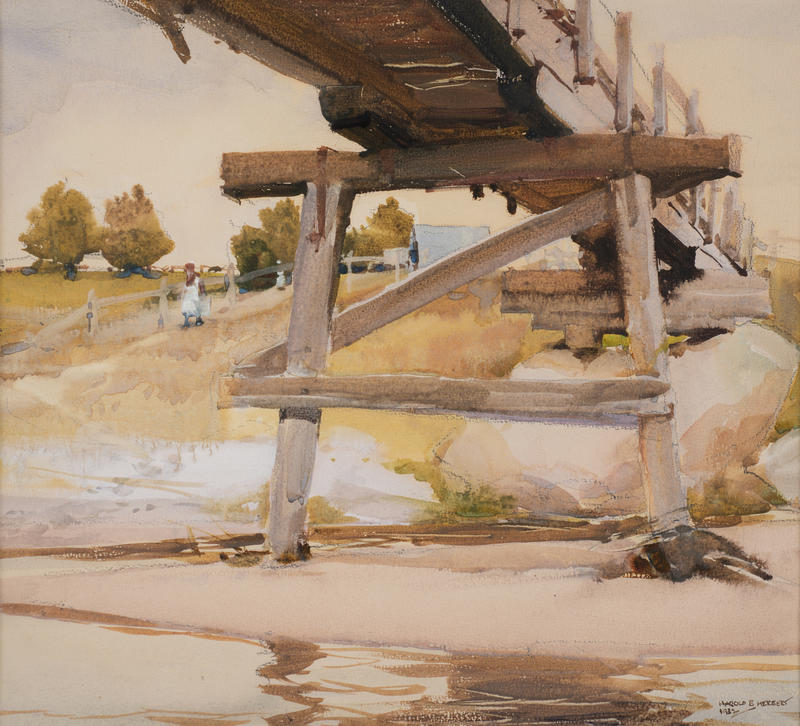
Harold Herbert (1932) A Relic, watercolour, 37.0 x 41.3 cm. Castlemaine Art Museum

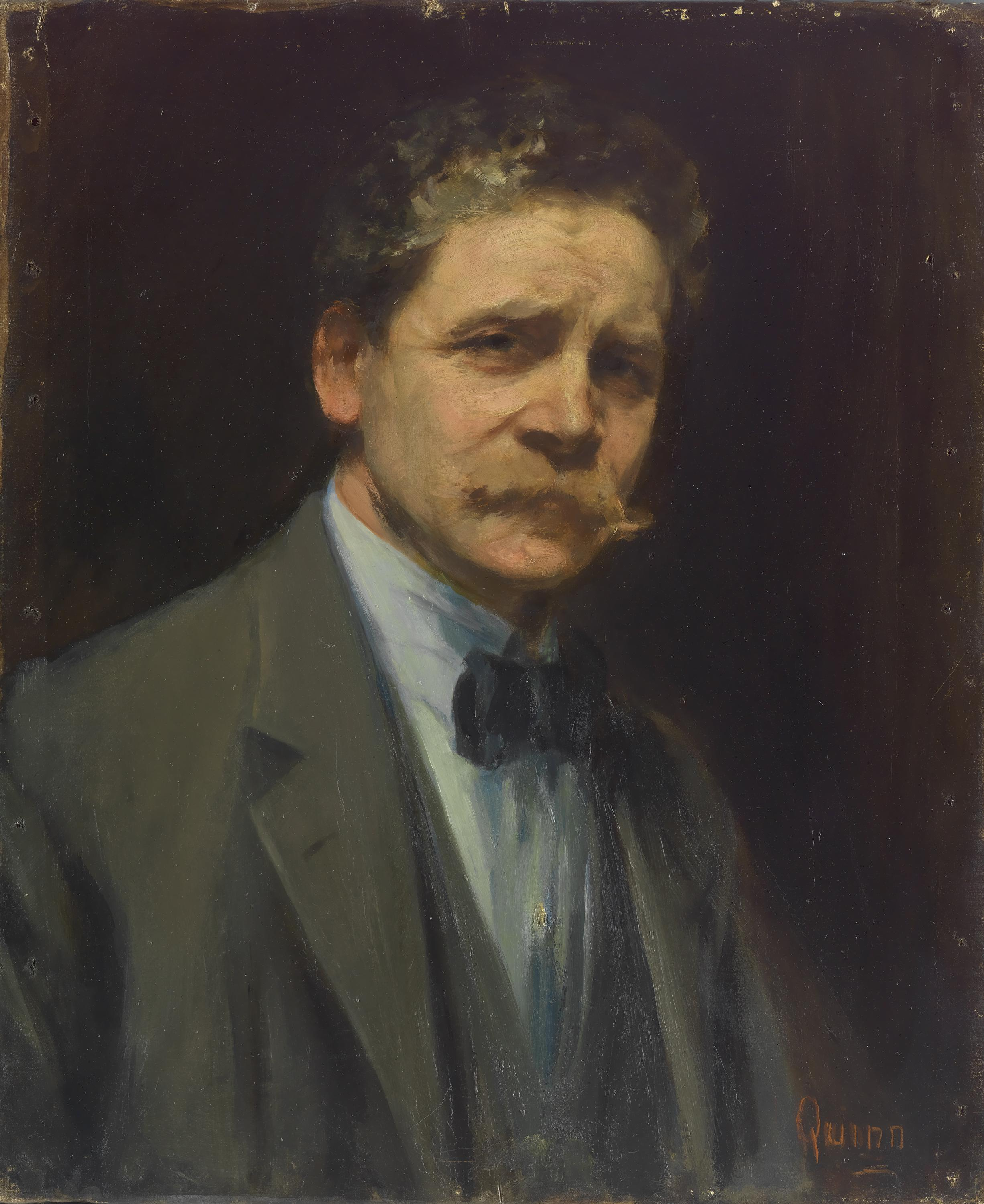
James Quinn (1932) Self portrait, oil on canvas, 61.6 × 51.5 cm. National Gallery of Victoria, Melbourne

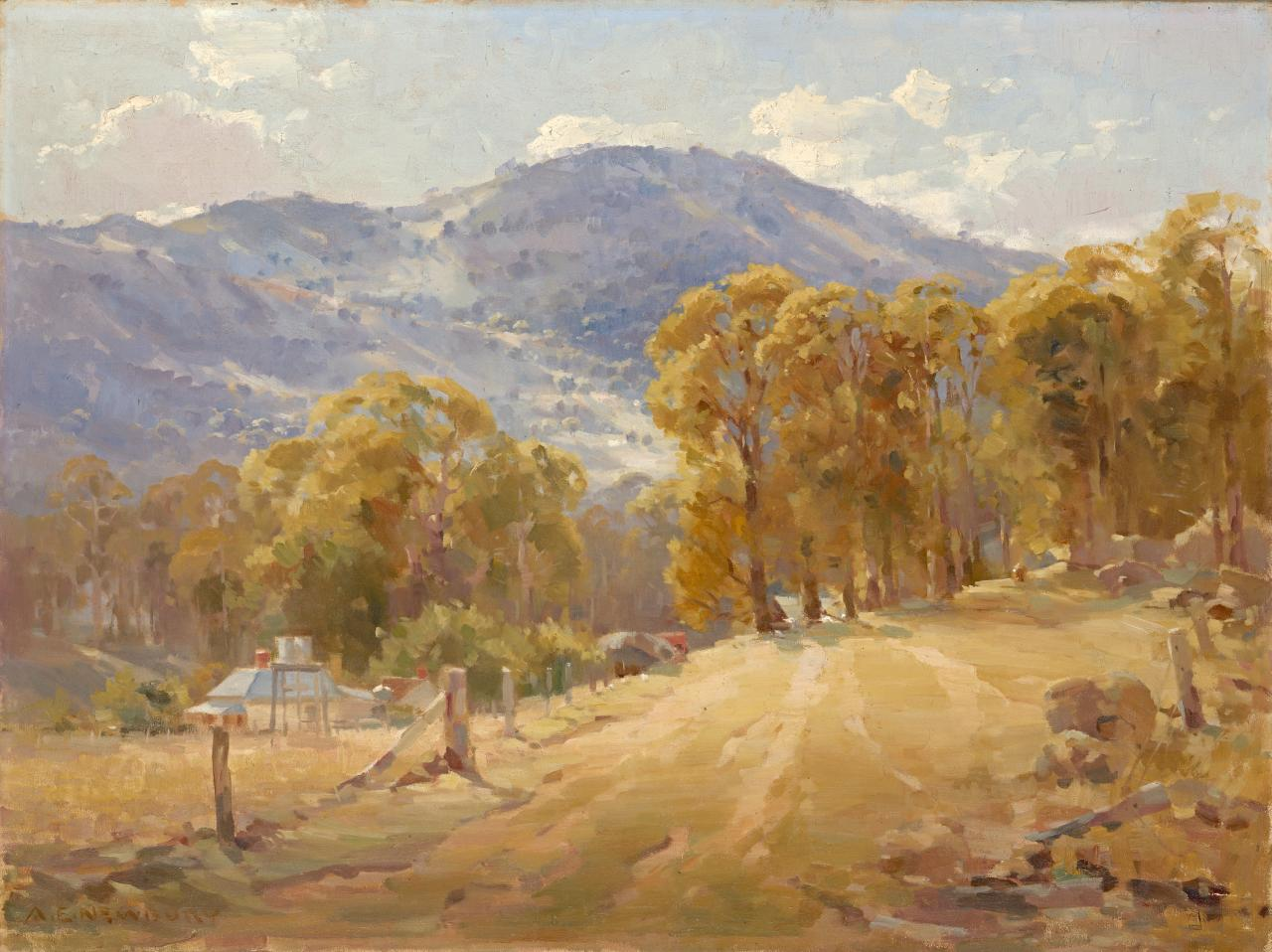
Albert Ernest Newbury (c.1934) The heart of the ranges, oil on canvas, 76.4 × 102.0 cm. National Gallery of Victoria, Melbourne

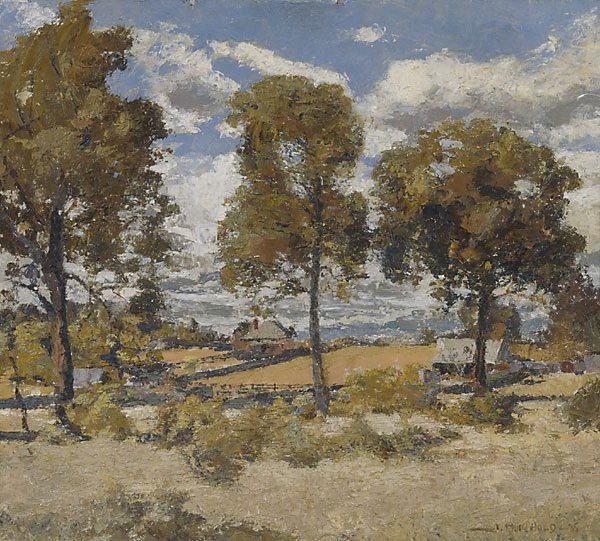
James Muir Auld (1935) Winter Morning, oil on canvas, AGNSW

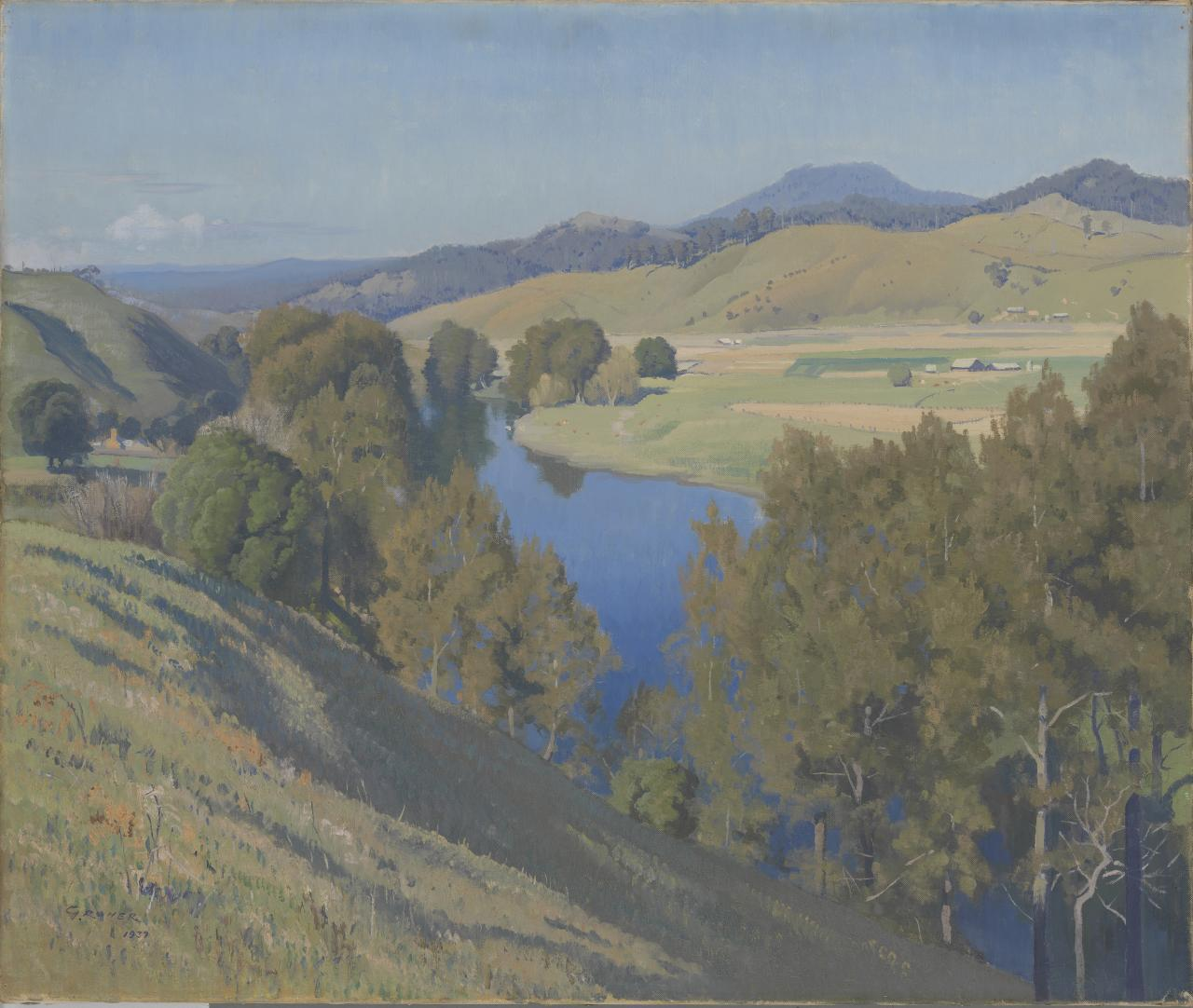
Elioth Gruner (1937) Bellinger pastoral, oil on canvas, 64.0 × 76.2 cm. National Gallery of Victoria

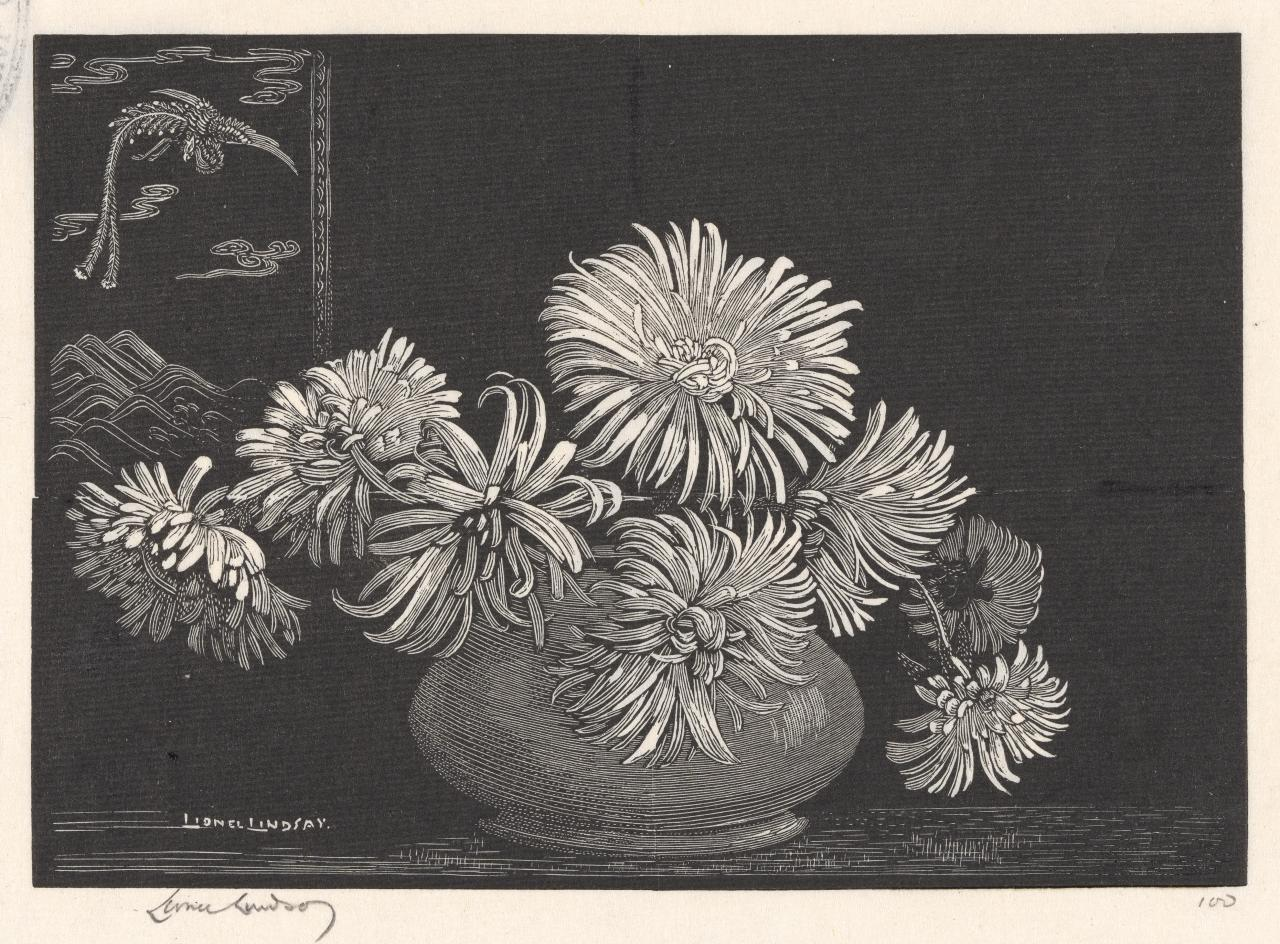
Lionel Lindsay (1937) Asters, wood engraving, 10.2 × 14.5 cm (block). National Gallery of Victoria

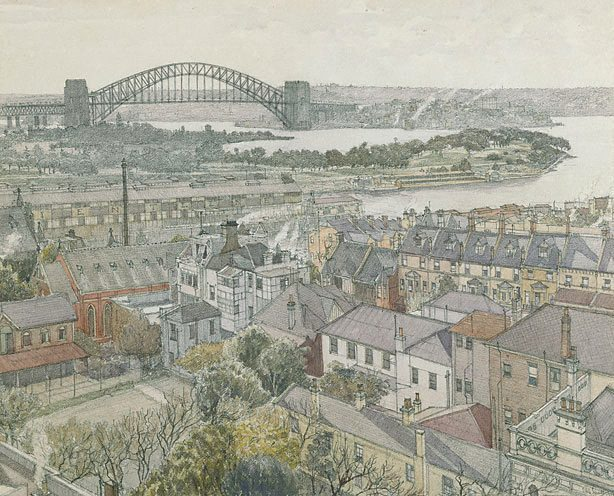
Sydney Ure Smith (1937) Harbour Bridge from Potts Point, pencil, watercolour on ivory wove paper 46.5 x 57.5 cm Art Gallery of New South Wales

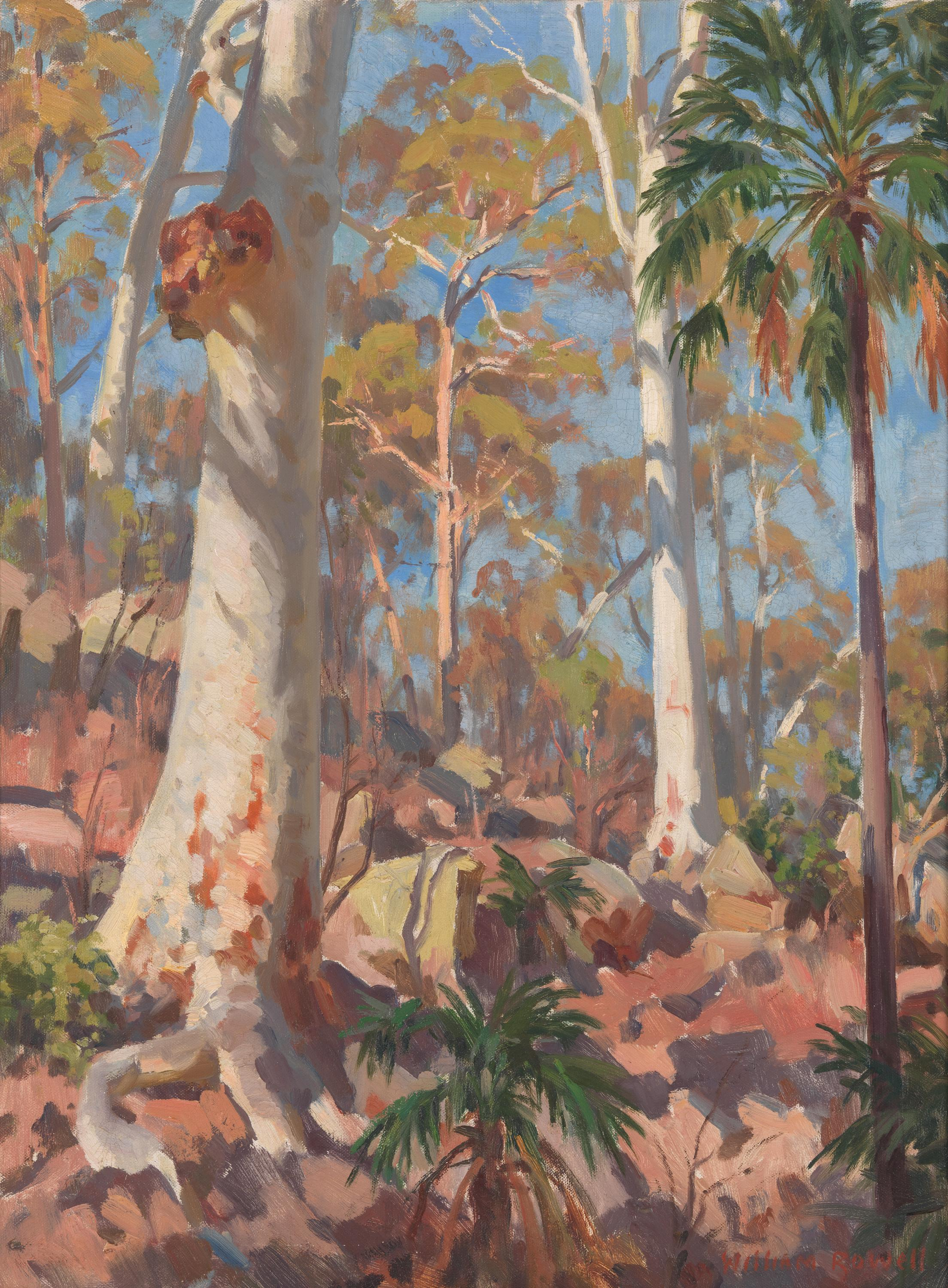
William Rowell (1938) Bush landscape, oil on composition board, 61.7 × 46.5 cm. National Gallery of Victoria

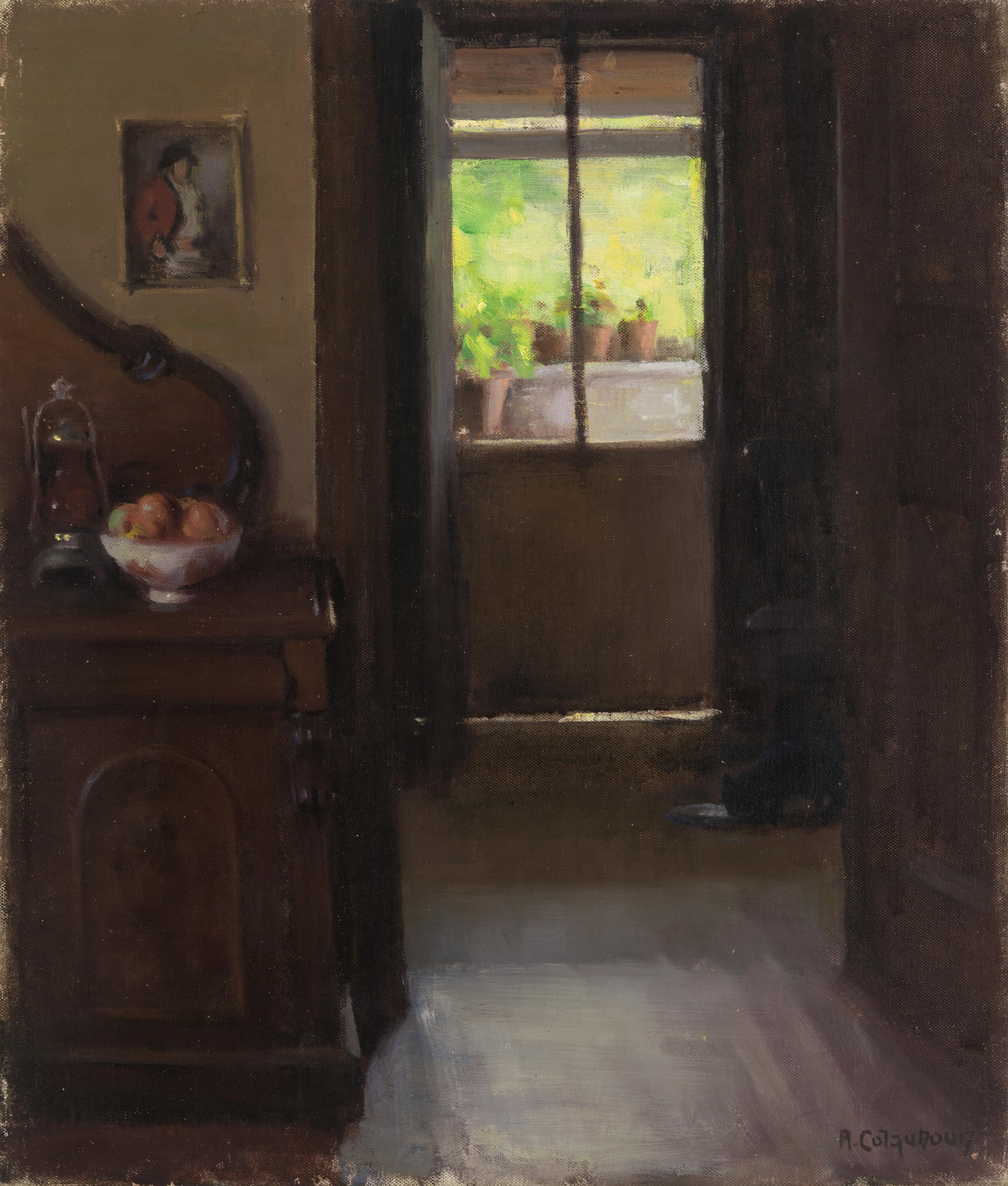
Alexander Colquhoun (c.1938) Interior, oil on canvas on composition board, 45.4 × 38.5 cm. National Gallery of Victoria, Melbourne.

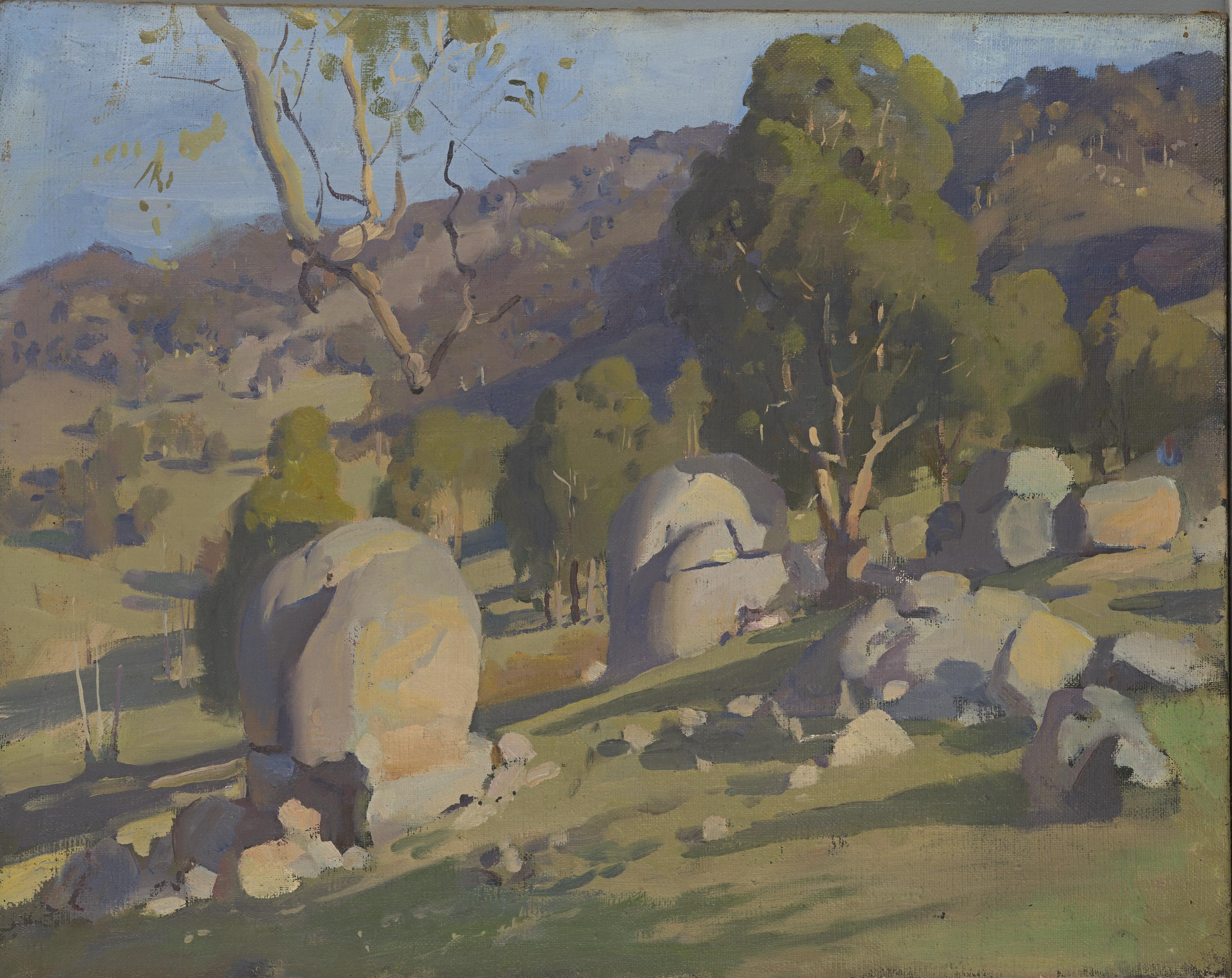
William Beckwith McInnes (n.d. c.1940) Near Marysville, oil on canvas, 48.9 × 61.4 cm. National Gallery of Victoria, Melbourne

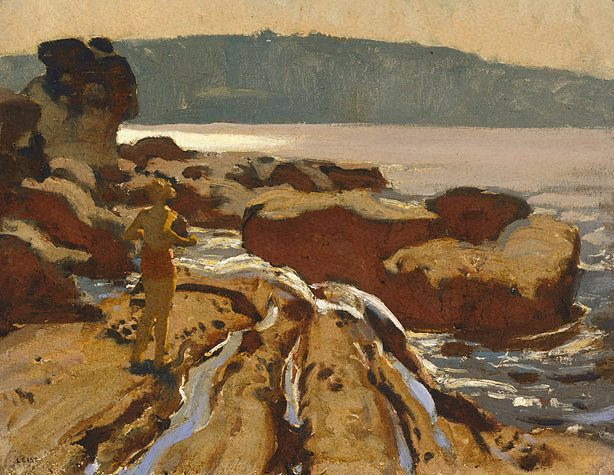
Fred Leist (1940s) Falling tide, oil on canvas on paperboard, 36.0 x 45.6 cm. AGNSW

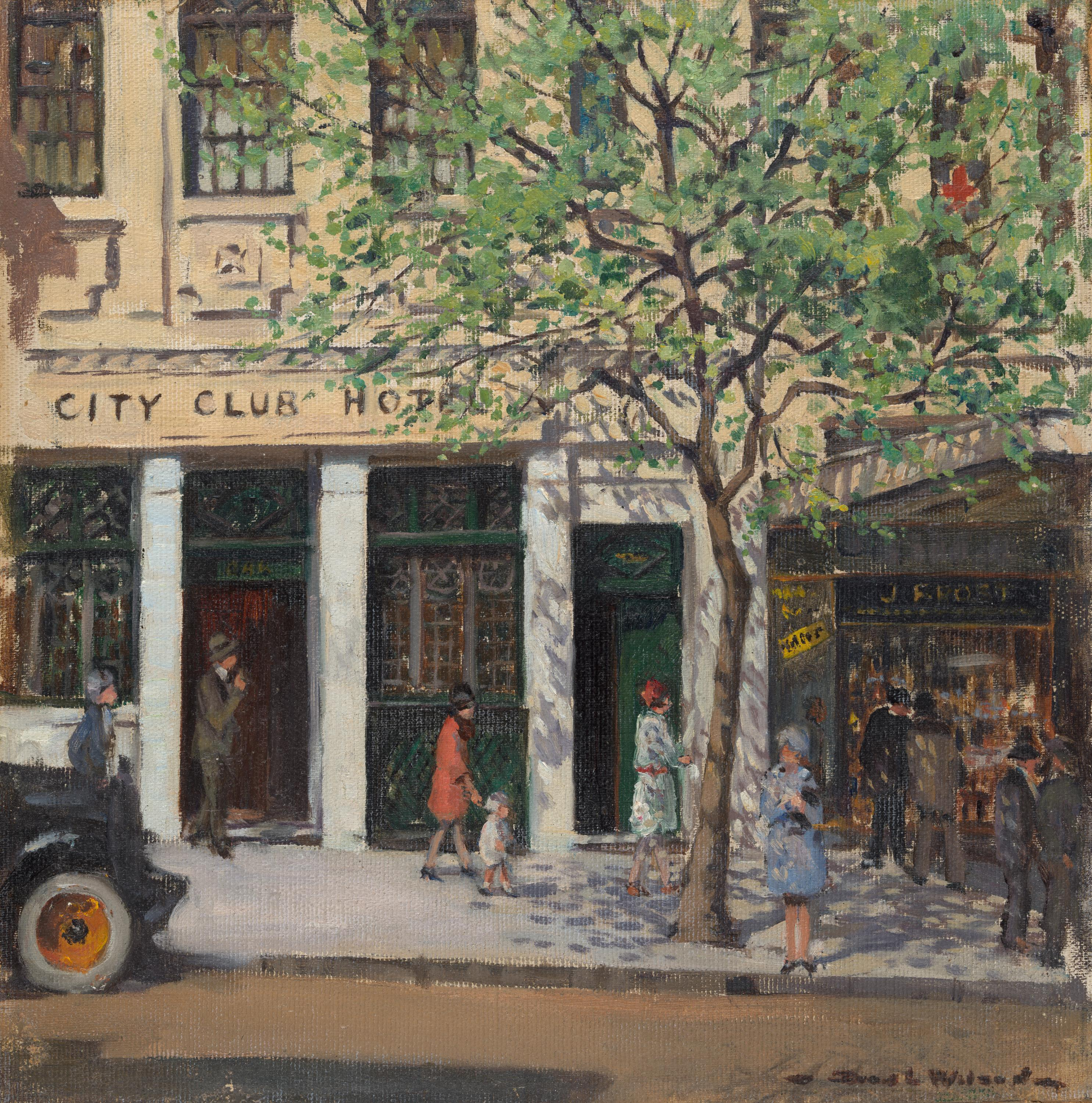
Dora Wilson (1940s) Paris end of Collins Street, oil on canvas, 34.2 × 34.2 cm. National Gallery of Victoria

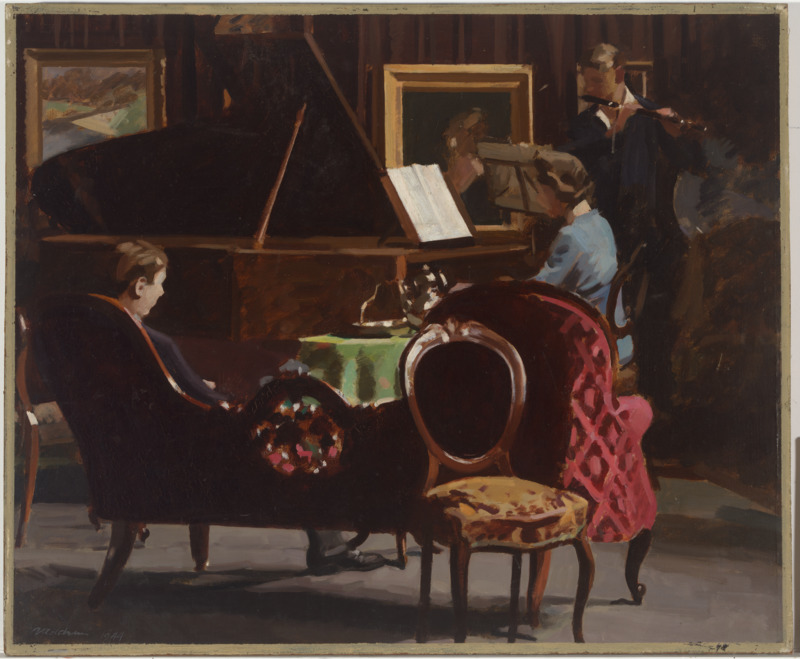
Max Meldrum (1944) Rehearsal, oil on canvas on composition board, 86.5 h x 104.5 w cm. National Gallery of Australia
