= Jean Appleton =

Australian painter (1911–2003)

- Born: 13 September 1911; Ashfield, New South Wales, Australia
- Died: 11 June 2003 (aged 91); Bowral, New South Wales, Australia
- Education: East Sydney Technical College; Westminster School of Art
- Occupations: Painter, Art teacher, Printmaking
- Spouses: Eric Wilson (m. 1943; died 1946) Tom Green (m. 1952; died 1981)
- Children: 1

Jean Appleton (13 September 1911 – 11 June 2003) was an Australian painter, art teacher and printmaker. She worked with oils, watercolour, charcoal, pastel, pencil and India ink. The second of three children and an only daughter, Appleton did a five-year diploma course in drawing and illustration at the East Sydney Technical College (now the National Art School).

She later moved to England and enrolled at the Westminster School of Art where she produced Australia's two earliest cubist paintings. After the Second World War broke out, Appleton returned to Australia in 1940, to teach art at three public schools to allow for the continuation of her work and assisted in the war effort by studying vocational therapy. Her work received a large amount of recognition from the art industry, and she earned four prizes.

== Biography ==
=== Early life and education ===
Appleton was born in the Sydney suburb of Ashfield on 13 September 1911. She was the second of three children and the only daughter of Charles Appleton and Elizabeth Appleton (née Macredie). Her father encouraged her to read books, and her elder brother Frederick instilled a sense of adventure into her. Appleton had a lifelong interest in the performing due to her great-aunt Agnes Blackwood. She was educated at the small Haberfield Private School, and was disciplined for drawing in her study books; she wanted to become an artist during her childhood. After she earned an intermediate certificate with an A in arts in 1928, Appleton enrolled at the East Sydney Technical College (now the National Art School) to commence a five-year diploma course in art. Appleton's parents supported her career choice; she believed her father had not taken her ambitions in art seriously for fear she would be married and find art as a hobby.

=== Career ===
She remembered her first teachers and the atmosphere as uninspiring, and ventured to the Archibald Prize exhibition to attempt to arouse her interest, with no success. The arrival of the English painter Douglas Dundas in 1930 greatly influenced her. Appleton graduated with a diploma in drawing and illustration in 1933 and earned a college scholarship. After she observed impressionist prints lying in an Anthony Hordern & Sons department store, she became preoccupied about venturing to Europe and studying modern art to which her father objected. Appleton shared and worked in a studio in Quay with fellow painter Dorothy Thornhill, and earned capital by creating textile patterns. She made multiple unsuccessful attempts to obtain the New South Wales Government Travelling Scholarship. After her father died in 1935 her mother was persuaded by Appleton's aunt to allow her daughter to travel to England by cargo ship with a minor income allowance.

Appleton found affordable accommodation and enrolled at the Westminster School of Art's morning and evening classes over the next three years from 1936. She was educated by the painters Bernard Meninsky and Mark Gertler. Appleton completed Australia's two earliest cubist paintings in London, Still Life 1937 and Painting IX 1937. She was part of a team of Australian artists (William Dobell, Donald Friend, Arthur Murch and Eric Wilson) that produced a 45 m (148 ft) mural and a gilded ram to erect it for the International Wool Secretariat at Glasgow's British Empire Exhibition in 1938. The impending Second World War caused Appleton's mother to become anxious and wanted her daughter to return to Australia. She went to the Centenary Cézanne Exhibition, galleries in Luxembourg, and art in Italy before doing so.-

In that era, teaching was a venture that allowed artists to continue working; Appleton taught at the Canberra Girls Grammar School in 1940 and had her maiden solo exhibition at the Macquarie Galleries in Sydney that same year. She became interested in the war effort and did a course in vocational therapy because its director wanted volunteers to assist her. Appleton was granted a full-time position until 1945. She moved to teaching at the Julian Ashton Art School to assume Wilson's former teaching position in 1946 before switching to the East Sydney Technical College the following year. The money Appleton accumulated allowed her to construct and purchase a house in Pymble. She had a second venture to Europe in 1951 and went to the studio of Paul Cézanne to renew interest in the formal structure of her work.

Appleton's work received much recognition from the art industry; she won the Rockdale Art Prize in 1958, the D'Arcy Morris Memorial Prize two years later, the Bathurst Art Prize in 1961 and the Portia Geach Memorial Award in 1965. Her family spent time back in England during the 1960 before residing in Australia due to alienation of the decade's art styles. Appleton was represented on the Print Council of Australia Exhibition in 1968 after she had become interested in printmaking before ceasing the activity in 1980.

She visited her daughter in Dharamshala, North India the following year and befriended several Tibetan refugees. Appleton exhibited with the Jim Alexander Gallery, Melbourne in 1985. She underwent a cataract operation in 1991 and created a large mural-size painting after her sight was corrected. A retrospective of her work was held at the Campbelltown City Bicentennial Art Gallery five years later. In 1998 the writers Christine France and Caroline Simpson produced an essay on Appleton called Jean Appleton: A Lifetime with Art. After an exhibition of her work to the conclusion of the Second World War at the Sturt Gallery in Mittagong in 2000, Appleton died in hospital in Bowral on 11 June 2003.

== Personal life and personality ==
Appleton was married two times. In 1943, she married the painter Eric Wilson. He died from bladder cancer in 1946. Six years later, Appleton married the painter Tom Green after they had met on her trip to Europe in 1951. They have one daughter, Elisabeth Green von Krusenstiena, who would become a Buddhist nun in Canberra. Green died from cancer in 1981.

She was described as an individual who was admired professionally; according to the painter Elizabeth Cummings, Appleton was not didactic and had an interest in exploration to enough of an extent that her "thinking was always moving." The interviewer Willi Carney calls her "self-reliant" and an "assured yet modest lady who deserves to be recognised as one of our most significant living artists."

== Analysis ==
Appleton preferred to work with oils and watercolour; she also exhibited works in charcoal, pastel, pencil and India ink. Describing painting as "a very personal thing" with "a poetry in painting" and "a love affair", one of her favourite subjects concerned bottles. In 1942, Appleton went away from rounded geometric forms that she learnt during her time in London to an increasingly decorative and schematic cubist style and experienced with a lighter colour scheme.

== Exhibitions ==
- Solo exhibition, The Macquarie Galleries, Sydney, 1940
- Solo exhibition, The Macquarie Galleries, Sydney, 1949
- Solo exhibition, The Macquarie Galleries, Sydney, 1960
- Solo exhibition, The Macquarie Galleries, Sydney, 1967
- Solo exhibition, Raffin Galleries, Orange, 1968
- Solo exhibition, Goodwood Gallery, Adelaide, 1976
- Solo exhibition, The Macquarie Galleries, Sydney, 1977
- Solo exhibition, The Macquarie Galleries, Sydney, 1978
- Solo exhibition, Greenhill Galleries, Adelaide, 1981
- Solo exhibition, Greenhill Galleries, Perth, 1982
- Solo exhibition, The Painters Gallery, Sydney 1983
- Solo exhibition, Jim Alexander Gallery, Melbourne, 1985
- Solo exhibition, The Painters Gallery, Sydney, 1986
- Solo exhibition, The Painters Gallery, Sydney, 1988
- Solo exhibition, Greenhill Galleries, Adelaide, Previewed at Robyn Brady Ltd, Sydney, 1989
- Solo exhibition, Robyn Brady Ltd at Caspian Galleries, Sydney, 1993
- Solo exhibition, Harper's Mansion, Berrima, 1994
- Solo Exhibition, Robyn Brady Ltd at home, Moss Vale, 1995
- Solo Exhibition, "Paintings 1945 - 1995", Campbelltown City Bicentennial Art Gallery, 1996

=== Selected Group Exhibitions ===
- Dangerously Modern: Australian Women Artists in Europe 1890–1940, Art Gallery of South Australia, Adelaide, 2025

== Awards ==
- East Sydney Technical College Scholarship, 1928
- Rockdale Art Prize, 1958
- D'Arcy Morris Prize for Religious Painting, 1960
- Bathurst Art Prize, 1961
- Portia Geach Memorial Award, 1965
- Orange Festival Art Prize, 1977
- Manly Art Prize, 1977
