= Adelaide Perry =

Australian artist (1891–1973)

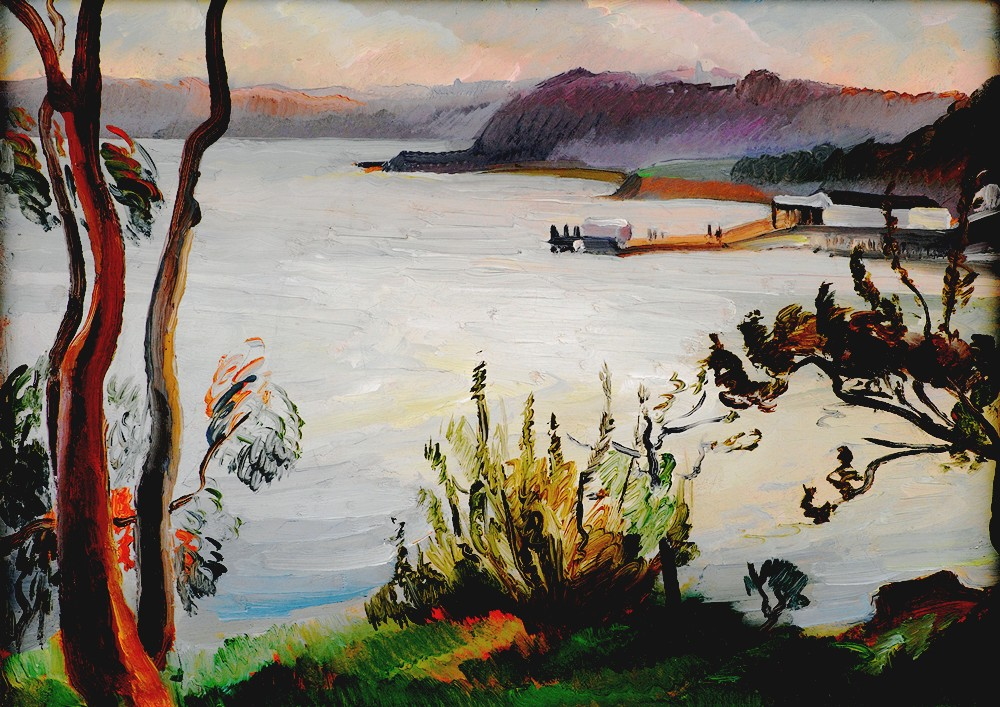
- Taronga Wharf, 1939
- Born: Adelaide Elizabeth Perry; 23 June 1891; Beechworth, Victoria
- Died: 1973 (aged 81–82); Killara, New South Wales
- Known for: Artist, printmaker and teacher

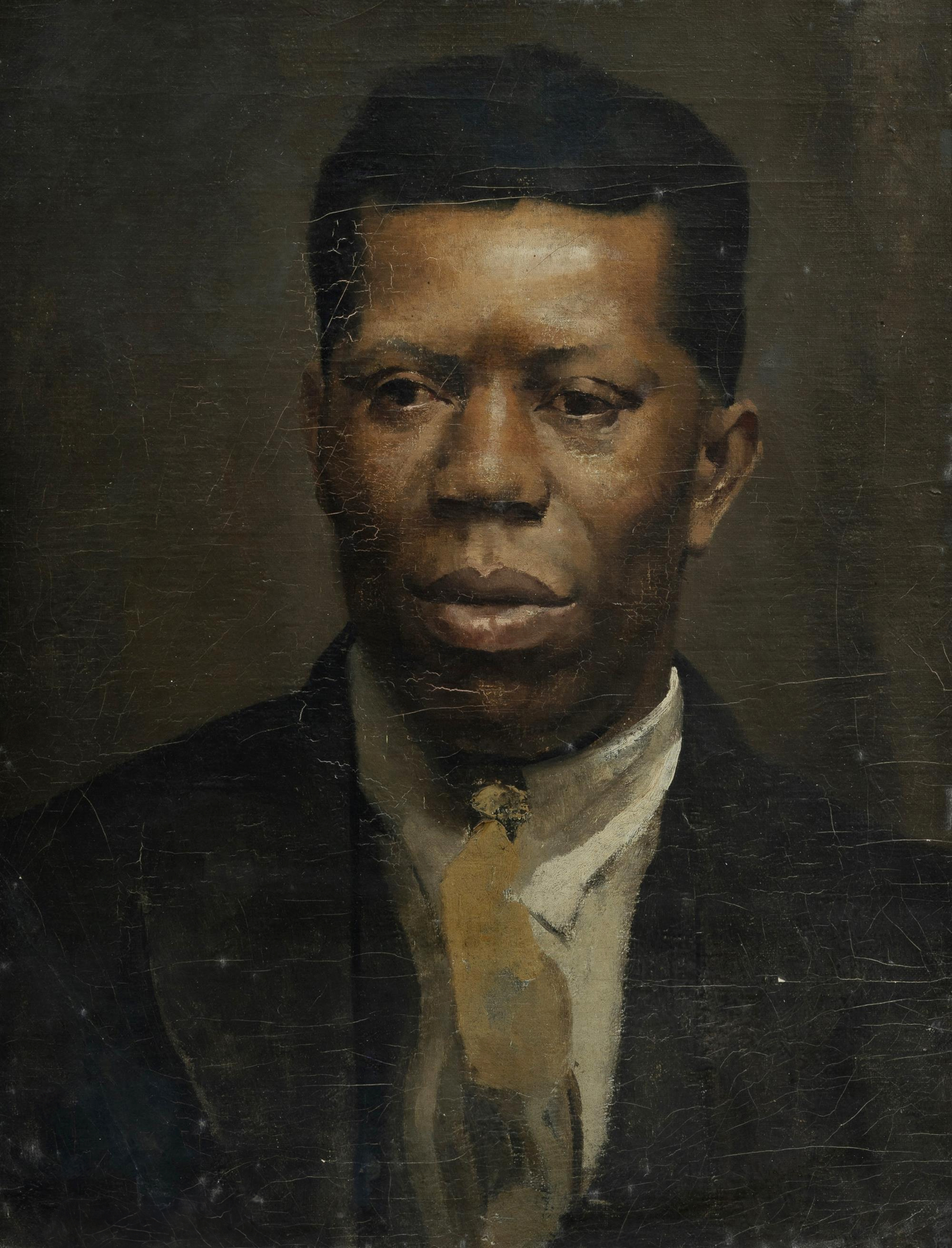
Portrait study of a Black man, completed in 1923 while Perry was a student at the Royal Academy.

Adelaide Perry (1891–1973) was an influential Australian artist, printmaker, and respected art teacher. Based in Sydney, she started her own art school. Perry actively exhibited her paintings and prints from 1925 to 1955 and is partly credited with introducing and promoting the new relief print technique using linoleum in the 1920s.

== Biography ==
Perry (1891–1973) was born in Beechworth, Victoria. Her parents were Richard Hall Perry, solicitor, and Eliza Elizabeth (née Reardon). After her father's death in 1896, her mother remarried and the family moved to New Zealand.

Perry returned to Melbourne in 1914 to attend the National Gallery of Victoria Art School where she was a student of Bernard Hall and Frederick McCubbin.

In 1921, Perry was awarded the National Gallery of Victoria Travelling Scholarship and spent four years in London at the Royal Academy. In London she met and was influenced by Charles Sims, Gerald Kelly and Ernest Jackson who she credited with teaching her "all she knew about art". She also exhibited in Paris at the Salon des Artistes Francais, returning to Australia in 1925.

Perry started using the recently invented linoleum to create relief prints in the mid-1920s. Wooden blocks were not easy to cut and required a printing press. She was enthusiastic about the medium and used it in her work and taught classes. She was attracted by the distinctive black lines and simplified forms which appealed to her interest in modernism. She used the method in her many depictions of the coastal environment and the harbour. Along with Thea Proctor and Margaret Preston, she can be credited with promoting linocuts.

Some of her best landscape work was undertaken at Austinmer NSW when she was periodically lent the holiday house of her art dealer John Young (see the last external link).

As early as 1930, Perry was commended as a 'clever artist' by The Bulletin magazine for her portraits of poet Mary Gilmore and art critic and co-owner of the Macquarie Galleries Basil Burdett, which she had submitted to the annual Society of Artists exhibition. It was noted she was on the staff of the Julian Ashton Art School and was a member of the Society of Artists.

In the early 1930s, Perry established the Adelaide Perry School of Drawing and Painting at 12 Bridge Street, Sydney. She was teaching part-time at the Presbyterian Ladies' College, Croydon after being recommended by Roy de Maitre and was exhibiting at the Macquarie Galleries.

In 1934 Perry exhibited "portraits of quality" alongside leading women artists of the decade in an exhibition of the Melbourne Society of Women Painters.

In 1936 Perry acquired the lease to a penthouse in Lower Pitt Street, Sydney and stylishly converted the space into a teaching studio as well as her own accommodation.

In 1937 Perry became a foundation member of, and exhibited with, Robert Menzies' anti-modernist organisation, the Australian Academy of Art. and in 1940 at their Third Annual Exhibition, her portrait of "Diana" was appreciated by the artist and sometime art critic Arthur Murch as having a "subtle quality". He also commented on the changing face of Australian art mentioning young artists who had returned from overseas such as Jean Bellette, as well as established artists in Australia such as W A Dargie, Margaret Preston, Eric Wilson, and Roy de Maistre.

In the war years, Perry found opportunities to exhibit with a wide range of artists with established reputations at the Macquarie Galleries including Julian Ashton, Donald Friend, William Dobell, Roland Wakelin, Lloyd Rees, Thea Proctor, and Arthur Fleischmann. In 1944, Perry she showed her drawings at the Macquarie Galleries alongside Thea Proctor, Daryl Lindsay, Arthur Murch, James Cook and Douglas Dundas.

After the war, Perry started teaching art full-time at Presbyterian Ladies' College, and stayed there until she retired in 1962.

Perry continued to participate in the conservative Society of Artists annual exhibitions. In 1954, Elizabeth Young, a writer for the Adelaide Advertiser, made the observation that there was an "unusually comprehensive cross-section of art" and that "young artists" were exhibiting "boisterous canvases" influenced by expressionist and abstract painters of the European School. However, there were more established artists such as Arthur Murch, Lloyd Rees, Margaret Preston, Roy Wakelin and Perry who "had come up with quiet, sober and considered work that still had punch in it".

In 1955 she again exhibited with the Society of Artists with John Passmore, Nora Heyson, and Lloyd Rees. From this time there is little evidence that Perry created much in the way of new work. However, she had made her mark as a printmaker and painter, and in future years her work would be included in a few important survey exhibitions.

In 1984, Perry's oil paintings were included in the exhibition Private Collection:The Post-Impressionist Mood in Australian Painting held at the Nolan Gallery, Lanyon, ACT.

In 1986, Perry's linocuts were included in the exhibition Australian Printmakers: 1773–1986 at the National Gallery of Australia.

In a 1995 art review of the "extensive" and "comprehensive" exhibition of the works by Adelaide Perry and her students, Overlooked But Not Forgotten, at the Drill Hall Gallery at the Australian National University, Sasha Grishin, of the Canberra Times stated that although Perry had never been "a major figure in the Australian art scene", it is possible Perry's career may have been affected by the Depression and held back by the need to have an income. Grishin does identify her early work, the simple relief prints, "as using the medium to its full potential" and they compared favourably to her contemporaries such as Margaret Preston, Thea Proctor, Ethel Spowers and Vera Blackburn, the latter whom she taught at her Sydney art school. Grishin sums up Perry as having had "a significant impact on the Sydney art scene".

== Recognition ==
1995: The retrospective exhibition Overlooked But Not Forgotten, works by Adelaide Perry and her students, was held at the Drill Hall Gallery, Australian National University.

2001: Adelaide Perry Gallery established by Presbyterian Ladies' College, Croydon, NSW to "broaden students’ experience and knowledge of art, design and curatorial practice".

2006: Adelaide Perry Drawing Prize was established.
