= Prince Philip, Duke of Edinburgh (William Dargie portrait) =

1956 painting of Prince Philip

- Artist: William Dargie
- Year: 1956
- Type: Portrait painting
- Medium: Oil on canvas
- Subject: Prince Philip, Duke of Edinburgh
- Owner: City of Melbourne Art and Heritage Collection

Prince Philip, Duke of Edinburgh is an Australian portrait of Prince Philip, consort to Elizabeth II who reigned as Queen of Australia from 1952 to 2022. It was painted in 1956 by Sir William Dargie, two years after he completed the official Australian portrait of Elizabeth, known as Wattle Queen.

== Description ==
The portrait shows Philip in uniform with his left-hand thumb resting in his blazer pocket and, thus, is noted for giving off a mix of formal and casual appearance. Dargie painted the Duke in oil on canvas. The family of Melbourne industrialist James P. Beveridge, who had commissioned the Wattle Queen portrait of Elizabeth II, donated this portrait of Philip to the City of Melbourne. The donation happened around the time of the 1956 Summer Olympics in Melbourne, which was declared open by Philip.

Another similar portrait of Philip by Dargie, which has been described as "a draft or copy of the City of Melbourne portrait", is part of the collection of Melbourne Legacy, a charitable organisation whose collection is part of the broader Victorian Collections.
