= Norman Lloyd (artist) =

Australian landscape painter

Norman Lloyd (16 October 1895 – 5 March 1983) was an Australian landscape painter.

== Early life and education ==
Norman Lloyd was born in 1895 near Newcastle, New South Wales, where he attended primary school. He left school in 1911 and started to work and study painting with Julian Ashton and James R. Jackson in Sydney.

On his 21st birthday in 1916 he enlisted with the Australian Imperial Forces and was transported to Europe where he was seriously wounded in battle a year later. After returning to Sydney in February 1918, he took up painting lessons at the Julian Ashton Art School again. From 1921 to 1926, Lloyd exhibited with galleries in Sydney and Melbourne, showing landscapes and Sydney harbour scenes painted in the more traditional style of his teachers.

== Career ==
From 1926 to 1929, Norman Lloyd visited Europe and travelled widely in Italy and France, exhibiting in the UK, France and Australia, culminating in a solo exhibition at Macquarie Galleries in Sydney.

In the 1930s, Lloyd migrated to London with his wife Edith for good, setting up a boarding house in upmarket St Johns Wood and establishing himself quickly in the new society, being a kind, generous and interested man with a broad horizon. His mansion became a meeting point and home for many Australian expats, among them painters Will Ashton, Alison Rehfisch and George Duncan. The Lloyds hosted pianist Nancy Weir, and war correspondent Harold Fyffe was a close friend, who introduced Lloyd to H. G. Wells and George Bernard Shaw.

Lloyd established himself also professionally, when he was elected member of the exclusive Royal Institute of Oil Painters (ROI) in 1936 and of the London Sketch Club, over which he presided during 1941 to 1942.

He also kept his connection with Australia by becoming a Fellow of the Royal Art Society of New South Wales, and in 1949 Henry Hanke's portrait of Norman Lloyd was chosen to be hung in the Archibald Prize of the Art Gallery of New South Wales.

From 1933 until 1970, Lloyd exhibited regularly with the ROI, and showed at the Royal Academy of London. The titles testify of Lloyd's love for mediterranean Europe – Italy, Spain, France, Turkey and Morocco, inspiring joyful land, sea and mountainscapes, in a style that evoked impressionism. Lloyd was a prolific painter who was able to paint fast, preferring textural oil and pastels.

From 1947 onwards, Lloyd spent the summers with Zénaide Chaumette – whom he had met in Paris after the war – in the heart of France in Chassignoles. This liaison strengthened his connection with France and probably led to his exhibiting at several Salons of the Société des Artistes Français from 1947 until 1962, and also at the Salon d’Hiver in Paris.

== Death and legacy ==
After the death of Zénaide Chaumette in 1954, Lloyd was willed Chaumette's house in Chassignolles until he died, and it seems that he moved to Chassignolles permanently in 1974, at the age of 80 after the death of his wife, Edith. He was later found wandering in a confused state in Paris unable to speak, having had a stroke. Fortunately he was able to communicate that he had friends in Chassignolles which led to the involvement of a nephew in England. The nephew was contacted and arrangements made for him to live in a nursing home in Yorkshire where he died on 5 March 1983. The 'Times' of London printed a short obituary.

In 1989, 1990, Lloyd's work was shown at Savill Galleries in Sydney alongside a number of important Australian artists. In 1990 Christopher Day Gallery, Sydney, dedicated a solo exhibition to Norman Lloyd, and 1991 saw his work again at a group exhibition in Deutscher Fine Art, Melbourne.

Lloyd's work is now represented in the Art Gallery of Western Australia, the Queensland Art Gallery, the University of Sydney Art Collection and numerous private collections in Australia, Europe and US.

== Curriculum vitae ==
- 1895 16 October, born in Hamilton near Newcastle, NSW, Education at Hamilton School
- 1911 Leaves home. Various manual jobs. Studies with James R. Jackson and Julian Ashton
- 1916 Enlists in the Australian Imperial Force on his 21st birthday. Serves as Private in the 19th Battalion
- 1916 Embarks on 11 November on the HMAT Suevic in Sydney
- 1917 20 September, seriously wounded at Polygon Wood
- 1918 14 February, returns to Sydney on HMAT Runic
- 1918 14 May, discharged from Forces for medical reasons
- 1918 Studies painting again with Julian Ashton at the Julian Ashton Academy in Sydney
- 1921 Exhibition of oil paintings of Sydney Harbour at Decoration Galleries, Melbourne
- 1922 Exhibition at Fine Art Galleries, Melbourne
- 1924 Exhibition at Anthony Hordern with the Younger Group of Australian Artists
- 1925 Second Exhibition at Anthony Hordern with the Younger Group of Australian Artists
- 1925? Returns to Europe to study and travel
- 1926 Exhibition at Macquarie Galleries, Sydney in June. Exhibition at Dunster Galleries, Sydney
- 1926–1929 Travels in Europe and England. Lloyd exhibits works at the Royal Academy, the Paris Salon, the Liverpool and Glasgow galleries. Receives an invitation to show at the International Society's Gallery at Pittsburgh, Pennsylvania
- 1929 Exhibition of selected works at the Paris Salon, Société des Artistes Français "Views of Australia"
- 1929 Solo Exhibitions at Macquarie Galleries, Sydney. Fine Art Society's Gallery, Melbourne
- 1930–1974 Lives in London, St John's Wood, at 66 Avenue Road, then 61 Marlborough Place and later on 63 Marlborough Place
- 1931 Exhibition at Leger's Gallery, Old Bond Street, London
- 1932 Exhibits works with the Royal Institute of Oil painters, London
- 1933 Exhibition at Leger's Gallery, Old Bond Street, London
- 1933 Exhibits works with the Royal Institute of Oil painters, London (ROI)
- 1933 Exhibits paintings at the Royal Academy, London
- 1934 Listed in 'Who's Who in Art – 1934'
- 1934 Exhibits works with the ROI, London
- 1935 Exhibits works with the ROI, London
- 1936 Member of the ROI
- 1936 Exhibits works with the ROI, London
- 1937 Exhibits works with the ROI, London
- 1938 Listed with the Royal Institute of Oil Painters and as Fellow of the Royal Society of Artists (FRSA)
- 1938 Exhibits works at the Royal Academy, London
- 1938 Exhibits works with the ROI, London
- 1939 Exhibits works with the ROI, London
- 1940 Exhibits works with the ROI, London
- 1941–1942 President of the London Sketch Club
- 1940 Royal Academy of Arts, United Artists' Exhibition
- 1944 Liaison officer in Paris after the liberation of France, meets Zenaïde Chaumette
- 1944–1974 Regular visits to Chassignolles
- 1947 Exhibits works with the ROI, London
- 1947 Exhibits works at Le Salon, Société des Artistes Français
- 1948 Exhibits works with the ROI, London
- 1949 Exhibits works with the ROI, London
- 1949 Exhibits works at Le Salon, Société des Artistes Français
- 1949 Exhibits at Salon d’Hiver
- 1950 Exhibits works with the ROI, London
- 1950 Exhibits works at Le Salon, Société des Artistes Français
- 1951 Exhibits works with the ROI, London
- 1951 Exhibits works at Le Salon, Société des Artistes Français
- 1951 Exhibits at Salon d’Hiver
- 1952 Exhibits works at Le Salon, Société des Artistes Français
- 1953 Exhibits works at Le Salon, Société des Artistes Français
- 1953 Exhibits works with the ROI, London
- 1954 Exhibits works at Le Salon, Société des Artistes Français
- 1954 Exhibits works with the ROI, London
- 1955 Exhibits works at Le Salon, Société des Artistes Français
- 1956 Exhibits works with the ROI, London
- 1962 Exhibits works at Le Salon, Société des Artistes Français
- 1963 Exhibits works with the ROI, London
- 1964 Michael Kmit exhibition, Melbourne
- 1964 Exhibits works with the ROI, London
- 1965 Exhibits works with the ROI, London
- 1966 Exhibits works with the ROI, London
- 1970 Exhibits works with the ROI, London
- 1974 Exhibits works at Stewart's of London and Donegal
- 1974–1976 The ROI lists Normans Lloyd's address as Chassignolles, 36/400 Indre, France
- 1975 Exhibition at Davids-Bartlow Gallery, Columbus, Ohio
- 1976 Exhibition at Davids-Bartlow Gallery, Columbus, Ohio
- 1978 Exhibits at Koch Galleries, Mobile, Alabama
- 1983 5 March, dies in Keighley, Yorkshire
