= Alfred Coleman =

Alfred Coleman may refer to:

- Alfred Coleman (cricketer)
- Alfred Coleman (artist)
