= Edmund Arthur Harvey =

Australian artist

- Born: 20 February 1907; Newcastle upon Tyne, England
- Died: 23 May 1994 (aged 87)
- Resting place: Sydney
- Education: Julian Ashton Art School, Académie Julian
- Known for: Painting

Edmund Arthur Harvey, also known as E.A. Harvey or Harvey (20 February 1907 – 23 May 1994) was an Australian artist. Known for his portraits and landscape art, he also taught painting, most notably at the National Art School in Sydney. In a career spanning 67 years, Harvey's works were shown in numerous exhibitions, and are included, among others, in the collections of the Art Gallery of New South Wales and the Tasmanian Museum and Art Gallery.

== Early years ==
Edmund Arthur Harvey was born in Newcastle-upon-Tyne, United Kingdom, on 20 February 1907, son of Arthur James Harvey and Margaret Harvey née Nicholson. His only sibling, younger brother Wilfred, died in infancy. Harvey migrated with his parents to Australia in 1909, but was sent back to Europe for studies at the age of eighteen. His parents returned to England for the duration of World War I, as his father was an engineer and worked in Southampton in a naval wartime position. They returned to Australia in about 1918, after the war.

== Education and career ==
Harvey began his art studies in 1922 at the age of fifteen years, at evening classes in drawing under Henry Gibbons at East Sydney Technical College (ESTC) in Sydney. That same year he commenced full-time art studies with Julian Ashton at the Sydney Art School. In 1925, at the age of eighteen, he was sent to Paris, where he became a full-time student at the Académie Julian, and also took evening classes at Académie Colarossi de la Grande Chaumière. In 1926 he studied in Florence, the Academia Della Bella Arte in Rome, and at the Chelsea Polytechnic in London.

In 1927 Harvey returned to Sydney. From 1927 to 1928 he was assistant to George Washington Thomas Lambert, ARA. In 1930 he attended evening classes at East Sydney Technical College (ESTC). Harvey was elected a member of the Society of Artists in 1932. In 1933 he assisted Norman Carter in preparing cartoons for stained-glass windows called Sheep Country, and two murals for the former Rural Bank building in Martin Place, Sydney; the building was later demolished, but the murals were removed by the conservation staff of the Art Gallery of NSW. When Edmund Harvey held his first exhibition in Melbourne in 1934, Arthur Streeton hailed him as 'a clever young painter from Sydney.' Harvey had made his debut at the Macquarie Galleries only the year before.

Harvey developed a successful private practice. His landscape paintings were traditional in style, and mainly depicted scenes in rural New South Wales. Although Harvey was better known for his landscapes, he also executed numerous still life studies throughout his career. His 1944 oil painting on hardboard Flower piece is part of the Art Gallery of New South Wales collection. He signed his paintings 'HARVEY’.

In 1935 Harvey and Arthur Murch founded the School of Decorative Arts, situated at the corner of Liverpool and Castlereagh Streets, Sydney.

Harvey became a part-time art teacher at ESTC in 1935, and became a full-time art teacher in the NSW Department of Technical Education on 2 September 1940. He was an art teacher (part-time 1936–1940, full-time 1940–1971) at North Sydney Technical College and ESTC (which became the National Art School). He became Head of the North Sydney Technical College annexe of East Sydney Technical College, and Senior Head Teacher. In 1972 Harvey was Senior Head Teacher of Diploma Painting, Fine Arts Division, at the National Art School. He retired at the end of 1971, after thirty-seven years teaching at the National Art School, and continued to paint in private practice until his death.

== Personal life ==
In 1940 he married one of his students, Lorna Dummer (1919–2013), in Sydney. They had one son, Antony James, and one daughter, Diana.

In World War II, Harvey served in the Australian Army (22 April 1942 – 21 April 1944) in the Volunteer Defence Corps as a Gunner. In 1945, the Harveys moved to the Sydney suburb of Castlecrag, where they lived until his death on 23 May 1994.

He was a close, lifelong friend of Australian artist and Archibald Prize winner Arthur Murch.
