= Alison Rehfisch =

Australian artist (1900–1975)

Alison Baily Rehfisch (23 January 1900 – 12 March 1975) was an Australian painter born in Sydney.

== Early life ==
Alison Rehfisch was born as Alison Baily Green on 23 January 1900 in Woollahra, Sydney, and grew up in Mosman. Her mother, who was a proficient sculptor, painter and musician, encouraged her interest in painting and drawing. As a student at Redlands School, Cremorne from 1913–15, she was influenced by the painter Albert Collins.

Upon leaving school, she studied at the Julian Ashton Art School before marrying in 1919 and as Alison Rehfisch studied around 1925 under Antonio Dattilo Rubbo at the Royal Art Society. It was here she met George Duncan and they began sharing studio space.

== Career ==
She began exhibiting at the Blaxland Gallery in 1929 and it was around this time that she and her husband split up and she moved into a studio apartment with Dorrit Black, Rah Fizelle, Thea Proctor and Adelaide Perry. She left for London in 1933, where she studied, worked and travelled, including a 3-month stay in Spain. After hearing of her husband's death in 1938, she returned to Sydney and in 1942 married George Duncan.

In 1947, their home burnt down and Alison lost several hundred paintings. Friends arranged an auction at the home of Desiderius Orban. She and George moved to the country and took to painting landscapes around Berrima, Moss Vale and Goulburn but returned to Sydney in 1953 when George secured a position as director of David Jones Art Gallery. They bought a house "Hillgrove" in Pymble which she decorated extensively, but spent little time on more mundane tasks. She was active with the Contemporary Art Society and the Contemporary Group. She continued to paint her still lifes and landscapes but concentrated more on flower paintings, which lowered her reputation as a serious painter.

== Death ==
After George died of cancer in 1974, she was inconsolable and less than a year later, with deteriorating eyesight and suffering depression, committed suicide by swallowing poison.

== In Collections ==
Her works may be found in the following collections: the National Gallery of Australia (2 prints), the Cruthers Collection of Women's Art at the Lawrence Wilson Art Gallery at the University of Western Australia, in the Art Gallery of New South Wales, and the National Portrait Gallery of Australia.

== Exhibitions ==
She held exhibitions at Blaxland Gallery in 1933 and Macquarie Galleries in 1933, 1939, 1946, 1949 and 1958

A joint retrospective of George's and Alison's work was held at Macquarie Galleries in 1976.

== Awards ==
- 1929: Royal Art Society Prize for Still Life
