= Wattle Queen =

1954 painting of Queen Elizabeth II

- Artist: William Dargie
- Year: 1954
- Type: Portrait painting
- Medium: Oil on canvas
- Subject: Elizabeth II, Queen of Australia
- Location: Parliament House, Canberra
- Owner: Historical Memorials Committee

Her Majesty Queen Elizabeth II, commonly known as Wattle Queen or the Wattle Painting, is the official Australian portrait of Elizabeth II, who reigned as Queen of Australia from 1952 to 2022. Painted in 1954 by Sir William Dargie, the portrait became one of the most recognisable and best-known examples of 20th century Australian portraiture.

== Background ==
In December 1954, William Dargie was commissioned by Melbourne industrialist James P. Beveridge to paint Australia's official portrait of Queen Elizabeth II, who posed for him at Buckingham Palace. There were five sittings at Buckingham Palace in 1954, with Dargie staying with Sir Neil and Lady Hamilton Fairley near Grosvenor Square for two months.

Dargie painted the Queen in oil on canvas using a glowing green-gold colour scheme, enlivened by white flashes of her jewellery.

In an interview, Dargie remembered painting at Buckingham Palace: "Four sittings which turned out to be seven – of two hours each. I was absolutely terrified at first. But she is a marvellous woman and we got quite chatty… but of course, I can't tell you what we talked about".

== Description ==
The Queen is depicted wearing her wattle gown by Norman Hartnell, which she had worn on her first evening engagement during the 1954 Royal tour in Sydney. Dargie said, "I was never more impressed than when I saw wearing her wattle gown. It was regal and it was Australian. And that was the gown I wanted to paint her in ... I knew I had to have that wattle gown". She is also wearing a sprig of wattle on her shoulder.

In the portrait, the Queen is wearing the Girls of Great Britain and Ireland Tiara, which was given to her by Queen Mary, and a diamond necklace gifted by the Nizam of Hyderabad Mir Osman Ali Khan.

The Queen is shown seated against a greenish background with her hands folded simply in her lap.

== Reception ==
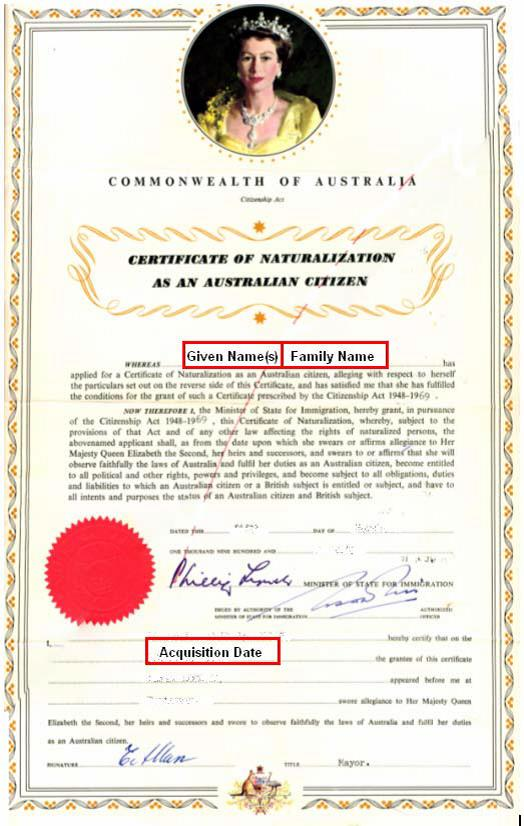
The portrait on an Australian Naturalisation Certificate

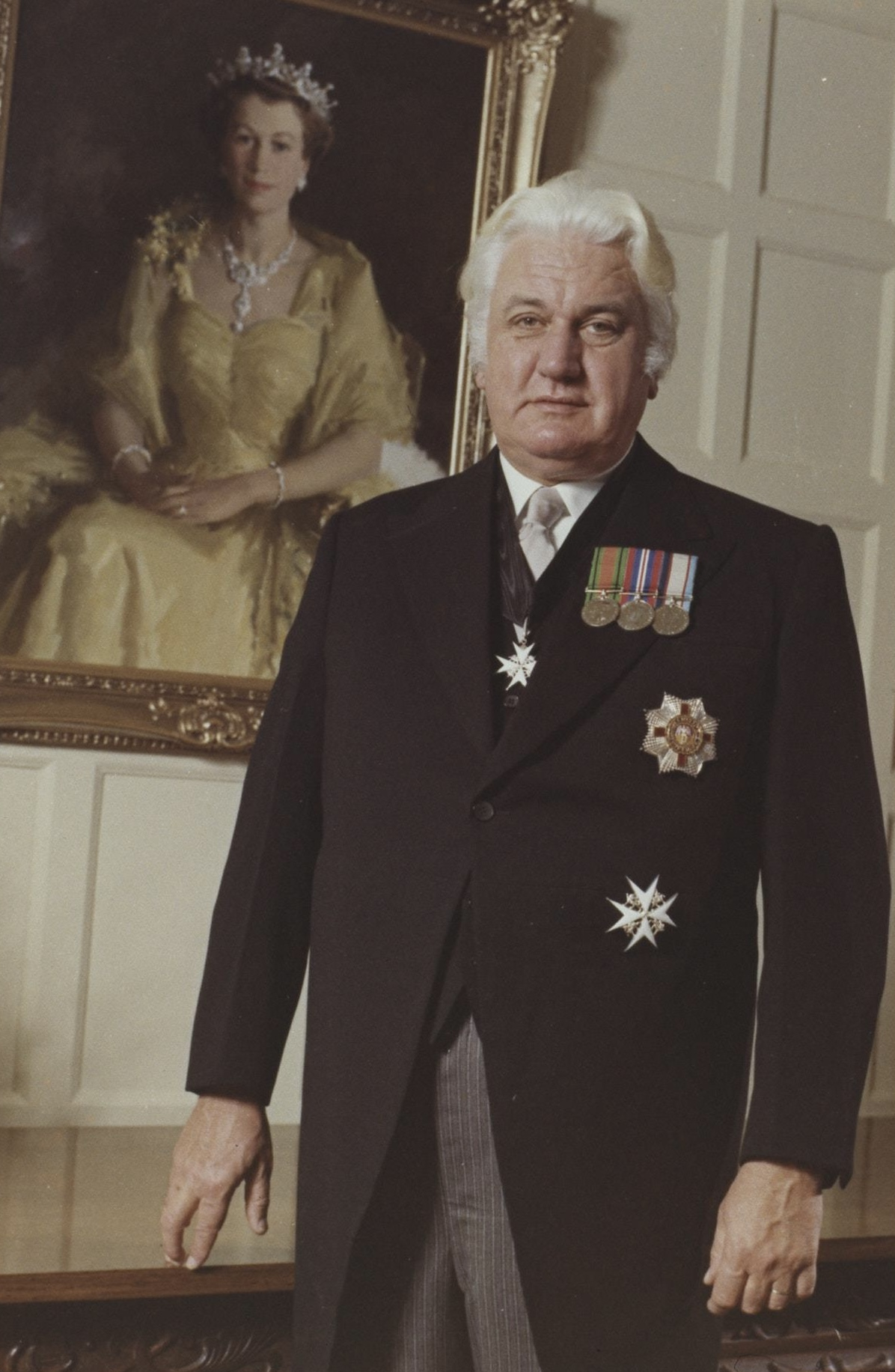
Governor-General Sir John Kerr posing in front of the portrait, 1974

The portrait was officially presented to the Australian Commonwealth in 1955 by Mrs Beveridge at Parliament House on 21 April, the Queen's birthday, and was received by Prime Minister Robert Menzies through the Governor-General William Slim. The portrait was received well by Australians and the Australian Government, and became the Queen's official Australian portrait. Owned by the Historical Memorials Committee, it remains on long-term loan for permanent display at Parliament House in Canberra. It became known as the "Wattle Painting", and has been described as "one of the most recognisable and treasured examples of 20th century Australian portraiture". Within a short time of its completion, the painting took on the status of an official portrait.

Colour prints of the painting were made available and began to appear in Federal, State and Local Government Departments, and many schools, hospitals, libraries and church halls throughout Australia. Under the terms of the 1954 Australian Citizenship Convention, a print of the work was generally present in local town halls where many naturalisation ceremonies took place.

The portrait became affectionately known as "Wattle Queen", and the Queen herself referred it as a "nice friendly portrait".

On 8 April 1994, a 45 cent stamp of the Queen was issued by Australia Post to commemorate the Queen's birthday, which featured Dargie's wattle painting.

The portrait formed the centrepiece of the National Memorial Service for the Queen at Parliament House in Canberra on 22 September 2022, held days after her state funeral.

== Replicas ==
By December 1954, Dargie became increasingly concerned that the portrait may be damaged or lost in transit back to Australia. So, he painted a replica of the painting. This replica was painted upside down in his room in the Fairley residence in London. This painting is now in the collection of the National Museum of Australia.

The Queen, who was said to be "delighted" with the result of the Wattle Painting, asked Dargie to paint a third replica for her personal collection. The painting was one of only a few paintings of herself which the Queen had kept.
