= Tom Green (artist) =

Australian artist (1913-1981)

- Born: Alfred Thomas Green; 17 June 1913; Warwickshire, England, United Kingdom
- Died: 27 January 1981 (aged 67); Moss Vale, New South Wales, Australia
- Known for: Painting; Printmaking

Alfred Thomas Green (17 June 1913 – 27 January 1981) was an Australian artist. He was a painter, printmaker and art teacher.

His work is held in the collection of the Art Gallery of New South Wales, Christchurch Art Gallery, and the University of New South Wales.
