= William Rowell =

English sportsman and businessman

William Irvine Rowell (19 June 1869 – 17 December 1916) was an English businessman and a sportsman who played rugby union for Cambridge University and first-class cricket for the university team as well. He was born at Singapore and died at Stansted Mountfitchet, Essex.

Rowell was educated at Marlborough College and Jesus College, Cambridge. He was captain of cricket at Marlborough and was tried in trial matches and a few first-class games for Cambridge University in each of his first three years at the university from 1888 to 1890, without achieving any real success. The 1891 season, Rowell's last at the university, went in much the same direction with a few unsuccessful games, after which he was dropped from the university team; but towards the end of June he was picked for the Marylebone Cricket Club (MCC) team to play against Cambridge University and scored 53 as an opening batsman, more than the whole Cambridge team mustered in their first innings. That led to his recall for the University Match against Oxford University at Lord's, which Cambridge won narrowly, though Rowell contributed scores of just 3 and 1. It was his last first-class match. Earlier in the same academic year, he had also been selected for a rugby union Blue as a forward in the match against Oxford; Sammy Woods was in both the rugby and cricket teams alongside him.

Rowell graduated from Cambridge University with a Bachelor of Arts degree in 1891. His later career is not certain, but the directory of Cambridge alumni states that he became a brewer.
