= Alfred Coleman (artist) =

Australian painter

Alfred Coleman (1890–1952) was an artist in Victoria, Australia. He was active in the 1920s and painted in the impressionist style. He is best known for his landscapes and seascapes. Coleman won the Albury Prize in 1952. His works include Beaumaris Cliffs. He died in 1952.
