= George Duncan (painter) =

Australian painter (1904–1974)

George Bernard Duncan (7 January 1904 – 8 May 1974) was an Australian painter born in New Zealand.

He studied around 1925 under Dattilo Rubbo at the Royal Art Society. It was here he met Alison Rehfisch and they began sharing studio space. She left her husband and they met up in London in 1934, where they studied, worked and travelled, including a three month stay in Spain. He spent the war years as a camouflage artist, returning to Sydney in 1942 to marry Alison, her husband having died in 1938.

In 1947 their home burnt down and Alison lost several hundred paintings. Friends arranged an auction at the home of Desiderius Orban. He and Alison moved to the country and took to painting landscapes around Berrima, Moss Vale and Goulburn but returned to Sydney when he secured a position as director of David Jones Art Gallery, which he held from 1953 to 1964. They bought a house "Hillgrove" in Pymble which she decorated extensively. After George died of cancer, she was inconsolable and took her own life.

He was president of the Australian Watercolour Institute from 1958

He was treasurer of Contemporary Art Society, Sydney from 1950

== Exhibitions ==
A joint retrospective of George's and Alison's work was held at Macquarie Galleries in 1976.

== Sources ==
- Encyclopedia of Australian Art Alan McCulloch, Hutchinson of London, 1968
