= Eric Wilson (artist) =

Australian painter

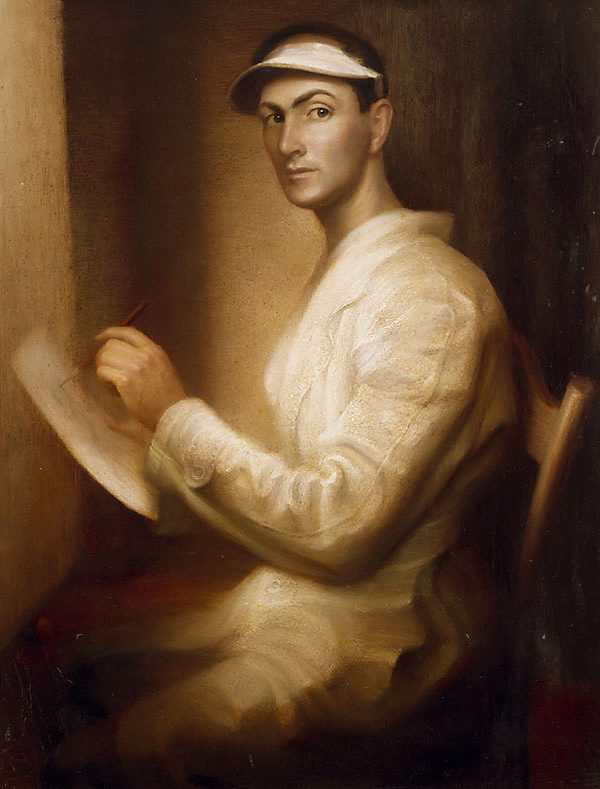
- Born: 5 January 1911; Annandale, Sydney, Australia
- Died: 25 November 1946 (aged 35); Sydney, Australia
- Known for: Painting

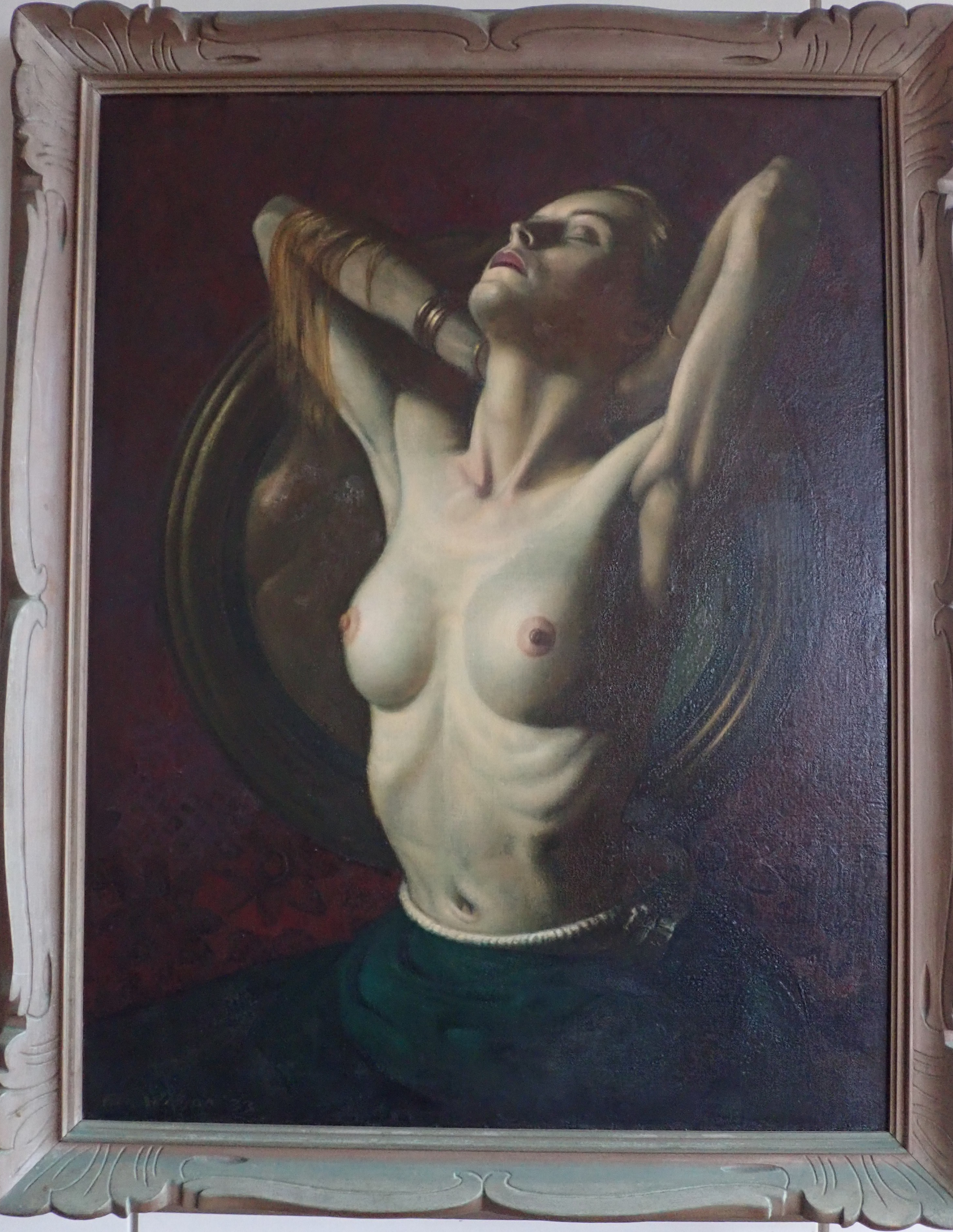
Julian Ashton's niece (artist Eric Wilson)

Eric Wilson (5 January 1911 – 25 November 1946) was an Australian painter. He was born in Annandale, Sydney, in Australia.

== Life and work ==
He won the New South Wales Travelling Art Scholarship in 1937. With this scholarship, Wilson relocated to England for two years. He studied under Henry Moore and Elmslie Owen. During his time in England, he also went to the Netherlands, Italy and Paris, France.His painting of Scott Street, Glasgow is a scene two hundred yards north of Glasgow School of Art. Glasgow School of Art stands on Scott Street, Glasgow but is behind the artist's viewpoint. He returned to Australia and began creating works in the cubist style. He was commissioned by Keith Murdoch, who had Wilson work at his home in Murrumbidgee Shire. He died of cancer in 1946.

His work is held in the collection of the Art Gallery of New South Wales and National Gallery of Victoria.

== Notable awards ==
- New South Wales Travelling Art Scholarship, 1937
