= Arthur Murch =

Australian artist

Arthur James Murch (8 July 1902, Croydon (Sydney) – 3 September 1989, Avalon (Sydney)) was an Australian artist who won the Archibald Prize in 1949 with a portrait of Bonar Dunlop. Dunlop was a New Zealand artist sculptor and illustrator.

== Biography ==
Antonio Dattilo-Rubbo introduced him to the French Post-Impressionists, Cézanne and Seurat. His style later became more Cubist. In 1924, he studied with Rayner Hoff at East Sydney Technical College.

Murch spent time training in London at the Chelsea Polytechnic and at Académie Julian, Paris and visiting Italy after winning the 1925 Society of Artists' Scholarship.

From 1927 to 1930 he worked with artist George Lambert, assisting him with sculptural commissions.

In 1933, he formed part of an Australian expedition into central Australia to Hermannsberg. He later shared his experiences in The Home magazine. In 1936, he exhibited works at the Macquarie Galleries, created after his second "Centralian" expedition, showing landscapes and portraits of the Pentupui indigenous community. In 1937 Murch became a foundation member of, and exhibited with, Robert Menzies' anti-modernist organisation, the Australian Academy of Art. Ironically, Much's painting style displays strong Art Deco leanings.

He was appointed as an official war artist for six months during the Second World War covering the American and Australia military activities in Australia – 47 works of his are in the Australian War Memorial's collection.

Murch wrote occasionally on art subjects for The Home magazine.

Awards
Preceded by William Dobell	Archibald Prize; 1949 for Bonar Dunlop	Succeeded by William Dargie
