= William Dargie =

Australian painter (1912–2003)

Captain Sir William Dargie CBE
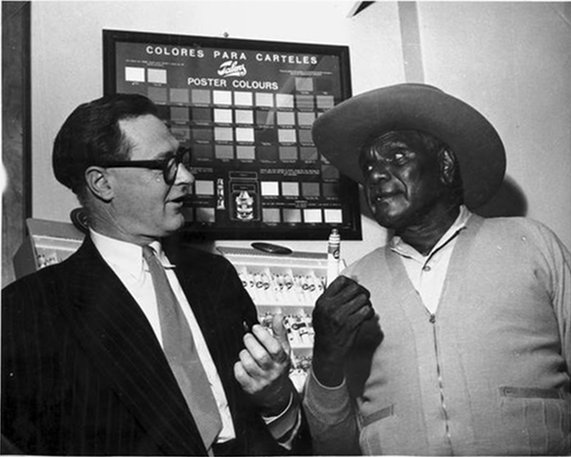
- Dargie with Albert Namatjira, late 1940s
- Born: William Alexander Dargie; 4 June 1912; Footscray, Victoria, Australia
- Died: 26 July 2003 (aged 91); Melbourne, Victoria, Australia
- Known for: Artist
- Style: Portrait painting
- Awards: Archibald Prize: (8) 1941, 1942, 1945, 1946, 1947, 1950, 1952, 1956

Captain Sir William Alexander Dargie CBE (4 June 1912 – 26 July 2003) was a renowned Australian painter, known especially for his portrait paintings. He won the Archibald Prize, Australia's premier award for portrait artists on eight occasions; a record held since 1952.

Dargie was an official Australian war artist during World War II and painted multiple portraits of Elizabeth II, Queen of Australia, as well as the official portraits of two Prime Ministers of Australia and two Governors-General of Australia. Dargie painted in a conservative style and is now largely forgotten despite his substantial artistic achievements.

== Biography ==
William Dargie was born in Footscray, Victoria, the first son of Andrew Dargie and Adelaide (née Sargent). His younger brother, Horrie Dargie, was a noted Australian musician and harmonicist.

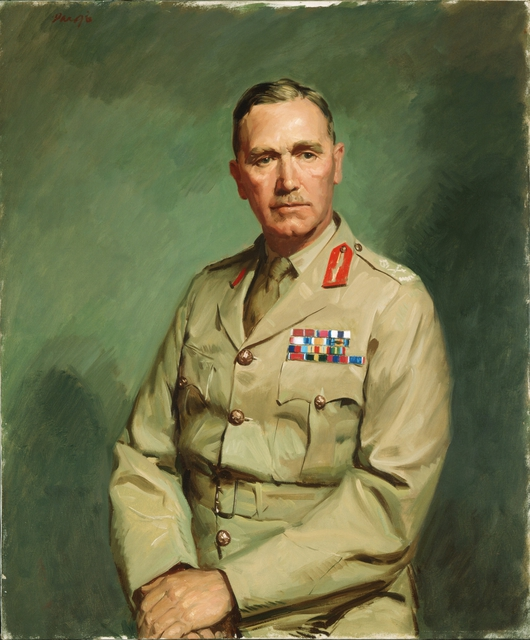
Portrait of Lt-General the Hon. Edmund Herring for which Dargie won the 1945 Archibald Prize

When he was young, he met important Australian artists such as Arthur Streeton and Tom Roberts. During World War II, he served with the Australian Army in the Middle East, New Guinea, India and Burma, rising to the rank of Captain. He was digging a trench in Tobruk, Libya, when he was informed that he had won the Archibald Prize in 1942. More than 500 of his paintings, drawings and sketches are in the collection of the Australian War Memorial, Canberra.

In December 1954, he was commissioned by Melbourne industrialist James P. Beveridge to paint Australia's official portrait of the Queen, who posed for him at Buckingham Palace. That was the first of two portraits he created of the Queen. The second, a replica of the first, was painted as "insurance" in case the first was lost in transit to Australia. The original hangs in Australia's Parliament House, while the replica is displayed in the National Museum of Australia. The "wattle painting", as it became known, was well received by the Australian public, and became one of the most recognisable and treasured examples of 20th-century Australian portraiture. Shortly after its completion, colour prints were made available and the work took on the status of official portrait.

For many postwar immigrants, that portrait was their first encounter with an artwork by an Australian artist, because it was reproduced on Australian naturalisation papers from the mid-1950s. Under the terms of the 1954 Australian Citizenship Convention, a print of the work was generally present in local town halls, where many naturalisation ceremonies took place.

Dargie painted the Duke of Edinburgh in 1956, as well as official portraits of two Australian Prime Ministers: Sir Arthur Fadden and Sir John McEwen. Other famous Australians who sat for him included Sir Charles Kingsford Smith, Dame Enid Lyons and Margaret Court. Other commissions included General John Baker, Chief of the Australian Defence Force.

He held positions on several gallery boards, serving on the Commonwealth Art Advisory Board for twenty years. Between 1946 and 1953, he was head of the Victorian Art School at the National Gallery of Victoria.

While he is best known for his portraits, he also painted other works, such as smaller interior views, landscapes and still lifes.

William Dargie died in Melbourne on 26 July 2003, aged 91, two months after the death of his wife Lady Dargie (née Kathleen Howlitt). He was a Freemason.

== Archibald Prize ==
Dargie won the Archibald Prize more times than any other artist. His winning portraits are:

- 1941 - Sir James Elder, KBE (Image)
- 1942 - Corporal Jim Gordon, VC (Image)
- 1945 - Lt-General The Hon Edmund Herring, KBC, DSO, MC, ED (Image)
- 1946 - L C Robson, MC, MA (Image)
- 1947 - Sir Marcus Clark, Kt., K.B.E. [sic] (Image)
- 1950 - Sir Leslie McConnan (Image)
- 1952 - Mr Essington Lewis, CH (Image)
- 1956 - Mr Albert Namatjira (Image)

== Honours ==
- Officer of the Order of the British Empire (OBE), 1 January 1960, "Member of the Commonwealth Art Advisory Board"
- Commander of the Order of the British Empire (CBE), 1 January 1969, "Member of the Commonwealth Art Advisory Board"
- Knight Bachelor, 13 June 1970, "In recognition of service to the arts"
- Centenary Medal, 1 January 2001, "For service to Australian society and art"

== See also ==
- Art of Australia

Awards
Preceded by Max Meldrum	Archibald Prize; 1941 for Sir James Elder, K.B.E. 1942 for Corporal Jim Gordon, V.C.	Succeeded by William Dobell
Preceded by Joshua Smith	Archibald Prize; 1945 for Lt-General The Hon. Edmund Herring, K.B.C., D.S.O., M.C., E.D. 1946 for L .C. Robson, M.C., M.A. 1947 for Sir Marcus Clarke, K.B.E.	Succeeded by William Dobell
Preceded by Arthur Murch	Archibald Prize; 1950 for Sir Leslie McConnan	Succeeded by Ivor Hele
Preceded by Ivor Hele	Archibald Prize; 1952 for Mr. Essington Lewis, C.H.	Succeeded by Ivor Hele
Preceded by Ivor Hele	Archibald Prize; 1956 for Mr. Albert Namatjira	Succeeded by Ivor Hele
