= Waller house (Melbourne, Victoria) =

Heritage-listed house in Melbourne, Victoria, Australia

- Location of the house in Greater Metropolitan Melbourne

General information
- Status: Completed
- Type: House and collection
- Architectural style: Inter-war California Bungalow; Inter-war Old English
- Location: 9–9A Crown Road, Ivanhoe, City of Banyule, Melbourne, Victoria, Australia
- Coordinates: 37°46′55″S 145°02′16″E
- Named for: Napier Waller and Christian Waller
- Completed: 1922; 104 years ago
- Client: Napier and Christian Waller

Technical details
- Material: Reinforced concrete; timber
- Grounds: 1.4 ha (3.5 acres)

Design and construction
- Architects: Napier Waller; Percy Meldrum
- Main contractor: Phillip Millsom

Website
- nationaltrust.org.au

Site notes
- Management: National Trust of Australia (Victoria)
- Public access: Monthly; every second Sunday; Guided tour only; book online

Victorian Heritage Register
- Official name: Waller House and Collection
- Type: Registered place; Registered object integral to a registered place
- Criteria: a., d., h.
- Designated: 19 February 1986
- Reference no.: H0617
- Heritage overlay no.: HO22
- Categories: Residential buildings (private); Collections

Register of the National Estate
- Official name: Waller House
- Type: Defunct register
- Designated: 30 June 1992
- Reference no.: 15291

The Waller house is a house and its collection, located at 9–9A Crown Road in Ivanhoe, in the City of Banyule, in the northern suburbs of Melbourne, in Victoria, Australia. The Waller House and Collection includes all the buildings (interiors and exteriors), fixed and movable objects and the garden.

Built in 1922 on the traditional lands of the Wurundjeri people, the house and its collection were added to the Victorian Heritage Register on 19 February 1986 in recognition of its architectural, historical, and social significance; and was also added to non-statutory lists by the Victorian branch of the National Trust on 21 September 1978 and the now defunct Register of the National Estate on 30 June 1992.

The house and its collection are managed by the Victorian branch of the National Trust.

== History ==
The Waller house was the residence of (Mervyn) Napier Waller CMG OBE, the acclaimed artist who gained National fame from his watercolours, stained glass, mosaic works and murals and his wife Christian, who was a distinguished artist and designer of stained glass in her own right.

Napier and Christian Waller were married in 1915. Napier lost his right arm while serving on the Western Front in 1916. After he returned to Australia in 1917, Christian supported him briefly by working as a commercial artist. Napier Waller bought the land at 9 and 9A Crown Street in 1920. He discharged the mortgage to the War Services Homes Commissioner in 1922 and the house was constructed by builder Phillip Millsom in the same year.

Napier Waller lived at the house continuously for fifty years, while Christian Waller lived there on and off for thirty years. The house tells the story of the artists' home and of their work spaces and is a memorial to them. Following Christian's death in 1954, all images, objects, and artworks created by or depicting her were removed from the house and either gifted to Klytie Pate, Christian's niece, or were sold, and are held by the National Gallery of Victoria, the National Gallery of Australia, Beleura, and in private collections. Some of the artistic works of the Wallers – both Napier and Christian – adorn the Melbourne Town Hall, the Myer Mural hall, the State Library of Victoria, and the Australian War Memorial, in Canberra.

=== In popular culture ===
External shots of the house and studio were used as a backdrop to represent Dr Blake's house in the television series The Doctor Blake Mysteries.

== Description ==
=== House ===
The Waller house is a split-level house designed by Waller and his wife, in conjunction with Percy Meldrum. The Wallers intended the house to be both a home and a workplace. For this the design was conceived to accommodate the tall cartoons of the artist's work. The Waller house was built by Phillip Millsom in 1922 and the architectural style of the house is a mixture of Inter-war California Bungalow and Inter-war Old English. The buildings include the main house with semi-detached sunroom and laundry/bathroom, a separate garage and a separate art studio. The garden near the house includes plantings, terraces and garden rooms with brick and stone edged gravel paths, brick or stone walls and concrete paths. A less formal bush garden is located further away from the house.

The house is constructed from reinforced concrete walls with a rough cast finish. The roof is steeply pitched with a prominent half timbered gable over the front entrance and has Marseilles pattern terracotta tiles. There are small paned casement windows. There have been several additions to the original design over the years but these have all been sympathetic to the original design. The house is entered from a two sided verandah into an entrance hall, panelled in Tasmanian wood. This has stairs leading to the different levels of the house interior. In one direction the hall leads to a main living hall which was Waller's original studio and later used as the main living room in the house. This room has a high ceiling with casement windows, musicians gallery and a broad brick fireplace flanked by fire-dogs and bellows made by the sculptress Ola Cohn.

The entrance hall leads in the other direction to a guest room, known as the blue room. This was the idea of Christian Waller and has simple built-in glass topped furniture and Napier Waller's murals of the Labours of Hercules. An alcove section of the room was constructed out of an extension to the verandah. Stairs lead from the entrance hall to the musicians gallery which has a window and overlooks the studio/living room. The kitchen near the studio/hall is panelled and raftered with built-in cupboards conforming to the panelling. The ceiling is stencilled in a fleur-de-lys design by Waller. The dining room lies to the right of the studio/hall and contains shoulder high panelling and raftered ceilings. It has an angled brick corner fireplace and the walls and ceiling have the same painted treatment as the studio/living room.

=== Collection ===
The Collection includes artworks by Napier Waller; Napier and Christian Waller's full-size cartoons for stained-glass windows, library, art materials, tools and equipment as well as items associated with the Wallers including a collection of Melbourne Art Pottery, rugs and household items. Most of these objects are still in the house.

Like many of the other rooms in the house the studio is panelled and floored with Tasmanian hardwood and contains some of the cartoons for Waller's mosaics: The Wise and Foolish Virgins for the University of Western Australia and, Peace After Victory for the State Library of Victoria. Above the panelling the plaster walls are painted in muted colours in woodgrain effect. The raftered plaster ceiling has been painted in marble effect with gold leaf. Book shelves are built into the panelled walls. Furniture in the room includes a settee with a painted back panel, a leather suite and black bean sideboards and cupboards. This furniture was designed in the 1930s by Waller, and a noted cabinetmaker called Goulman.

The oak dining furniture was designed by Waller. A small den with high window, furnished with leather chairs, opens off the dining room. Opening off the hall to the left is a long rectangular room known as the glass studio. This was added to the house by builder C Trinck of Hampton in about 1931 and contains Waller's kiln, stained glass designs and racks which are still stacked with radiant streaked glass from Waller's work with stained glass windows. A bedroom and bathroom with attic pitched rafter ceiling and casement windows is situated on the upper level of the house. Another bedroom in ship's cabin style with flared wall light fittings and built in bunks opens off this first bedroom.

The house backs onto a courtyard enclosed by a long bluestone garden wall. The house is set on 1.4 hectares (3.5 acres), with cypress hedges and gravelled paths. The garden drops away to a hillside slope with manna gum trees. Set on the slope is a flat roofed studio built in 1937. It has an undercroft beneath a studio room and this contains a lithographic press and a printing press of 1849 for woodcuts and linocuts. This was used by Napier and Christian Waller to produce prints in the 1930s.

== See also ==
- Architecture of Melbourne
- List of places on the Victorian Heritage Register in the City of Banyule
