= Mary Livingstone (disambiguation) =

Mary Livingstone or Livingston may refer to:

- Mary Livingstone (1905–1983), American radio comedian
- Mary Moffat Livingstone (1821–1862), wife of the missionary, David Livingstone
- Mary Livingston (1541–1582), lady-in-waiting to Mary, Queen of Scots
- Mary Elizabeth Livingston (1857–1913), Australian artist
- Mary Livingston Ripley (1914–1996), née Mary Livingston, horticulturalist
