= Govett =

Govett is a surname, and may refer to:

- Francis Algernon Govett (1858–1926), British stockbroker and company director
- James William Govett (1910–1998), Australian impressionist painter
- John Govett, 19th-century politician in Queensland, Australia
- Jonathan Govett (born 1969), English cricketer
- Robert Govett (1813–1901), British theologian and independent minister
- William Romaine Govett (1807–1848), painter and surveyor in New South Wales
