= Lewellin =

Lewellin can be both a surname and a middle name. Notable people with the name include:

- Llewelyn Lewellin (1798–1878), British priest
- Madeline Lewellin (1854–1944), Australian artist
- Winifred Lewellin James (1876–1941), Australian writer
