= Edith Grieve =

Australian illustrator and commercial artist (1892–1972)

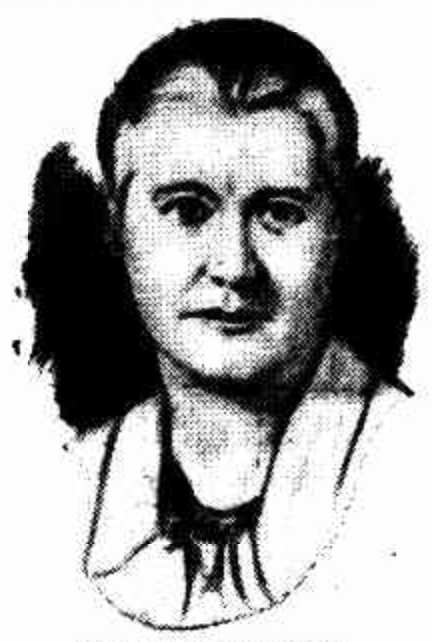
- Grieve in 1950
- Born: 12 November 1892; Surrey Hills, Victoria, Australia
- Died: 30 March 1972 (aged 79); Camberwell, Victoria, Australia
- Resting place: Box Hill Cemetery
- Education: National Gallery of Victoria Art School

Edith Grieve (12 November 1892 – 30 March 1972) was an Australian illustrator and commercial artist.

== Biography ==
Grieve was born on 12 November 1892 at Surrey Hills in Victoria. She was the daughter of Canadian Rachel (née Tweed) and Scottish commercial traveller Henry David Grieve. She studied art at the National Gallery of Victoria Art School, where her teacher was Bernard Hall.

After World War I, Grieve and her sister Rachel, joined their brother David on a visit to their mother's relatives in Ontario, Canada. From there, they moved to Detroit in the United States, where Grieve worked as a commercial artist and illustrator with an advertising agency. The trio returned to Melbourne in late 1937, making their home at Camberwell. Grieve found work as a freelance artist, including illustrating stories for The Australasian and later with The Australian Women's Weekly.

During World War II, Grieve created a number of posters for the Red Cross, including "Hope for all Mankind in War and in Peace", held in the Australian War Memorial.

In the 1940s she published a series of children's picture books and illustrated children's books written by Irene Wilkinson and Louise Kinch.

Giving her thoughts on commercial artists and their work to The Australasian in 1946, Grieve said:

More perspiration than inspiration, and little time for the "Bohemian" atmosphere and "temperament" with which artists are often credited by the uninitiated.

In 1950 Grieve illustrated a children's colouring-in book on road safety. The print run was 500,000 copies which were distributed to children across Australia, who coloured in or painted the black and white illustrations and submitted them to a competition organised by the Commonwealth Oil Refineries for the Australian Road Safety Council. The campaign was named "Life Is So Precious".

Grieve designed and her sister Rachel wove a set of table mats and table napkins that were accepted as gifts by Queen Elizabeth II for her children during her 1954 visit to Australia. Grieve also decorated a card that was presented with a basket of flowers to the Queen on behalf of 33,000 members of the Country Women's Association in Victoria.

Grieve died at Camberwell on 30 March 1972 and was buried in Box Hill Cemetery.

Her work was included in the War Memorial exhibition at the Queensland Art Gallery in 1995.

== Works ==
=== As author/illustrator ===
- Sunny Days (1943)
- At the Zoo (1943)
- Away We Go (1943)
- Animal Friends (1943)
- Trains (1943)
- Puppies at Play (1944)

=== As illustrator ===
- Favourite Nursery Rhymes (1944)
- Walter Worm by Irene Wilkinson (1944)
- Dahlia Slug by Irene Wilkinson (1944)
- Ada Cicada by Irene Wilkinson (1945)
- Stories of Adventure by Louise Kinch (1945)
- Mrs Mosquito by Irene Wilkinson (1946)
