= Stella Marks =

Stella Marks MVO, RMS, ASMP
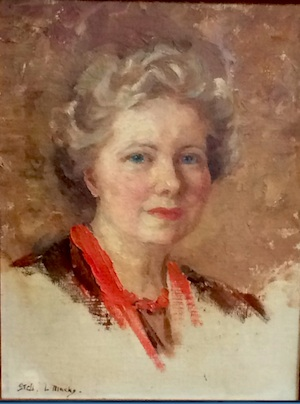
- Stella Marks self-portrait in oils, ca. 1940
- Born: 27 November 1887; Melbourne, Australia
- Died: 18 November 1985 (aged 97); Kent, United Kingdom
- Education: National Gallery of Victoria Art School, Melbourne
- Known for: Portrait miniature artist
- Notable work: Portraits of Queen Elizabeth II when she was a princess, Winston Churchill, Churchill's daughter Mary, Prince Philip, Prince Charles at age 2, and all the royal children.
- Spouse: Montagu Marks
- Awards: Member of the Victorian Order; 1978

Stella Lewis Marks MVO, RMS, ASMP (27 November 1887 – 18 November 1985) was born in the City of Melbourne, Australia. She was an artist, active in Australia, the United States of America, and Great Britain. She is best known as a portrait miniaturist, although she also made larger works in oils, charcoal, and pastels.

She was a member of the Royal Society of Miniature Painters, Sculptors and Gravers, and the American Society of Miniature Painters. In the early 20th century, she painted a number of well-known personalities, particularly in America, before moving to the UK in 1934.

In 1948, she was commissioned to paint a portrait miniature of Queen Elizabeth II, who was then H.R.H. the Princess Elizabeth, by the Duke of Edinburgh, and since then she painted 14 miniatures of members of the British royal family. She was awarded the honor, Member of the Royal Victorian Order on 30 December 1978.

She was married to fellow artist Montagu Marks, who became prominent in the British film industry as general manager of London Films.

== Life and work ==
Stella Marks was born in Carlton, Melbourne, Australia, to Mary (née Fennell) Lewis and James Joseph Lewis. She received her artistic training at the National Gallery of Victoria Art School under Lindsay Bernard Hall and Frederick McCubbin.

In 1912, she painted her first miniature after being persuaded to do so by fellow artists Penleigh Boyd and Montagu Marks.

She moved to New York City with her husband in 1914 and quickly made a name for herself in artistic and society circles. In 1916 she was commissioned by the Governor General of Canada, the Duke of Connaught and Strathearn, to paint a miniature of his daughter, the Princess Patricia of Connaught. It was reported that 100,000 copies of the miniature, which was considered by the Princess to be the best existing portrait of herself, were printed and sold on behalf of the Canadian Red Cross. Signed copies were given by Princess Patricia to the next-of-kin of each fallen member of her regiment, "The Princess Pat's".

Some other notable portrait miniatures painted between 1915 and 1934 during her time in America (which also included trips to Japan, Australia, and Great Britain) were of the famous spy, Sydney Reilly, and his 'wife' Nadine; the actresses Marjorie Williamson, Mrs. Madge Carr and Edith Day; musician, Jan Cherniavsky; multi-millionaire, Knox Studebaker; a Japanese lady, Mrs. T. Akaboshi; the occultist, Aleister Crowley; musician and dancer, Maud Allan; and Joseph McKenna, Associate Justice of the Supreme Court of the United States. The latter two were purchased by the Felton Bequest on behalf of the National Gallery of Victoria's permanent collection.

In 1934, although not an American citizen, Marks was offered the presidency of the American Society of Miniature Painters. She had to turn down the honor due to her move to the UK. She left New York because her husband, Montagu Marks, joined the film mogul Alexander Korda and became general manager of London Films Productions. At the time Montagu Marks was pivotal in helping to secure funding for Alexander Korda from Prudential Insurance.

Between 1931 and 1940, a number of Marks' works were exhibited at the London Royal Academy of Arts.

In 1941, she painted a miniature of Mary Churchill, Winston Churchill's youngest daughter. It is said that Winston Churchill always carried the miniature with him on his wartime journeys.

In 1948, on the recommendation of Sir James Mann, director of the Wallace Collection, the Duke of Edinburgh commissioned Marks to paint H.R.H. the Princess Elizabeth. As a result of this Royal commission, she painted miniatures of Prince Philip and all the royal children, including the first ever portrait of Prince Charles, aged two.

Another notable miniature of Marks' later work was a "miniature within a miniature" of Sir Winston Churchill painted in 1966.

On 30 December 1978, Marks was awarded the honor, Member of the Victorian Order.

In 1980, she resigned from the Royal Miniature Society because she had become almost completely blind.

Marks died on 18 November 1985, in Kent, United Kingdom.
