= National Gallery of Victoria Art School =

Former fine arts college in Melbourne, Australia

Coordinates: 37°48′36″S 144°57′53″E

- Type: Private
- Established: 1867; 159 years ago
- Location: Melbourne, Victoria, Australia

The National Gallery of Victoria Art School, associated with the National Gallery of Victoria, was a private fine arts college founded in 1867 and was Australia's leading art school of 50 years.

It is also referred to as the 'National Gallery School' ‘National Gallery Art School’, ‘National Gallery School of Art’ and ‘Victorian National Gallery School of Art’. Official correspondence commencing from the 1950s is headed ‘National Gallery of Victoria Art School’ and in McCulloch’s Encyclopedia of Australian Art, it is abbreviated 'NGC School'.

It was the leading centre for academic art training in Australia until about 1910. Among its luminaries, the school was headed by Sir William Dargie in 1946–53, John Brack from 1962–68, and Lenton Parr from 1968 to its absorption into the newly created Victorian College of the Arts.

== History ==
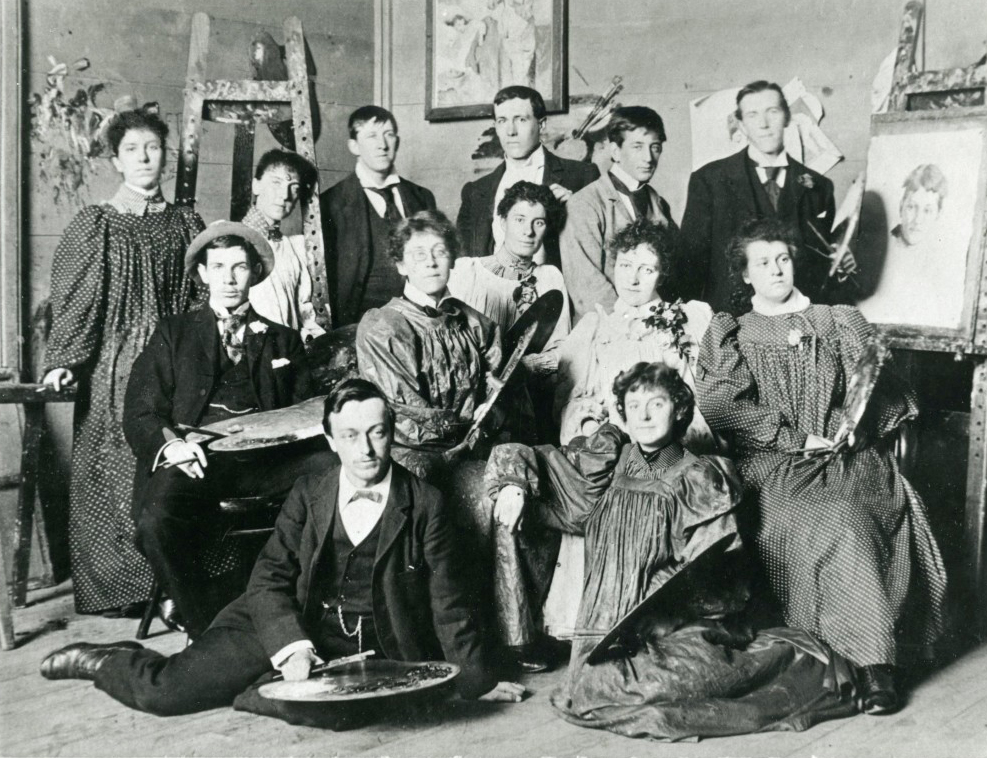
National Gallery of Victoria Art School students in 1896: Back: Amy Mann, Agnes Kirkwood, Leon Pole, George Coates, Albert Ends, Hugh Ramsay Middle: James S. MacDonald, Dora Meeson, Jo Sweatman, Ada Coutie, Isabel Hunter Front: George Pontin, Portia Geach

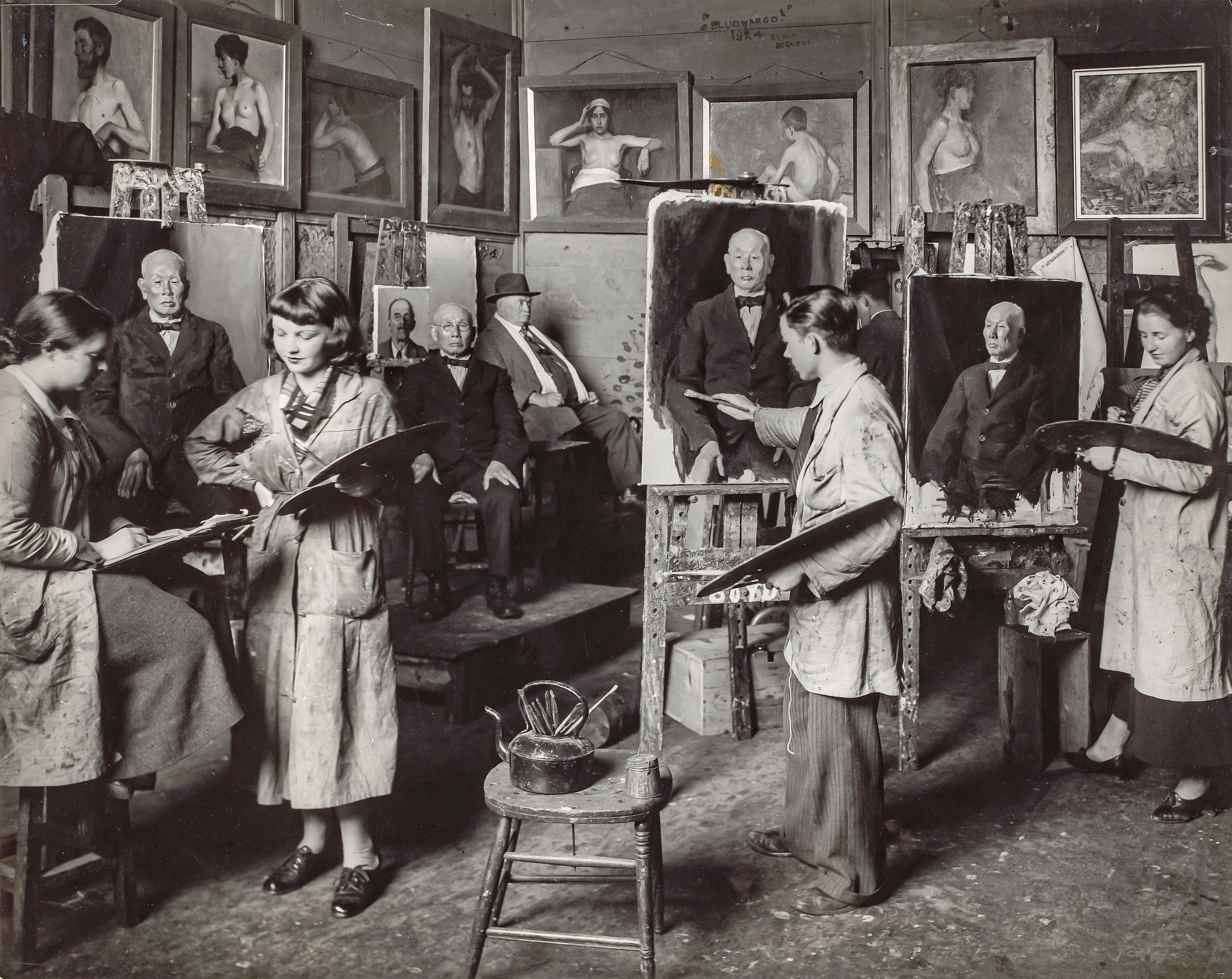
Melbourne National Gallery School life class in 1935 (L-R) Phyl Waterhouse, Alannah Coleman, Charles Bush, Jean Mcinnes and Miss Eastwood (posed not in front of their own canvases). On the walls; works by Hugh Ramsay, John Longstaff, Max Meldrum, James Quinn, Isaac Cohen and Charles Wheeler. Taken for Table Talk magazine

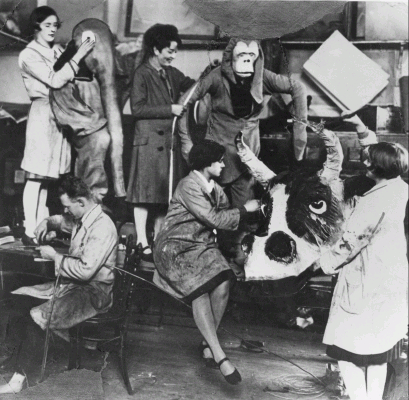
A group of students at the National Gallery of Victoria Art School with animal costumes c. 1930

The State Library of Victoria, a public library, opened in Melbourne in 1859, and from 1861 it housed a Museum of Art and a Picture Gallery, opened in 1864, both situated alongside the Public Library on Swanston Street between LaTrobe and Russell Streets. Its art collection was named the National Gallery of Victoria in 1869.

At the suggestion of Thomas Clark, who was to become teacher of drawing, a National Gallery Art School, School of Design was formed and started enrolling students in June 1867, then was divided into two schools in 1870. Eugene von Guerard, then 60 years old, was appointed Instructor of Painting and Master of the School of Art. Thomas Clark was appointed Instructor and Master of the School of Design which prepared students for the School of Painting, a separate institution. In 1887 the School of Design became the Drawing School. By the turn of the century, its teaching largely followed that of the Academies of Europe.

Students enrolling were required to demonstrate only rudimentary artistic skill and came from all over the country, paying a very reasonable ten shillings per term (a value of A$40–50 in 2022) in the 1920s. They commenced with drawing in charcoal from plaster casts, before proceeding to working from the nude model. The museum provided classes in natural history, and students benefitted from ready access to its art collections. Prizes were instituted in 1887 and gradually increased in number and value, the most desirable being the Traveling Scholarship which was later the Keith and Elisabeth Murdoch Travelling Fellowship.

A past students' club was formed in the early 1920s and held reunions attended by many who were to become significant artists, including Norah Gurdon, Victor Cobb, Dora Wilson, Elma Roach, Madge Freeman, Ruth Hollick, and Isabel May Tweddle.

After World War II, ex- servicemen and women training under the Commonwealth Reconstruction Training Scheme (CRTS) were accommodated in a third department. By 1953 the School had reverted to a Drawing School and a Painting School. Among its alumni are counted many of the most prominent Australian artists.

== Merger creating the Victorian College of the Arts ==
The National Gallery Art School ceased as an independent institution in 1973 when it became the foundation school of the Victorian College of the Arts (VCA) which became an affiliated college of the University of Melbourne in July 1991. On 1 January 1992 an Act of Parliament brought the components of former Prahran College, Victoria College's Prahran Campus and Prahran College of TAFE, under the auspices of Swinburne University of Technology, with the only tertiary courses, Graphics and Industrial Design, remaining on the campus, all others being moved to Deakin University. Prahran Fine Art under Gareth Sansom was relocated and amalgamated with the Victorian College of the Arts, where the next Dean of Art was William Kelly.

As the VCA was not already split into departments, it was the Prahran heads who were led such, and newly created, roles in several cases; with Pam Hallandal becoming head of drawing (then retiring at the end of 1993); head of ceramics was Greg Wain, previously head of ceramics at Prahran; Victor Majzner likewise became head of painting at the VCA; Prahran Graduate, Christopher Köller was head of their new department of Photography. Printmaking had been a separate Department at VCA before the merger, the head being a Prahran graduate, Allan Mitelman, who was replaced by John Scurry, head of printmaking at Prahran. Jock Clutterbuck (VCA) and David Wilson (Prahran) alternated the role of head of the newly merged Department of Sculpture.

== Faculty and alumni ==
=== Heads of the school and teachers of painting ===
- 1870–81: Eugène von Guérard
- 1882–91: George Frederick Folingsby
- 1891–1935: Lindsay Bernard Hall
- 1935–36: William Beckwith McInnes
- 1936–45: Charles Wheeler (painter)
- 1945–46: William Rowell (acting head)
- 1946–53: William Dargie
- 1948: Hayward Veal (deputy)
- 1953–54: Murray Griffin (acting)
- 1954–62: Alan Sumner
- 1963–68: John Brack

=== Teachers of drawing, assistant heads of school ===
- 1870–76: Thomas Clark
- 1876–86: Oswald Rose Campbell
- 1886–1917: Frederick McCubbin
- 1907–08: Leslie Wilkie (acting)
- 1917–39: William Beckwith Mcinnes
- 1933: George Bell (acting)
- 1939–41: A. E. Newbury
- 1941–46: William Rowell
- 1946–53: Murray Griffin
- 1954–55: Charles Bush
- 1956–61: Rod Clark
- 1961–62: Ian Armstrong
- 1962–68: *Marc Clark

=== Alumni ===
The School's graduates and former students, with those whose dates of attendance are known, include:

- Mary Cecil Allen (c.1910–c.1912)
- Edith Alsop (1871 – 1958)
- Leonard Lloyd Annois (1930–32)
- Ian Armstrong (1943–1950) (Drawing Master 1960–1966)
- Sam Atyeo (1928–1932)
- Alice Marian Ellen Bale (1895–1905)
- Caroline Barker (1912–19)
- Elsie Barlow
- Margaret Francis Ellen Baskerville (1880, 1882–85)
- Clifford William Bayliss (1933–1935)
- Clarice Beckett (1914–16)
- Yosl Bergner (c.1938–9)
- Peter Booth (1962–65)
- Arthur Boyd (1935–36)
- David Boyd
- Emma Boyd (1885–89)
- Merric Boyd (c.1908)
- Penleigh Boyd (1907–09)
- Barbara Brash (1946–1949)
- Ernest Buckmaster(1918–1924)
- Norma Bull (c.1929)
- Rupert Bunny (1881–84)
- Frances Mary Burke (c.1932–36)
- Ian Burn (1961–62)
- Charles Bush (1935–40)
- Horace Brodzky
- Mary Card (c.1880)
- Norman St Clair Carter (1892–98)
- Ann Church (1946)
- George James Coates (1890s)
- Victor Cobb
- Colin Colahan (1917)
- Alannah Coleman (1933-39)
- Alexander Colquhoun (1877–79, 1882–87)
- Archibald Douglas Colquhoun (1911–)
- Donald Cowen
- Sybil Craig (1924–31)
- Peggie Crombie (1922–28)
- Frank R. Crozier (1907)
- Janet Agnes Cumbrae Stewart (1901–07)
- Oliver James Dale (c.1944–5)
- Roy Dalgarno (1926–30)
- David Davies (1887–90)
- Isabel Davies (1966–67)
- Lawrence Daws (1949–53)
- Janet Dawson(1951–1956)
- Frances Derham (1911–1913)
- Aileen Dent (1909–16)
- Mark Denver (1922–26)
- Neil Douglas (1927–28)
- Moya Dyring (1929–32)
- Lindsay Edward (1938–41)
- Albert Enes (1892–96)
- Edith Evans (c.1890)
- Miles Evergood (1890s)
- John Farmer
- Carolyn Fels (1959–60)
- David Fitts (1968)
- Paul Fitzgerald (1940–43, 1946–47)
- Maude Fleay (1891)
- James Flett (1927–28)
- John Flexmore (1930–36)
- Sheila Florance
- Mary Hannay Foott
- E. Phillips Fox (1878–1886)
- John Frawley (1939–)
- Madge Freeman (1895–1977)
- Florence Fuller (1883, 1888)
- Sam Fullbrook (1946)
- John Andrew Gardiner
- Portia Geach (1890–1896)
- James William Govett
- Robert Ghee (1889–92)
- Viva Gibb (1973–74)
- Julian J. Gibbs (c.1880)
- Aubrey Hicks Lawson Gibson (1920)
- Herbert Gilkes (1927–39)
- Bill Gleeson
- Nancy Grant (c.1944)
- Ina Gregory (c.1893–c.1898)
- Edith Grieve
- Ambrose Sylvester Griffin
- Murray Griffin (1919–23)
- Harley Griffiths (1894–99)
- Nornie Gude (1936–39)
- Nancy Guest (1923–26)
- Henrietta Maria Gulliver
- Norah Gurdon (1901–08)
- Tim Guthrie (1960–61)
- Oswald Hall (1934–38)
- Clewin Harcourt (1886–90)
- Sheila Hawkins (1920s)
- Melville Haysom (c.1920s)
- Edward Bonaventura Heffernan (1928–31)
- Joy Hester (1937–38)
- Geoffrey Vernon Hogg (1971)
- Ruth Hollick (1902–06)
- C. Winifred Honey (c.1911)
- John Howley (c.1949–53)
- Tom Humphrey (c.1880s)
- Gregory Irvine(1963–66)
- Julie Irving 1973
- James Jackson (1906)
- Morgan Peter Jageurs 1883–84)
- Henry James Johnstone (1870– )
- J. Llewellyn Jones (1883–89)
- Marion Jones (artist) (1912–17)
- Vernon Jones (1931)
- Justus Jorgensen (1915–17)
- Dorothea Keeling (1929–32)
- William Kelly (c.1969)
- Roger Kemp (1929, 1933–1935)
- Stephen Killick (1971–72)
- Grahame King (1934–39)
- Peter Kirk (c.1870– )
- William Dunn Knox (c.1890s)
- Paul Laspagis (1971)
- Murray Latimer (c.1945–8)
- Adrian Lawlor (1929)
- Bernard Lawson (1926)
- Lesley Lawson Clarke (1947–53)
- Donald Laycock (1949–53)
- Jan Learmonth (1966–67)
- Percy Leason (1907–10)
- John Lennox
- Sandra Leveson (1959–63)
- Robin Levett
- Madeline Lewellin
- Joan Lindsay 1916–19
- Lionel Lindsay
- Ruby Lindsay
- Mary Elizabeth Livingston (1871–79)
- Charles Salis Lloyd (c.1900s)
- John Longstaff (1883–87)
- John Samuel Loxton
- George Luke (1937–40)
- Constance Jenkins Macky (c.1908)
- Eric Spencer Macky
- Norman Macgeorge (1897–99)
- Marguerite Mahood
- Stella Marks (1906–11)
- Alan Martin (1964)
- Helen Maudsley
- Herbert McClintock (1922–27, 1929)
- Frederick McCubbin (1872–86)
- Louis McCubbin (1906–11)
- Sheila McCubbin (1914–17)
- Alan McLeod McCulloch (1926–7)
- Wilfred Arthur McCulloch
- James Stuart MacDonald
- Bertram Mackennal (1878–)
- Kenneth Charles McFayden (1954–60)
- William Beckwith McInnes (1909–11)
- Jessie Mackintosh (1908–11)
- Spencer Macky (1903)
- Dora Meeson
- Max Meldrum (1892–99)
- Bertha Merfield
- Max Middleton (1938–42)
- Godfrey Miller (1918, 1923)
- Ernest Moffitt (1890)
- Anne Montgomery (1927–32)
- Alan Moore (war artist)
- Graham Hinton Moore
- George Pitt Morison (1880– )
- Alistair Morrison
- Josephine Muntz-Adams (1884–89)
- Violet Musgrave
- Albert Ernest Newbury (1909)
- George W. Neville (c.1910)
- Lucy Newell (1927–32)
- Keith Nicol (1946–49)
- Vlase Nikoleski (1971–72)
- Sidney Nolan 1934, 1936
- Susan Norrie (1974–76)
- Marjorie North
- Charles Nuttall (1895)
- Edward Officer (1893–4)
- Helen Ogilvie (1919–21)
- Joseph Stanislaus Ostoja-Kotkowski (1950–c.1955)
- Klytie Pate (c.1931)
- Betty Paterson
- Esther Paterson (1907–12)
- Ambrose McCarthy Patterson (1890s)
- Eileen Pearcey (c.1923–26)
- L. Scott Pendlebury (1945–47)
- Adelaide Perry (1914–1920)
- Enid Philip (1918–23)
- Amelia Philips
- Ernest Sidney Philpot (1937)
- Ada May Plante (1894–99)
- Leon Pole (1888–1892)
- Richard Porteous (1911–13)
- Cedar Prest
- Margaret Preston(1893–4, 1896–7)
- Clifton Pugh (1947–50)
- Mabel Pye (1912–21)
- Guelda Pyke (1957)
- James Quinn (1887–1893)
- Iso Rae (1877–87)
- Hugh Ramsay (1894–99)
- Mel Ramsden (1963)
- Arthur Read (c.1935)
- Charles Douglas Richardson (1871–80)
- Hilda Rix 1902–05
- Paul Rigby
- Elma Roach (1913–16)
- Tom Roberts (1875–80)
- Jessie Robison (1931)
- John Rogers (1945–48)
- Herbert Rose (1914–18)
- Harry Rosengrave (1941–48)
- John Rowell (1912–17)
- William Rowell (1913–15)
- Rosemary Ryan (1950–51)
- John Shirlow (1891–94)
- Arnold Shore (1912–1917)
- Clara Southern (1883–1887)
- Ethel Spowers (1911–17)
- Constance Stokes 1925–1929
- Arthur Streeton (1882–88)
- Reginald Sturgess (1905–1912)
- Ruth Sutherland (1902–07)
- Jane Sutherland (1883)
- Jo Sweatman (1890–1898)
- Jane Tanner
- Stephanie Taylor (c.1917)
- Violet Teague (1897–)
- Jessie Traill (1902–06)
- Tudor St George Tucker (1883–1887)
- Isabel May Tweddle (1894–1897)
- Christian Waller (1910–)
- Napier Waller (1913–)
- Frederick Charles Ward (1918–20)
- Phyl Waterhouse (1933–1939)
- Leslie Wilkie (1896–1901)
- Janie Wilkinson Whyte (1890–95)
- Fred Williams 1942–49
- Dora Wilson (1901–06)
- Margery Withers (1913–22)
- Walter Withers (1884–)
