= Susan Norrie =

Australian artist

- Born: 1953 (age 72–73); Sydney, Australia
- Education: National Art School, Sydney; National Gallery of Victoria Art School, Melbourne
- Movement: Contemporary art
- Website: www.susannorrie.com

Susan Norrie (born 1953) is an Australian artist working primarily with found film and original video installations to explore political and environmental issues. In 2007 she represented Australia at the 52nd Venice Biennale.

== Early Painting ==
Norrie studied as a painter at the National Art School, Sydney (1972–73) and the National Gallery School, Melbourne (1974–76). In 1980 the Art Gallery of New South Wales included her in a group exhibition. In 1983 they bought one of her paintings; and the following year she was included in the 'Australian Visions: 1984 Exxon International Exhibition' at the Solomon R. Guggenheim Museum, New York.".

Her 1986 painting ‘Fête’ depicting Mickey mouse dressed as a clown won the inaugural Moët & Chandon art award affording her the opportunity to work in France, but Norrie had "an ambivalent relationship to painting". She began focusing more on using text rather than figures in her paintings (such as in her ‘Peripherique’ (1988) and ‘Room for error’ (1993) series) and then in the 1990s switched to experimenting with film as a more effective medium for her political and environmental commentary.

In 1999 she received an Australia Council Fellowship.

== Twentyfirst Century Video Work ==
During the first two decades of the 21st Century, Norrie focused on the Asia-Pacific incorporating footage of environmental and humanitarian disasters that impacted the region in large-scale video projections. Norrie's 2002 work 'Undertow' commissioned by the Melbourne Festival for the Australian Centre for Contemporary Art, was a six-screen mix of storms, dust clouds and thermal mud pools. Art critic Andrew Frost said it suggested impending global catastrophe: "Like much of Norrie's work, Undertow invoked a sense of the uncanny, produced in part from the projection of these images at great scale."

Norrie's 2003 work 'Passenger', created for the Museum of Contemporary Art Australia, juxtaposed images of New Zealand glow worm caves and insect swarms with scientific experiments and industrial ducts on six-screens. Tate curators Sook-Kyung Lee and Lena Fritsch described it saying: "Her work has addressed issues of technological advancement, natural and manmade disasters, climate change and other ecological crises, and is increasingly concerned with the conflicts between humankind and nature."

Her 2005 smaller single-channel work 'Black Wind' commissioned by the Amsterdam Sinfonietta combined indigenous descriptions of the fallout from the British nuclear tests at Maralinga and footage of the Aboriginal Tent Embassy.

She represented Australia at the 52nd Venice Biennale, 2007, with Callum Morton and Daniel von Sturmer. Her large-scale work 'Havok', commissioned by the Australia Council for the Arts, was exhibited in three rooms of the Palazzo Giustinian Lolin. The work focused on the Lusi mud volcano disaster in Indonesia that was blamed on the local gas drilling. She returned to the subject again in her 2016 work 'aftermath'. Media and communication professor Larissa Hjorth described the latter work as: "a meditative contemplation on the terrible sublime of environmental disasters in which humans, while causing such crises, have little power to control and correct."

Since then other significant exhibitions have included ZKM Center for Art and Media Karlsruhe 2008; the Edinburgh International Festival 2009, Yokohama Triennale 2011, Gemeentemuseum Den Haag 2013; Biennale of Sydney 2014; the Montreal Biennale, 2014–2015; and Ian Potter Museum of Art, University of Melbourne 2016.

== Collecting ==
In 2015 Norrie's painting 'Tall Tales and True (Pinocchio)' 1986 sold at auction for A$42,500.

Her works are in the collections of major galleries in Australia, including the Australian National Gallery, Canberra, the National Gallery of Victoria, Melbourne, and internationally at the Auckland City Art Gallery and the Solomon R. Guggenheim Museum.

A black & white portrait of Susan Norrie by Australian photographer Sonia Payes is in the collection of the Museum of Australian Photography MAPh .

== See also ==
- Australian art
