= Napier Waller =

Australian mural, mosaic and stained glass artist (1893–1972)

Napier Waller CMG OBE
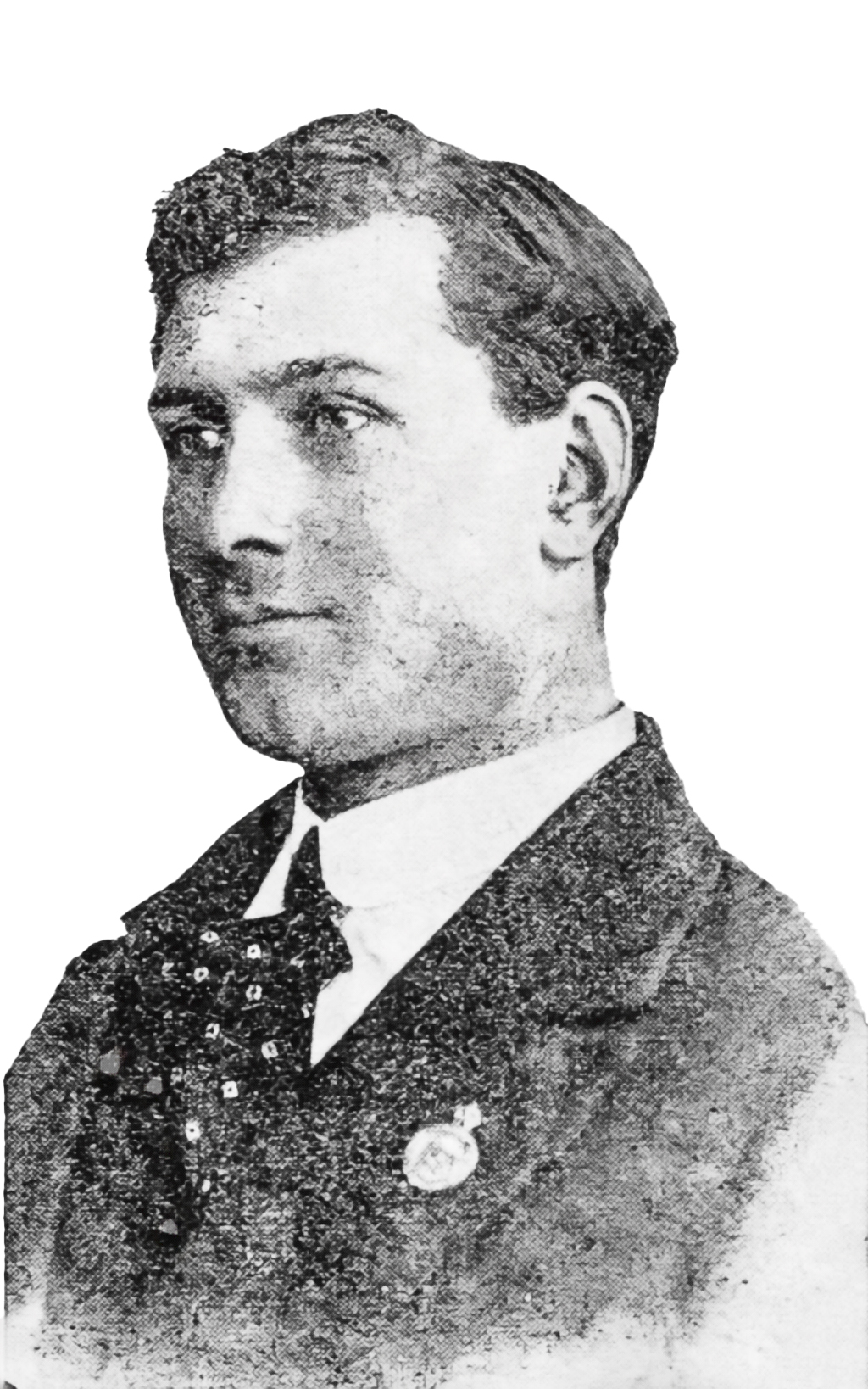
- Napier Waller in 1919
- Born: Mervyn Napier Waller; 19 June 1893; Penshurst, Victoria
- Died: 30 March 1972 (aged 78); Melbourne, Victoria
- Education: Melbourne National School of Art
- Occupations: Artist, soldier
- Known for: Mosaic murals; Stained-glass windows
- Notable work: Hall of Memory, Australian War Memorial
- Spouses: Christian Waller (m. 1915; death 1955); Lorna Reyburn (m. 1958)
- Parents: William Waller (father); Sarah Waller (mother)
- Memorials: Stained-glass windows in the Australian War Memorial
- Military career
- Allegiance: Australia
- Branch: Australian Imperial Force
- Service years: 1915–c. 1918
- Rank: Bombardier
- Service number: 20178
- Units: 111th Howitzer battery, 4th Division
- Conflicts: World War I

Waller's signature (with left hand after war injury)
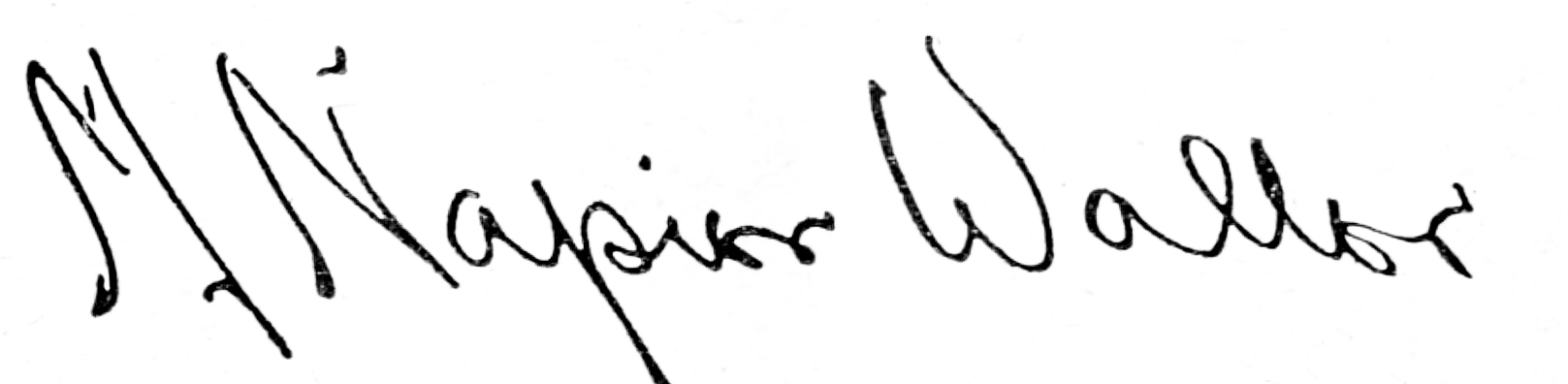

Mervyn Napier Waller CMG OBE (19 June 1893 – 30 March 1972) was an Australian muralist, mosaicist and painter in stained glass and other media. He is perhaps best known for the mosaics and stained glass for the Hall of Memory at the Australian War Memorial, Canberra, completed in 1958. However, Melbourne has been described as "a gallery of Napier Waller’s work", as eleven monumental murals by Waller are on display in the central business district and at the University of Melbourne’s main campus.

Nicholas Draffin, author of a monograph on Waller, in the Australian Dictionary of Biography, writes that his work "was strongly influenced by Pre-Raphaelite and late-nineteenth century British painters; his monumental works show an increasingly classical and calmly formal style, using timeless and heroic figure compositions to express ideas and ideals, sometimes with theosophical or gnostic overtones".

== Early life ==
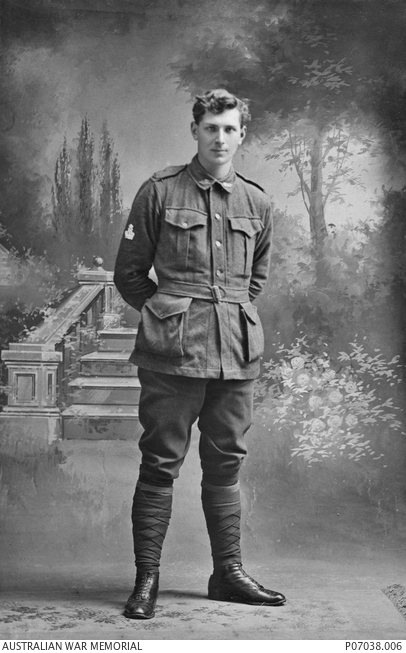
Studio portrait of 20178 Private (later Bombardier (Bdr)) Mervyn Napier Waller

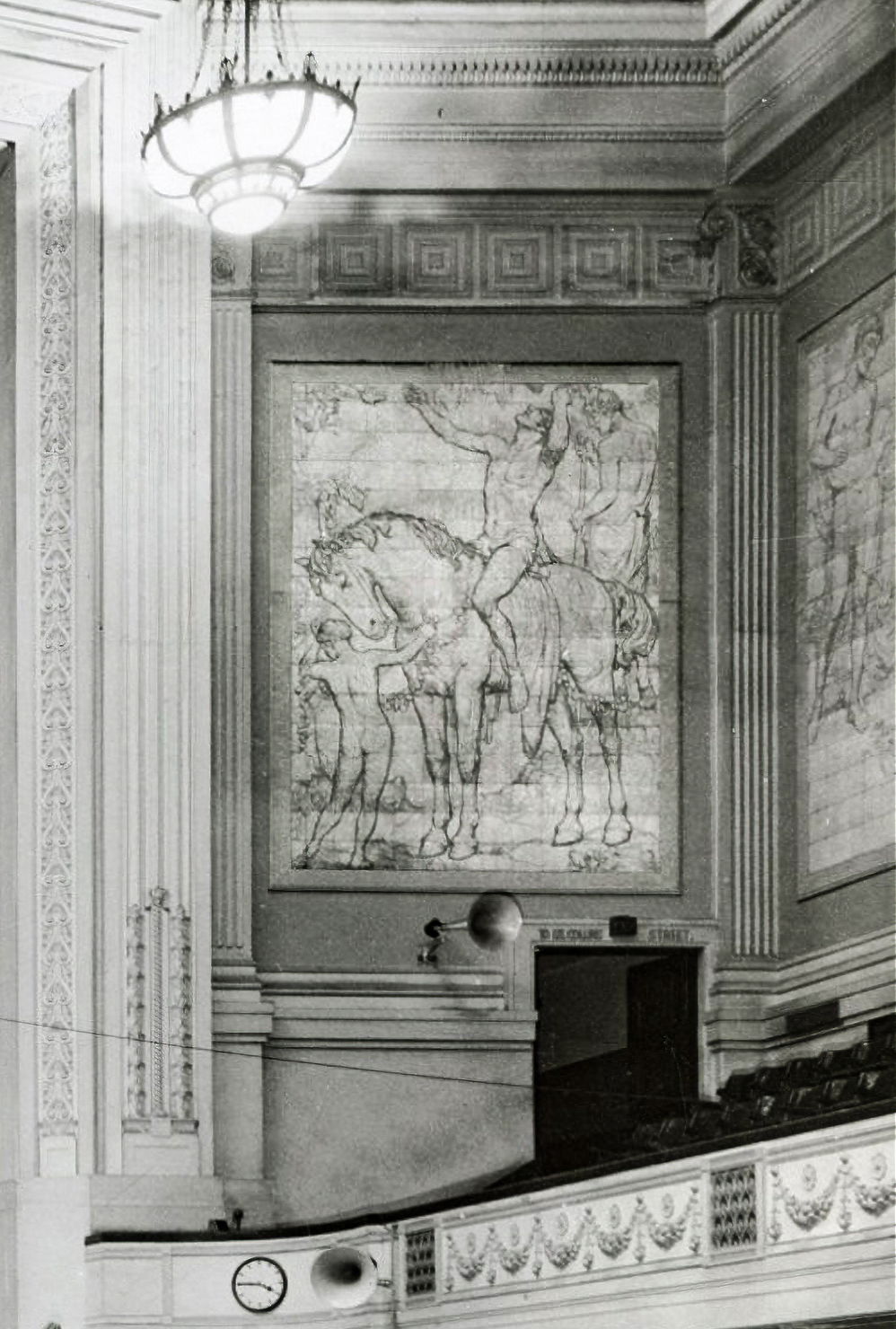
A Napier Waller mural in the Melbourne Town Hall Auditorium beside the proscenium arch, photographed c. 1940

Napier Waller was born in Penshurst, Victoria in 1893. His parents were Sarah (née Napier) and William Waller, a contractor. He left the local school aged 14 to work on his father's farm, then in 1913 began studies at the National Gallery school in Melbourne in drawing, under Frederick McCubbin, graduating to Bernard Hall's painting classes, winning ten prizes and exhibiting in 1915.

== War years ==
Waller enlisted in August 1915 in the 22nd Infantry Battalion, later being transferred to the Artillery. and in October married Christian Yandell, from Castlemaine, a fellow student who had graduated before him in 1914. He went into action in France as a bombardier in the 111th Howitzer battery of the 4th Division, Australian Imperial Force serving there from 1916 then in May 1917 at Bullecourt where he sustained wounds from an exploding artillery necessitating the amputation of his right arm. Born right-handed, he learned to use his left hand while recuperating, during which time Christian nursed him and supported them through her commercial illustration, and they spent time in Tasmania recovering from influenza acquired during the Spanish Flu epidemic.

== Career ==
On return to Melbourne in 1918 Waller illustrated Leo C. Galli's Scattered War Leaves and poet Rupert Atkinson's A Nocturne in August 1919, and in September 1919 exhibited with the Victorian Artists Society in East Melbourne as one of the five soldier artists included, with H. J. Sennett, David Barker, William McInnes and David Walker. In 1923 he exhibited a series of linocuts, being the first to make and exhibit linocuts in Australia.

=== Muralist ===
Waller's first mural design failed to win a competition in 1921. His first major mural was for the Menzies Hotel in Melbourne, in 1927. In 1927 he completed murals at the Melbourne Town Hall commissioned for £1,700 (a 2021 value of A$138,340.00) and which are classified by the National Trust as historically significant at the State level. They were painted directly, as line drawings, onto the newly installed asbestos Celotex acoustic tiles in a redecoration of the Auditorium after a fire in 1925. Given a free hand in devising the artworks he explained that the figures were not intended to be allegorical, but to create rhythm, and that line-work was used because a skin of paint would interfere with the panels' sound-absorbing quality. The actual painting on the series of 7 metre high by 4m wide wall sections from Waller's half-scale cartoons produced in his Darebin studio was undertaken by H. Oliver and Sons under the artist's supervision. The State Library of Victoria accepted his mural Peace After Victory in 1928.

=== Mosaics and stained glass ===
Waller studied mosaics in Ravenna and Venice in 1929. On his return, he worked almost exclusively in mosaic and stained glass. His major pieces during the 1930s were a monumental mosaic for the University of Western Australia, and mosaics and murals for Newspaper House (1933), the first street mosaic in Australia, and the dining hall in the Myer Emporium (1935).

He took no major commissions during World War II, but worked mainly as an illustrator then, post-war, designed and completed the mosaics and stained glass for the Hall of Memory at the Australian War Memorial, Canberra, completed in 1958.

== Teaching ==
He became senior art teacher in the Applied Art School of the Working Men's College, Melbourne (now the Royal Melbourne Institute of Technology). His students there included Loudon Sainthill.

When in 1927 Home Beautiful magazine discussed mural decoration with him and its application in Australian buildings, including private dwellings, he responded;

Mural decoration should be an architectural embellishment. It should be a complement to and in unity with the order and mood of the building. Decoration is the first essential—the quality that we expect as the initial reason for any painting. And wall decoration is as old as architecture itself; for we can easily imagine the prehistoric man playing with colored earths on the walls of his cave. There should be considerable scope in Australia for mural decoration, particularly at the present time, when we are just beginning to develop our own styles in architecture. Architects and artists must, of course, work together in such undertakings, the artist being controlled by the shape of his painting space and its surrounding architectural lines, as well as by the character of the building, its intention, its lighting, and the materials of which it is constructed. Let us remember the perfect cohesion between the painters and architects in Egypt and Assyria. How splendidly the heroic and monumental Phidias endures with the noble Parthenon’s severe beauty; then later, the change of mood producing the graceful Praxiteles and the Erechtheum.

On 6 May 1930 Waller addressed the Royal Victorian Institute of Architects on Stained Glass and Its History

Good stained glass may be summed up as a thought in colour, for to the stained-glass man, white is but another coloured light to set in the darkness. Then on the cartoon, what is needed is the planning of colour, of one colour quantity against others, of countering or repeating until the whole is ordered into a delightfully, well-balanced colour-pattern of pleasing shape; the whole should be a reposeful unity yet containing intensity and crackle. It is well that the artist should have a good knowledge of iconography and traditional symbolism. It affords him an equipment that he may mould into new decorative and architectural shapes without losing their connected meaning.

== Reception ==
In 1925, Julian Ashton writing on Waller in Art in Australia considered him the 'very antithesis' of Norman Lindsay, who was then enjoying notoriety for his erotic imagery, and rated Waller's works by comparison as "dignified; they have a certain grandeur about them; the figures suggest a statuesque nobility of character; his coloration is rich but low-toned...It pleased me to imagine this young Australian sitting with his Homer on his knee, while he dreamed of that more spacious period when no hunter might roam the woods without Arcadian adventure."

== Personal life ==
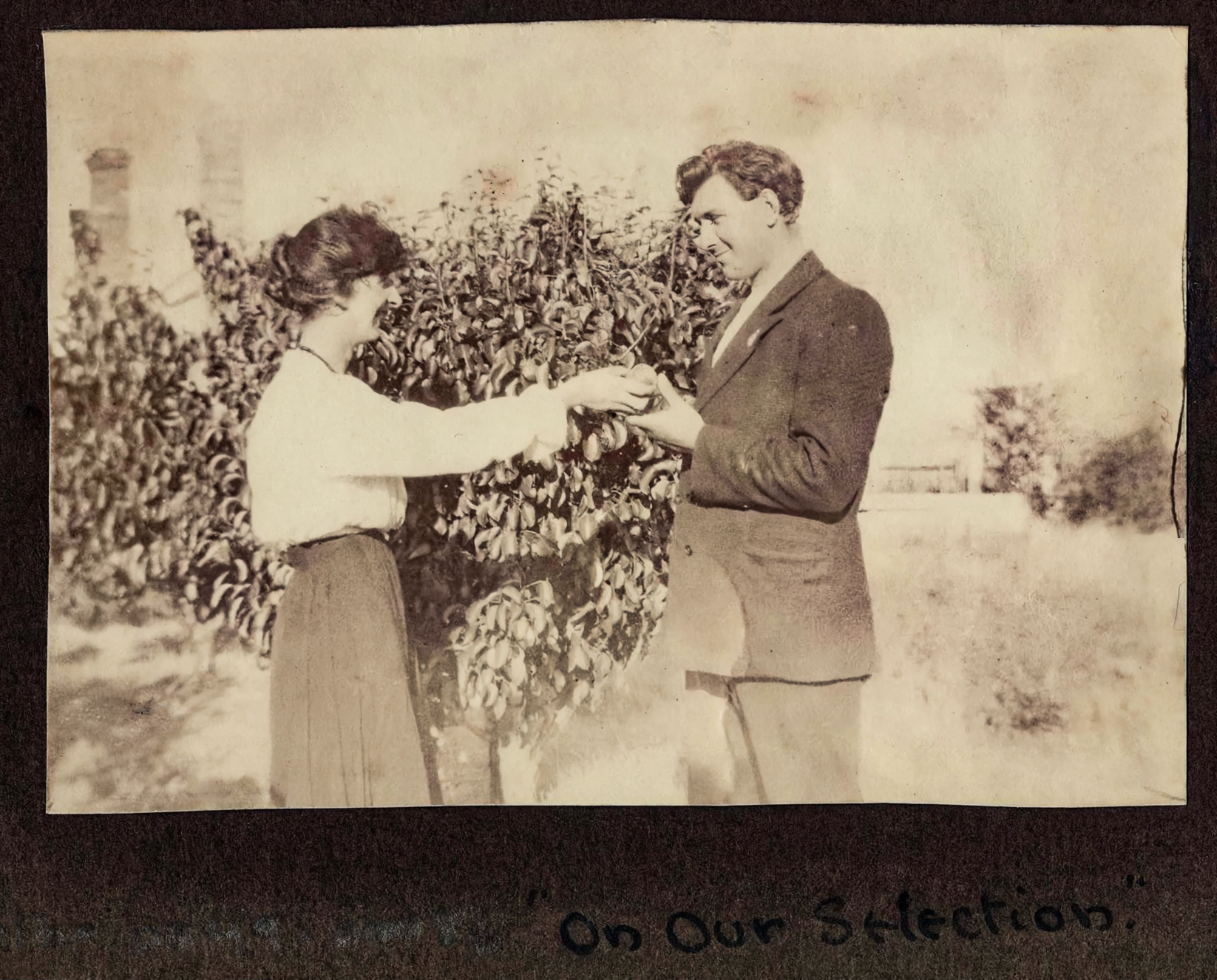
c.1920 photograph of Christian and Napier Waller with fruit tree. Card inscribed "On Our selection" under image, and on front: "Best Wishes to J. B. Trinick". Courtesy University of Melbourne Archives

=== Home ===
The Wallers' half-timbered home, completed in a mix of the Inter-war California Bungalow and Inter-war Old English styles, was constructed in the Ivanhoe precinct known as Fairy Hills by builder Phillip Millsom in 1922, through a War Services loan. Based on the artists' design and specifications, the house is lit by windows high up on a mezzanine 'minstrel gallery' above a large hall in which they entertained their friends including Percy Meldrum, architect of Newspaper House decorated with Waller's mosaic I'll put a girdle round about the earth, designed fixed furniture in a Moderne style, constructed by H. Goldman Manufacturing Co. and installed in the 1931, 1934 and 1937 alterations to the Wallers' house and studios. The house and its collection were added to the Victorian Heritage Register in recognition of its architectural, historical, and social significance; and other heritage lists. The house and its collection are managed by the Victorian branch of the National Trust; and are open to the public on the second Sunday of each month.

=== Family ===
In 1925 Christian's niece Klytie Pate came to live with them, assisted in the studio and became a significant artist and ceramicist.

In the 1930s Waller began an affair with Lorna Reyburn a New Zealand-born artist and his assistant which was discovered by his wife Christian in 1936 or 1937. Christian consequently left him in 1939, first going to America then returning to live at Ivanhoe though apart from Napier, and sometimes in her Spring Street apartment, tolerating Napier's ongoing relationship with Reyburn, before she died aged 59 of hypertensive heart disease in May 1955. In 1958 Waller subsequently married Reyburn.

Those who knew Waller described him as a modest, self-effacing man of considerable erudition which could be attributed to his love of literature begun as a child, especially of Thomas Malory and William Morris; during WW1 he read James Macpherson and in the 1920s he read Homer and Virgil.

=== Honours ===
Napier Waller was appointed an Officer (OBE) of the Order of the British Empire in 1953 and a Companion (CMG) of the Order of St Michael and St George in 1959.

== Legacy ==
Waller died in 1972, in Melbourne and his widow Lorna arranged for the preservation of the Waller House through her will, which specified that her trustees establish it as a centre for the study of monumental art in Australia and prevent the sale or disposal of any artworks and artefacts kept there. The grounds, building and the collection housed in it have been classified by the National Trust as a World Heritage site;

...significant as the creation and home of nationally renowned artists [who] together [...] designed the house and much of its interior decoration and furnishings. Waller also lived there for fifty years. The house and contents are intact. Waller's studios, examples of his art and items connected with his work remain as he left them (Criterion H.1). Architecturally the house design is innovative in its internal use of space, specifically in the organisation of the studio/living room and displays a high degree of artistic creativity in the interior decoration (Criterion F.1).

The house is under the custodianship of the National Trust of Australia.

A bronze plaque beside Waller Road (Mount Rouse Tourist Road), Mount Rouse overlooking Penshurst was placed, in commemoration of Waller, by Shire President, Shire of Mount Rouse T. D. Hutton in August, 1991.

== Major works ==
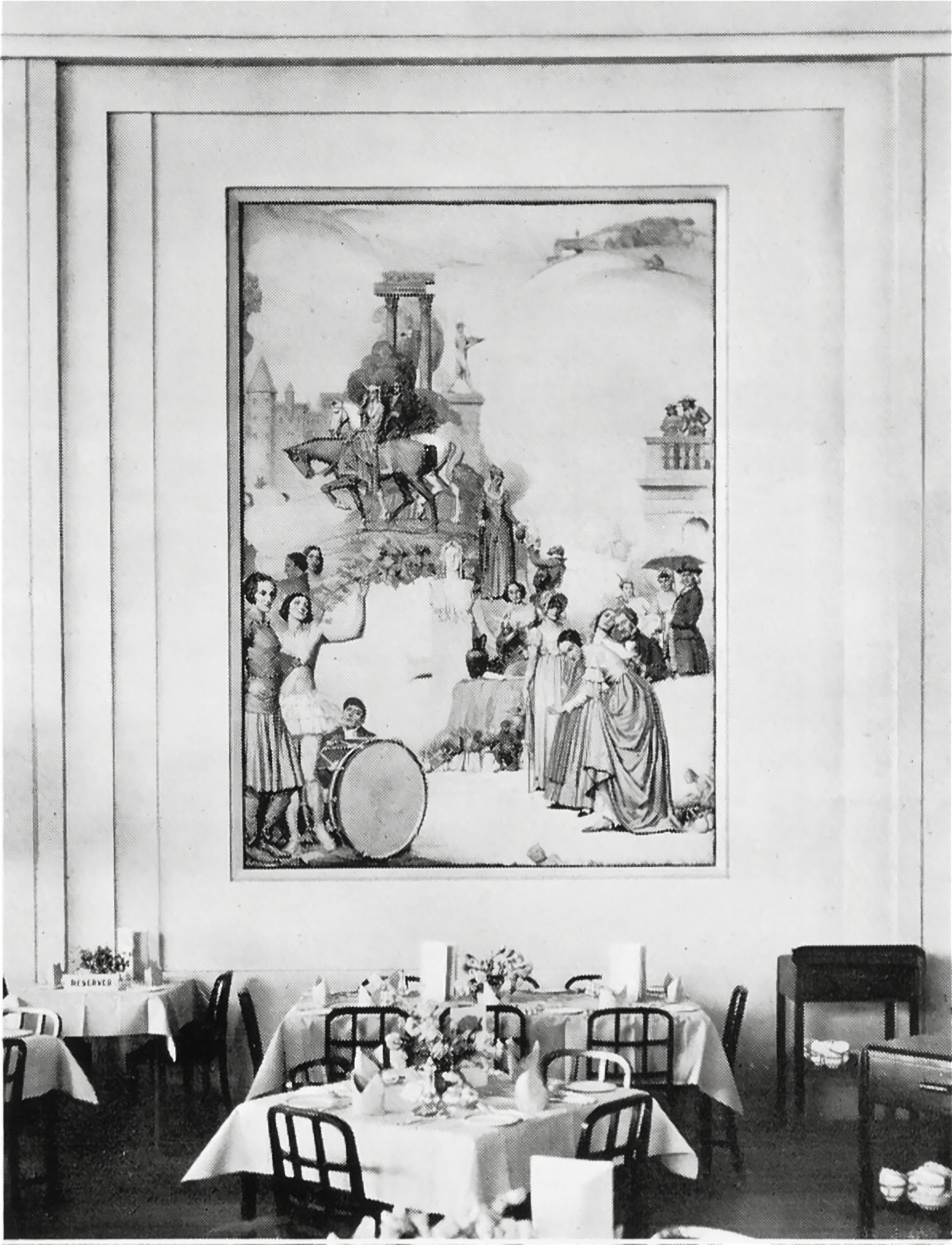
Napier Waller mural (1933) Women in Literature, Dining Room, Myer Emporium

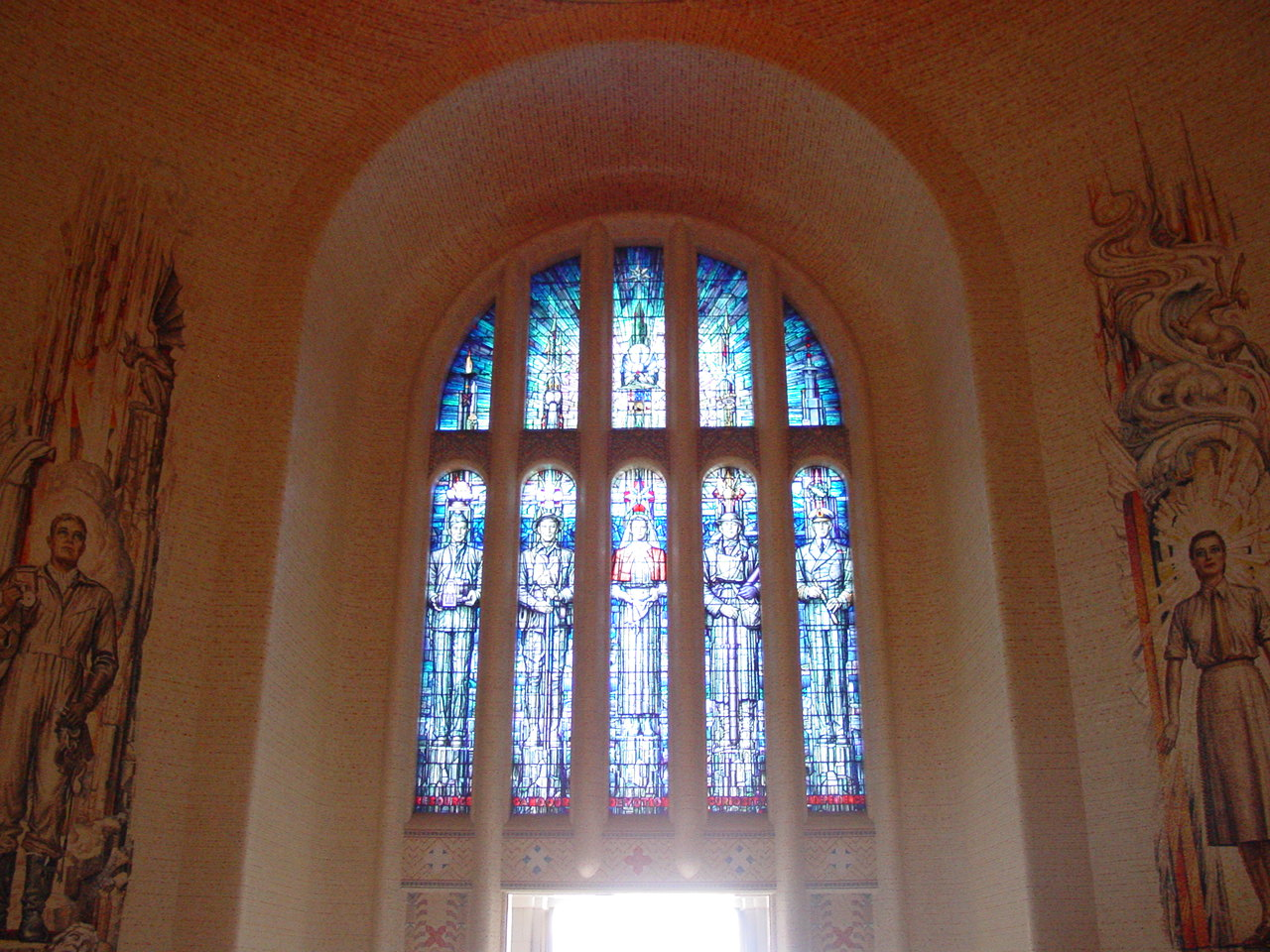
Australian War Memorial, towards the entrance of the Hall of Memory, from within.

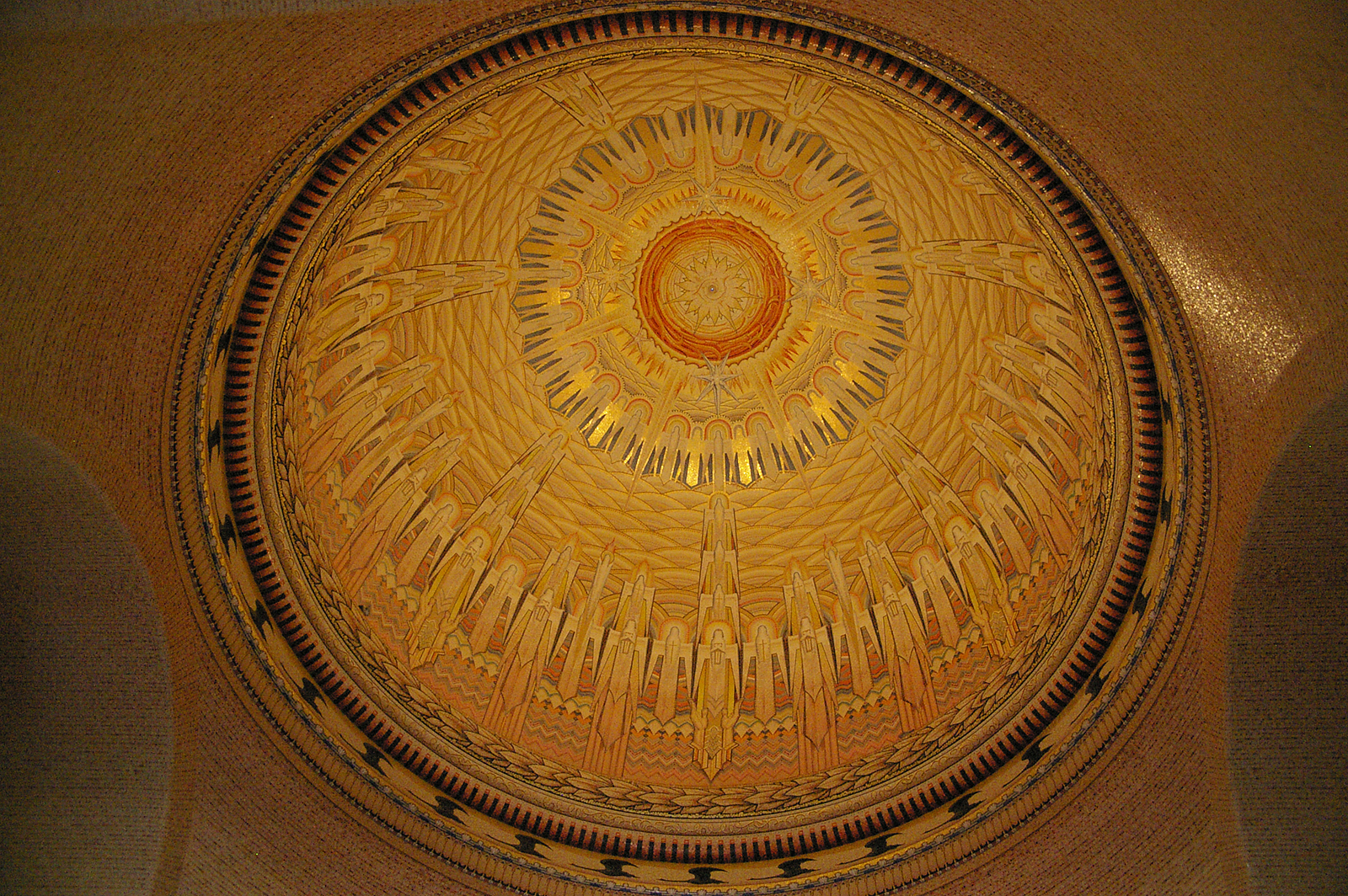
Detail of the dome from inside the Hall of Memory.

- 1926: linocut The Man in Black (a self-portrait, showing him with both arms intact)
- 1927: mural for the Menzies Hotel, Melbourne (the building was demolished in 1969, and the mural was sold privately)
- 1927: murals at the Melbourne Town Hall
- 1928: mural Peace After Victory, State Library of Victoria (1928)
- 1928: stained glass window, south window, Wilson Hall, Melbourne University destroyed in the Wilson Hall fire of 1952)
- 1928: mural Better Than to Squander Life’s Gifts is to Conserve Them and Ensure a Fearless Future, T&G Life Building, Collins and Russell Sts, Melbourne
- 1931: mosaic The Five Lamps of Knowledge, Great Gate, Winthrop Hall, University of Western Australia
- 1933: mosaic I’ll Put a Girdle Around the Earth, Newspaper House, Collins St, Melbourne
- 1934: murals at the Florentino Restaurant, Bourke St, Melbourne (now Grossi Restaurant); executed by four of his students under his supervision.
- 1935: stained glass window, Wesley Church, Lonsdale St, Melbourne
- 1935: stained glass window, Wilson Hall, University of Melbourne (hall gutted by fire 1952, then demolished, but the window survived, and is now the Leckie Window in foyer of the Ian Potter Museum of Art)
- 1933: mural Women through the ages for the dining hall in the Myer Emporium, Bourke St, Melbourne
- 1937: stained glass window, Orchid Window, Botany School, University of Melbourne
- 1955: stained glass window, St Mark's Anglican Church, Camberwell
- 1940: mural Australian Symbolic Figures, Royal Insurance Co, Collins St, Melbourne (the building was demolished in 1969 and the mural was donated to the Architecture School at the University of Melbourne, where it is on display in the architecture library)
- 1958: mosaics and stained glass for the Hall of Memory at the Australian War Memorial, Canberra
- 1960: three stained glass windows for The Armidale School War Memorial Assembly Hall, Armidale NSW
- 1962: mural "Pioneer Chapel Memorial", St Andrew's Church, Brighton, Melbourne
- 1963: mural The Eight Aboriginal Tribal Headmen (Temple Court foyer, Collins St, Melbourne, feared lost when an arcade put through in c1990, however, during renovations of a front shop in 2003 it was rediscovered, and reported to be displayed once more, but a new wall built in front instead)
- 1967: mosaic Prometheus (Monash House foyer, William St, Melbourne, recently restored)
- portrait in oils of his friend and near-neighbour Norman Macgeorge held by University of Melbourne

== Bibliography ==
- Draffin, Nicholas, “The Art of M. Napier Waller”
