= Mary Card =

Australian designer and educator

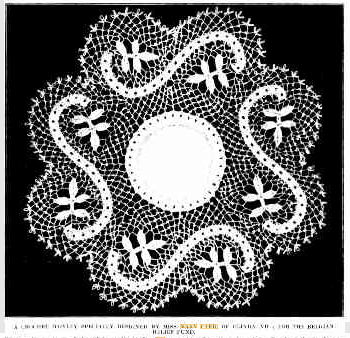
A "doyley" designed by Mary Card for the Belgian Relief Fund, from a 1915 publication.

Mary Card (24 September 1861 – 13 October 1940) was an Australian needlework designer and educator.

== Early life ==
Mary Card, born in Castlemaine, Victoria, was the eldest of twelve children born to David Card, a jeweller and watchmaker, and Harriet Card (née Watson-Wooldridge), an actress.

Mary's secondary education at The Ladies College of the Presbyterian Church in Melbourne (now called Presbyterian Ladies' College, Melbourne) was followed by a year at the National Gallery of Victoria Art School in Melbourne.

== Career ==
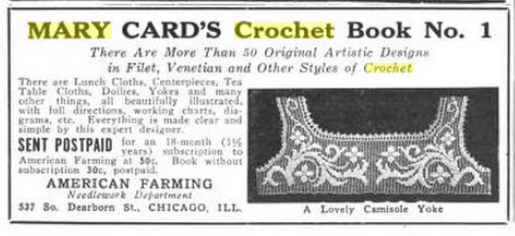
Advertisement for Mary Card's Crochet Book No. 1, from a 1921 publication.

In 1903 deafness forced Mary to sell the school she had begun in 1889.

She published several short stories in The Australasian newspaper (later Australasian Post) but was unable to make a living.

She instead began learning needlework, with intentions to become a professional designer and teacher. She gained experience by refurbishing Irish crochet lace when it returned to fashion in the early 1900s. Her first designs were published, anonymously, in the prestigious American Ladies Home Journal.

In 1910, patterns bearing her name were featured in the Melbourne magazine, New Idea, later renamed Everylady's Journal and in a series of books.

Her designs were known for including Australian plants and animals, rather than the traditional English flora and fauna.

Her first chart, the Wild Rose & Pigeon Supper cloth, was released in 1917. During this time she also sold crochet hooks, thread and the transfers for some of her designs directly to the public.

== America, England and Australia ==
In 1918 at the age of 57, Mary moved to New York.

Needlecraft magazine issued more than 100 of her designs, including the Statue of Liberty and the American flag. Another magazine, Modern Priscilla, showed illustrations of her Grapevine & Silvereye designs and supplied the charts by mail order. The book of crochet patterns in fine thread she self-published was later re-issued by Needlecraft.

She prepared a book of jackets and jumpers in coarse thread for the Dexter Yarn Company.

In the mid-1920s she moved to England, and built a home in rural Berkshire. The English countryside and gardens inspired many of her later designs. She began a new series of English Charts, continued with Needlecraft in America until 1935 and issued 29 designs from 1931 to 1939 in Australian Home Beautiful. The later charts carried endorsements for Coats Mercer Crochet® cotton and Old Bleach Linen®.

Some of her previously published work was included in the Semco Crochet Book issued by a needlework supply company in Melbourne in about 1933. Australian friends who visited Mary in England told her first biographer, Barbara Jefferis, that she also designed for the London firm Weldon and Co who issued the popular Weldon's Practical Needlework and other fashion and needlework publications. Weldon, along with the other English needlework magazines, did not disclose the names of the designers. However, a few of the Weldon designs with features of her work are in a recent book which brings together all her afternoon tea cloths. She spent most of the last years of her life in England, occasionally returning to Australia. She was with her sister Harriet at Olinda, Victoria when she died on 13 October 1940.

== Achievements ==
Mary's designs spanned different mediums. Her spreadsheets, containing more than 400 designs, demonstrate various patterns used in her wider artistic practise. She was particularly known for her filet or picture crochet. Mary also served as a teacher of techniques.

Mary was an active Secretary of her district's Patriotic League during World War I. She also helped people with speech and hearing difficulties before she closed her school.

== Patterns ==
An extensive collection of her patterns is available online. Mary's ten books, more than 30 of her charts, selected magazine articles and as series of spreadsheets are in a high resolution Digital Collection which may be downloaded without charge. Many other designs are in six books on her life and work. Further details including illustrations and descriptions of crochet lace techniques accompany some of the rewritten patterns in these books. A few early patterns not available online are in Everylady's Journal and New Idea held by the State Library Victoria. Details, including page numbers are in the spreadsheets. Many of her patterns were published in at least two of the three countries in which she worked.

== Recognition of her Contribution to the Social Life of the Nation ==
Mary has been acknowledged in various ways: Obituaries in three Melbourne daily papers, The Age, The Argus and The Herald (Sun), the Australian Home Beautiful magazine and the New York Times. She is listed in the Australian Dictionary of Biography. The home she built at Olinda on the outskirts of Melbourne is heritage listed. A street has been named after her in Gungahlin, a suburb of Canberra. She was included along with 40 other needlewomen and designers in a comprehensive work on 500 Australian women artists.
