= Clare J. Cascarret =

Australian scrap metal dealer (1902–1977)

Clare Josephine Cascarret
- Cascarret in 1976
- Born: 1902; Minyip, Victoria, Australia
- Died: 8 April 1977 (aged 74–75); Mount Eliza, Victoria, Australia
- Occupations: businessperson, councillor
- Spouses: Alfred Percy Withers; Jean Cascarret
- Parent: Marie Dalley

Clare Josephine Cascarret (c.1902 – 1977) was an Australian scrap metal dealer and the first woman city councillor in Melbourne.

== Life ==
Cascarret was born in about 1902 in the town of Minyip in the state of Victoria. Her biological mother was Marie (Ma) Dalley who, in time, traded as a scrap metal dealer. Her mother had been born Minnie Mary Fimmel and she had married John Thomas Francis Moroney in 1897. Her widowed mother reinvented herself as Marie Dalley Her mother was a workaholic entrepreneur who went from unskilled work to owning a hardware business by 1914.

Cascarret went to school and then she went to work with her mother. In 1925 her mother started, M. Dalley & Co. Pty Ltd, one of Australia's largest dealers in scrap metal. She and her mother would provide accommodation for visiting sailors and they would buy food and give it away in Melbourne. Four years later Cascarret married a garage manager named Alfred Percy Withers at the Congregational church in Bourke Street in February 1929 in Sydney.

In January 1949 her second marriage was to a French seaman named Jean Cascarret following her divorce in 1948. She and her sister Ida became the joint managing directors of the company their mother had founded and Jean was employed by the company.

Her mother died in 1965 and Cascarret and her sister went to court unsuccessfully to contest the status of the company's employee shares. She tried three times to be elected to Kew City Council and in 1966 she stood unsuccessfully for election to Melbourne City Council, but in the following year she tried again in Hotham where there was the only one other candidate. She pledged improved school crossings, kindergartens and an olympic-sized swimming pool for the local park. She became the first woman councillor in the 125 year history of Melbourne's council. The election was said to have cost her over half a million pounds. In 1968 some of her supporters were convicted of election fraud, but she survived the scandal.

Cascarret was involved with the Australian Local Government Women’s Association and on the committee of the Melbourne Ladies Benevolent Society. which had looked after the poor since 1845.

Cascarret died in the Melbourne suburb of Mount Eliza in 1977.
