= James Flett =

Australian painter and graphic artist (1906–1986)

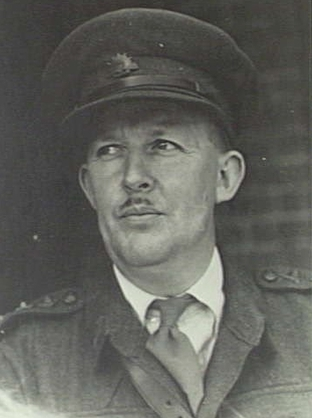
- Born: 9 May 1906; Dunolly
- Died: 1986 (aged 79–80)
- Alma mater: National Gallery of Victoria Art School
- Occupation: Drawer, painter, writer

James Edward Flett (9 May 1906 – 3 October 1986) was an Australian painter and author, remembered for fanciful watercolors, large linocut prints, and for histories of Victorian goldfields.

== History ==
Flett was born in Dunolly, Victoria to Elizabeth Harris Flett and her husband James Allan Flett. He studied painting 1927–1928 by night classes at the NGV School, where he was noted for being hard-working and conscientious, winning most of the available prizes for student work. He produced a large number of paintings, mostly watercolors influenced by Blamire Young and Norman Lindsay, on a variety of themes including pirates and fairies, but including many portraits.

Flett was fortunate in having a wealthy admirer, P. M. Stanley, sponsor a study trip to Britain and Europe. In March 1932, before he left, he exhibited the whole of his work, some 100 pieces, in the dining room of an old Melbourne hotel on Little Collins Street, prior the works going on sale. The Herald's art critic found much to admire. He returned to Australia disillusioned as to his future as an artist, deciding instead to devote his energies to local history research and publication. He produced several watercolor portraits; those of his father and mother receiving high praise.

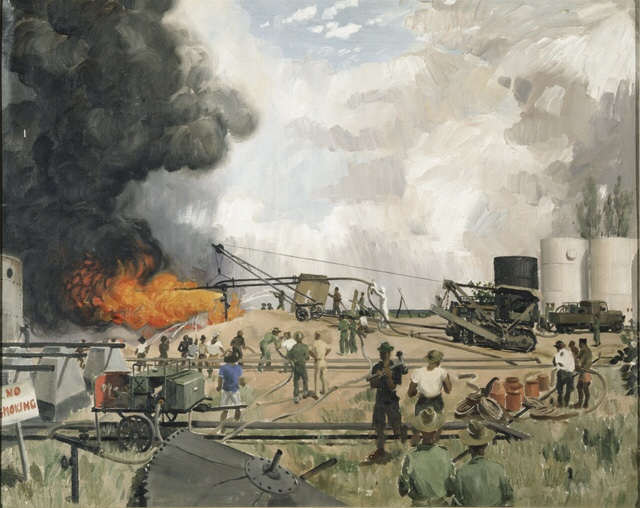
Putting out the oil fire, Seria. 1945 by James Fleet

In March 1945, on the recommendation of Harold Herbert, Flett was commissioned as an official war artist and attached to the Australian Military History Section. He spent the remainder of the war on Morotai and Brunei, creating detailed sketches and photographing activities of the 2/28th Battalion and the 20th Brigade as a basis for future studio paintings.

== Collections ==
Works by Flett are held by the National Gallery of Victoria; Australian War Memorial, Canberra; and the Castlemaine Art Gallery and Historical Museum.

== Publications ==
- James Flett (1931). Pirates. Frank C. Johnson.
- James Flett (1956). Dunolly – Story of an Old Gold Diggings. Poppet Head Press. ISBN 0959717331.
- James Flett (1970). The History of Gold Discovery in Victoria. Hawthorn Press.
- James Flett (1975). Maryborough Victoria: Goldfields History. Poppet Head Press. ISBN 0959717307.
- James Flett (1977). A Pictorial History of the Victorian Goldfields. Rigby, Adelaide.
- James Flett (1979). Old Pubs. Hawthorn Press.
