= Ma Dalley =

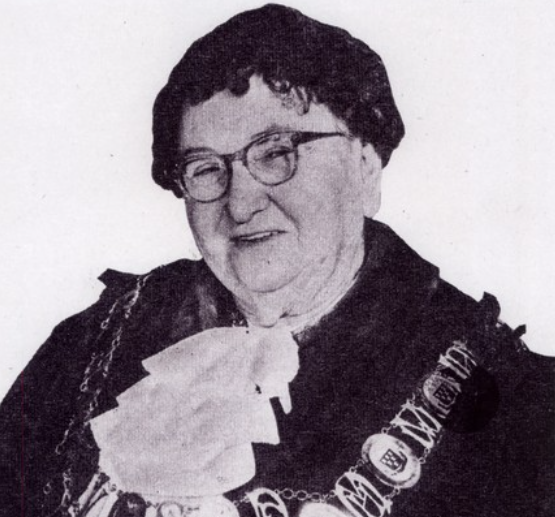
- 1954 - Mayor of Kew
- Born: Minnie May Fimmel; 4 June 1880; Minyip
- Died: 8 May 1965 (aged 84); Kew
- Other names: Marie Dalley
- Occupations: businessperson and mayor
- Predecessor: ASG Stevens
- Spouse: John Moroney
- Children: two

Marie Dalley known as Ma Dalley born as Minnie May Fimmel (1880 – 1965) was an Australian businesswoman, philanthropist and mayor.

== Life ==
Dalley was born in 1880 in Victoria state in Minyip. She was named Minnie May Fimmel by her parents Matilda (born Baum) and Carl Heinrich Fimmel. They had both been born in Germany.

She married John Thomas Francis Moroney in 1897 and she had two daughters, Ida and Clare. She reinvented herself as Marie Dalley and she was a widow. She worked hard for long hours to gather enough money to become a businessperson. In 1905 she had two jobs. She was employed to pack tea during the day and at other times Dalley was making bags. For every thousand bags she made she was paid fourpence. One of her early business deals was to make £50 buying fire damaged mouth organs and from each of these she then extracted a small piece of valuable lead. She repaired fire damaged chairs and after she sold the first six she was in profit with 294 chairs still to sell. Dalley owned a hardware business by 1914 on Elizabeth Street, Melbourne with a small loan.

The business she was most associated with, was scrap metal dealing. In 1925 she established the company at Bedford Street in North Melbourne. She covered her three acres of land with a chaotic mixture of old equipment and second hand hardware which she bought and sold. M. Dalley & Company became one of the leading scrap dealers in Australia. Others benefitted from her business, the industrialist, Ralph McKay, bought a boiler from her and John Derham bought a lot of used machinery which enabled him to start Victoria's first plastic company, Australian Moulding Corporation, in 1927. Visy was also launched with a corrugating machine made from equipment sourced from Dalley's yard in the 1940s.

During the 1940s food was rationed in Britain. Dalley became involved in several initiatives. She was buying unripe fruit and vegetables which was then stored after its temperature was lowered. This allowed the fruit to be ripened to order for canning. By 1946 she was exporting the frozen meat of 20,000 lambs to the United Kingdom, she bought a farm and she was also involved in the manufacture of margarine.

Dalley was painted by James William Govett after she elected to be the mayor of Kew in 1954. Kew had a mayor for 94 years before she was elected, but she was the first woman. Money was set aside to celebrate her election but Dalley instructed that the money should be given to Kew's St George's Hospital. Dalley later made a personal donation to the hospital of £250,000.

Dalley died in Kew in 1965. Her archives are held by the State of Victoria.
