= Montagu Marks =

Australian artist

Montagu Marks (1890–1972) was an Australian artist.

He was born in Melbourne in 1890, moved to Perth in 1896 and later studied at the National Gallery School at Melbourne.

During World War I he was a pilot in the Canadian Royal Flying Corps (RFC). After the war he was General Manager of London Film Productions. He was posted to Spain in World War II to help Britain's propaganda effort to keep Spain from joining the Axis powers.

He married fellow Australian artist Stella Lewis Marks MVO at Chelsea Town Hall in 1911. He was a friend of Sidney Reilly, the 'Ace of Spies', whom he met as a fellow officer in the Canadian RFC.

He initiated the connection between Sir Alexander Korda and the Prudential enabling the building of Denham Film Studios. He traveled to Ceylon (Sri Lanka), Australia and New Zealand in 1937/1938 to promote London Films across the Empire and review the possibility of setting up a permanent studio in Australia.

He was one of the key people involved in the Anglo-American film production company 'Fairbanks International', which collapsed due to Douglas Fairbanks Sr.'s death in 1939.

After World War II he was involved in film production with Mike Frankovich.

He retired and returned to his paintings. He died at Norton Court, Kent, England, in 1972.
