= Klytie Pate =

Australian artist (1912–2010)

Klytie Pate OAM
- Born: Clytie Winifred Wingfield Sclater; 20 October 1912; Melbourne, Victoria
- Died: 10 June 2010 (aged 97); Prahran, Victoria, Australia
- Education: National Gallery of Victoria Art School, Melbourne Technical College now known as RMIT University
- Known for: Pottery
- Movement: Australiana
- Spouse: William Pate
- Awards: Medal of the Order of Australia

Klytie Pate OAM (20 October 1912 – 10 June 2010) was an Australian studio potter who emerged as an innovator in the use of unusual glazes and the extensive incising, piercing and ornamentation of earthenware pottery. She was one of a small group of Melbourne art potters which included Marguerite Mahood and Reg Preston who were pioneers in the 1930s of ceramic art nationwide. Her early work was strongly influenced by her aunt, the artist and printmaker, Christian Waller.

== Early life ==
Clytie Winifred Wingfield Sclater (later Klytie Pate) was born in Melbourne in 1912. Her father remarried when she was 13, so Klytie went to live with her aunt, Christian and her husband Napier Waller encouraged her interest in art and printmaking. She spent time at their studio in Ivanhoe, and thus her work reflected Art Deco, Art Nouveau, The Pre Raphaelites, Egyptian art, Greek mythology, and Theosophy. Pate made several plaster masks that were displayed by the Wallers in their home and experimented with linocut, a medium used by Christian in her printmaking. Her aunt further encouraged Klytie by arranging for her to study modelling under Ola Cohn, the Melbourne sculptor.

In 1931, at the age of 19, Klytie studied painting and drawing at the National Gallery of Victoria Art School under William Beckwith McInnes and Charles Arthur Wheeler. In 1933 Klytie took classes at the School of Applied Art at Melbourne Technical College now known as RMIT University. She studied figure drawing and applied art under her uncle, Napier Waller, modelling under George Allen, and pottery under John Knight and Gladys Kelly. Her environment, her unusual talent, her training, and her drive started Klytie on a path to recognition which increased as time went on. Klytie was also surrounded by the flora and fauna of Australia, and its unique shapes and colours. As a young woman she loved taking trips to the bush, visiting the Mornington Peninsula, and the Dandenongs with groups of friends.

== Pre War years ==
In a drawing class at RMIT she met William Pate, who was to become a graphic designer and painter. They married in 1937, and built a weekend cottage at Montrose on the side of Mount Dandenong, an area that then teemed with bush animals and birds- favoured subjects of her pots. The cottage was called "Joliwynds".

Klytie strongly demonstrated the influence of "Australiana" during that period with lyre birds, kangaroos and native flowers incised into her pottery.

== Post war ==
In 1941 Klytie held her first solo exhibition of pottery at the Kozminsky Gallery in Melbourne. She continued to exhibit regularly for the next 50 years. She taught at Melbourne Technical College until 1945, when she was then able to pursue pottery full-time. The Pates lived in a flat on the Punt Road hill, where her studio was located. In 1947, Klytie, together with Alan Lowe, became the first ceramicists to have their studio pottery purchased by the National Gallery of Victoria. In 1983 Pate was the first woman in her particular field for which a retrospective was held at the National Gallery of Victoria. In 2008 she was the sole living Australian artist featured included in the Art Deco exhibition held at NGV.

"Beleura", on the Mornington Peninsula, is a historic house managed by the National Trust of Australia, Victoria, where Klytie's pottery is displayed throughout. Her work was collected by John Tallis, who owned Beleura and was a personal friend of the Pates. Following his death the Tallis family and Foundation continued to add to the collection of Klytie's pottery.

== The potter ==
Klytie Pate’s pots take form in numerous shapes and sizes. Over the years she managed to produce a staggering amount of pottery, much of which is distributed in private collections across Australia, which makes it difficult to grasp the scope of her work. Even so, galleries often had to wait for an opportunity to exhibit her work as she became better known. She made lidded jars, large bowls and vases, lamp bases, jugs, animals and birds, large decorated plates, wall tiles, tea sets and mugs. Klytie went through different periods where she concentrated on a certain colour glaze, shape, or theme in the production of her pots. However, notably, apart from sets of cups and saucers, no two pieces are the same.

Making pottery was a process that Klytie carried out from beginning to end. Careful in the clay she selected, in more recent years she worked from a home studio.

In 1991 Klytie was awarded the Order of Australia, for service to the Arts, particularly ceramic art and sculpture.

In honour of Klytie Pate’s contribution to the artform of ceramics, the Klytie Pate Award for Ceramics was formed and is a national prize, open to all ceramicists in Australia and New Zealand. The 2023 biennial prize was valued at $10,000. Ceramicists who have been finalists in the previous awards include: Csongvay Blackwood, Pie Bolton, Greg Daly, Cathy Franzi, Minna Graham and Steph Wallace.

== Gallery and museum collections ==
- National Gallery of Victoria, Melbourne, VIC:
- City of Ballarat Fine Art Gallery, Ballarat, VIC
- Beleura, National Trust of Australia, Mornington, VIC
- National Museum of Australia, Canberra, NSW
- The Powerhouse Museum, Sydney, NSW
- Shepparton Art Museum, Shepparton, VIC
