= Madeline Lewellin =

Australian artist (1854–1944)

- Born: Madeline Mary Ravenna Lewellin; 1854
- Died: 24 November 1944 (aged 89–90); Hampton, Victoria, Australia
- Other names: M. M. R. Lewellin
- Education: National Gallery School
- Known for: Painting
- Awards: Silver Medal, Victorian Intercolonial Exhibition of Wine Grain Fruit etc

Madeline Mary Ravenna Lewellin (1854 – 24 November 1944) was an Australian artist and botanical collector.

== Biography ==
Lewellin was born in 1854 in Victoria to Dr John Henry Hill Lewellin, a physician, and Grace Elizabeth (née Danneby). She was one of five daughters, and the family lived in Prahran. Lewellin's brother, Captain Herbert Gordon Hill Lewellin, was a commander in the P. and O. fleet.

She studied painting at the National Gallery School in 1879 under Eugene von Guerard.

Lewellin was known for collecting and painting specimens, and became a member of the Field Naturalists Club of Victoria in 1885. In 1884 she won a silver medal for her studies of fungi. She collected plants for Australian botanist Ferdinand von Mueller, and the variety of Dicrastylis lewellinii (Purple sand-sage) is named after her.

Her recreation of a known painting Cattle in Storm was said to "place upon her canvas almost the same expression of wildness, terror and amazement in the faces and eyes of the beasts as appear on the original."

== Selected works ==
Watercolours by M. M. R. Lewellin
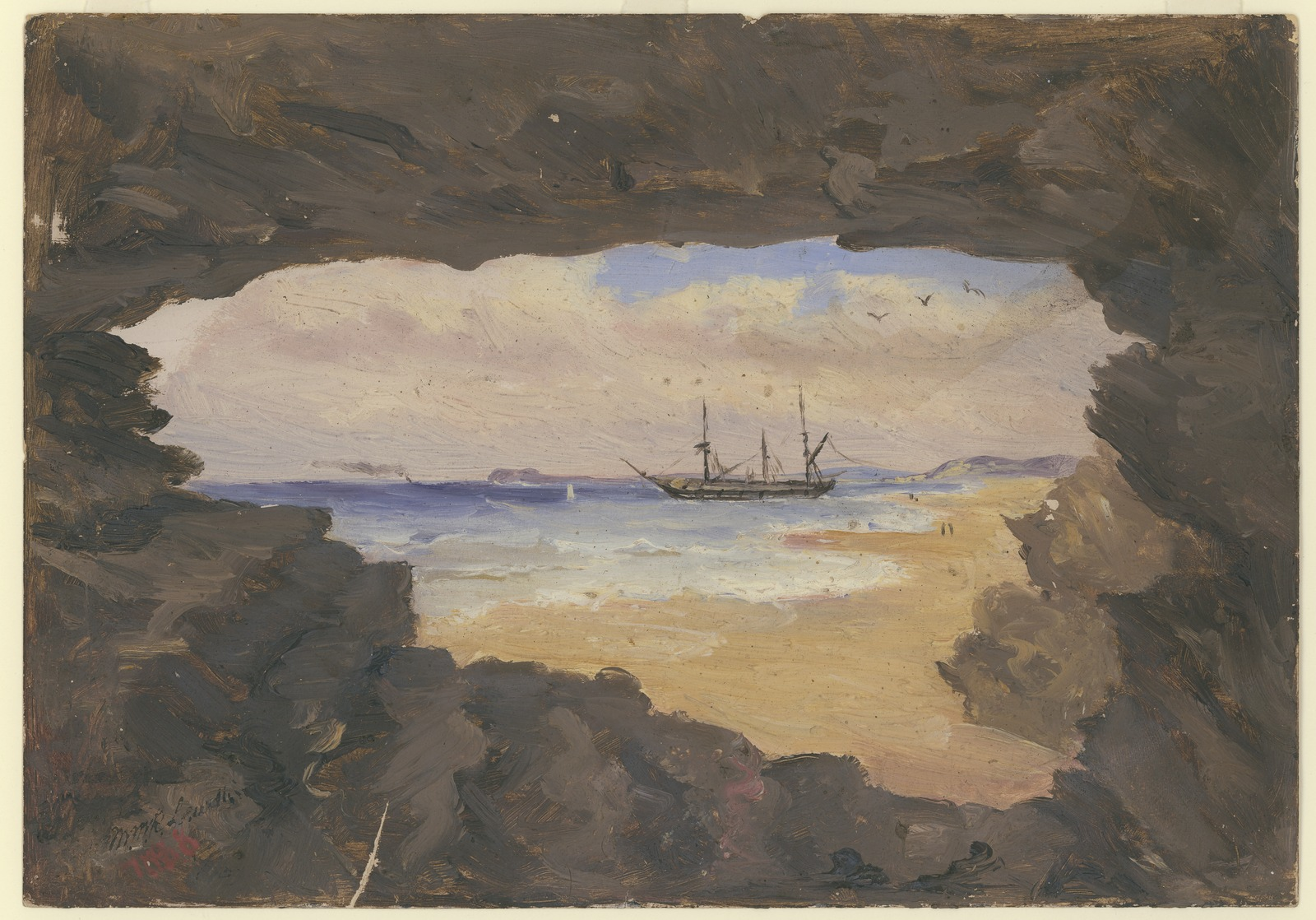
Wreck of the Glaneuse, 1888

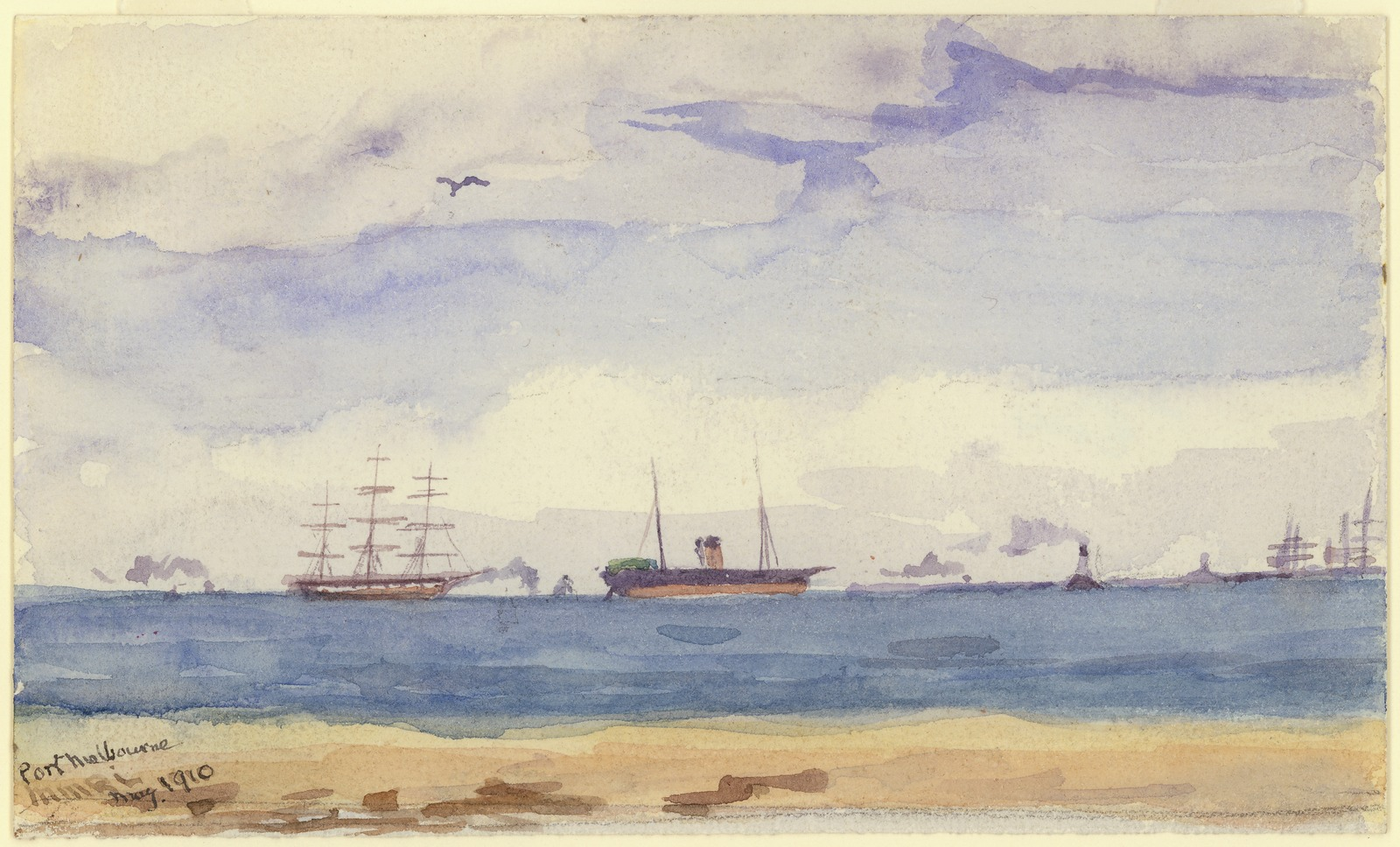
Port Melbourne, 1910

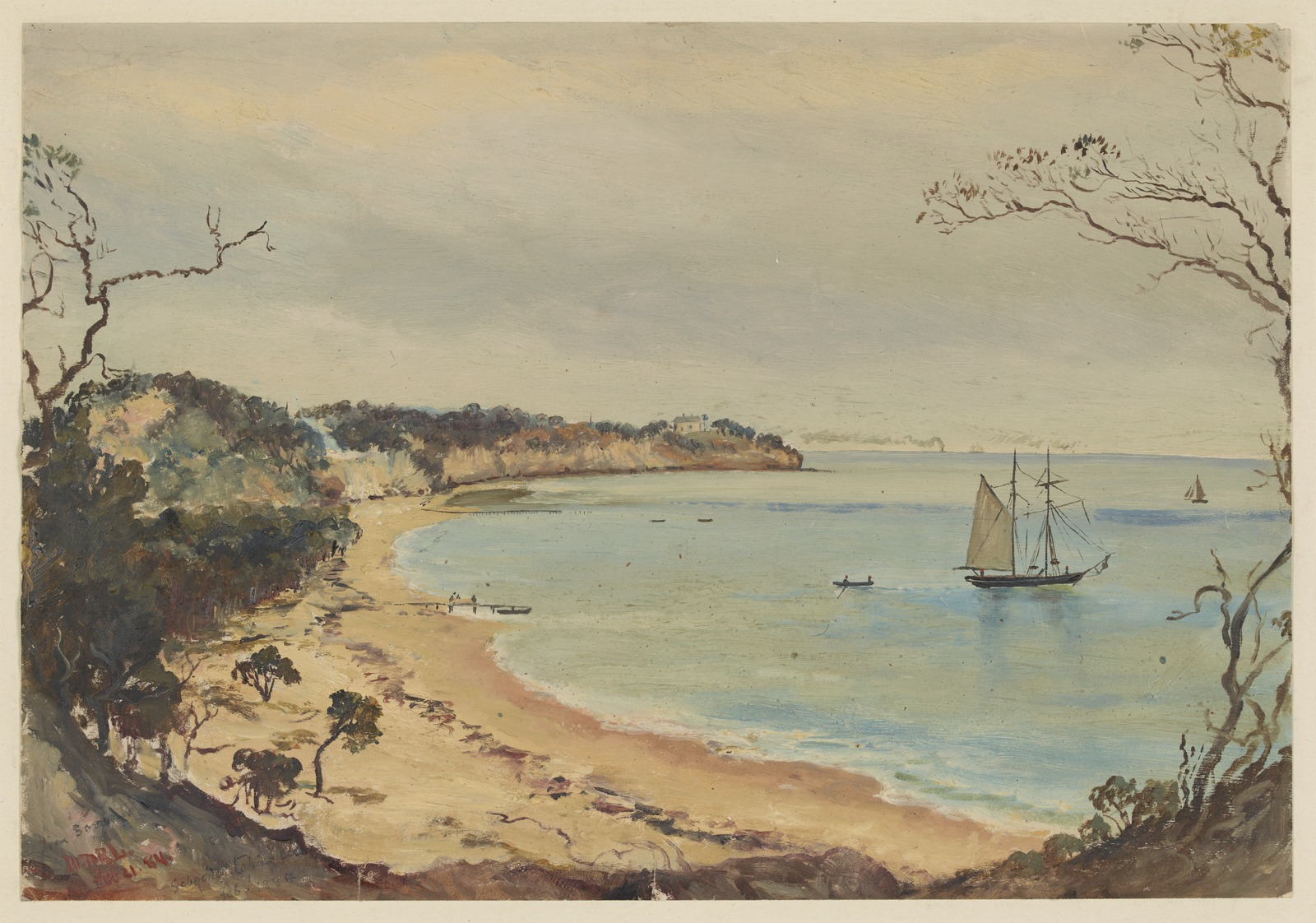
From Sorrento, schooner taking leave, 1884

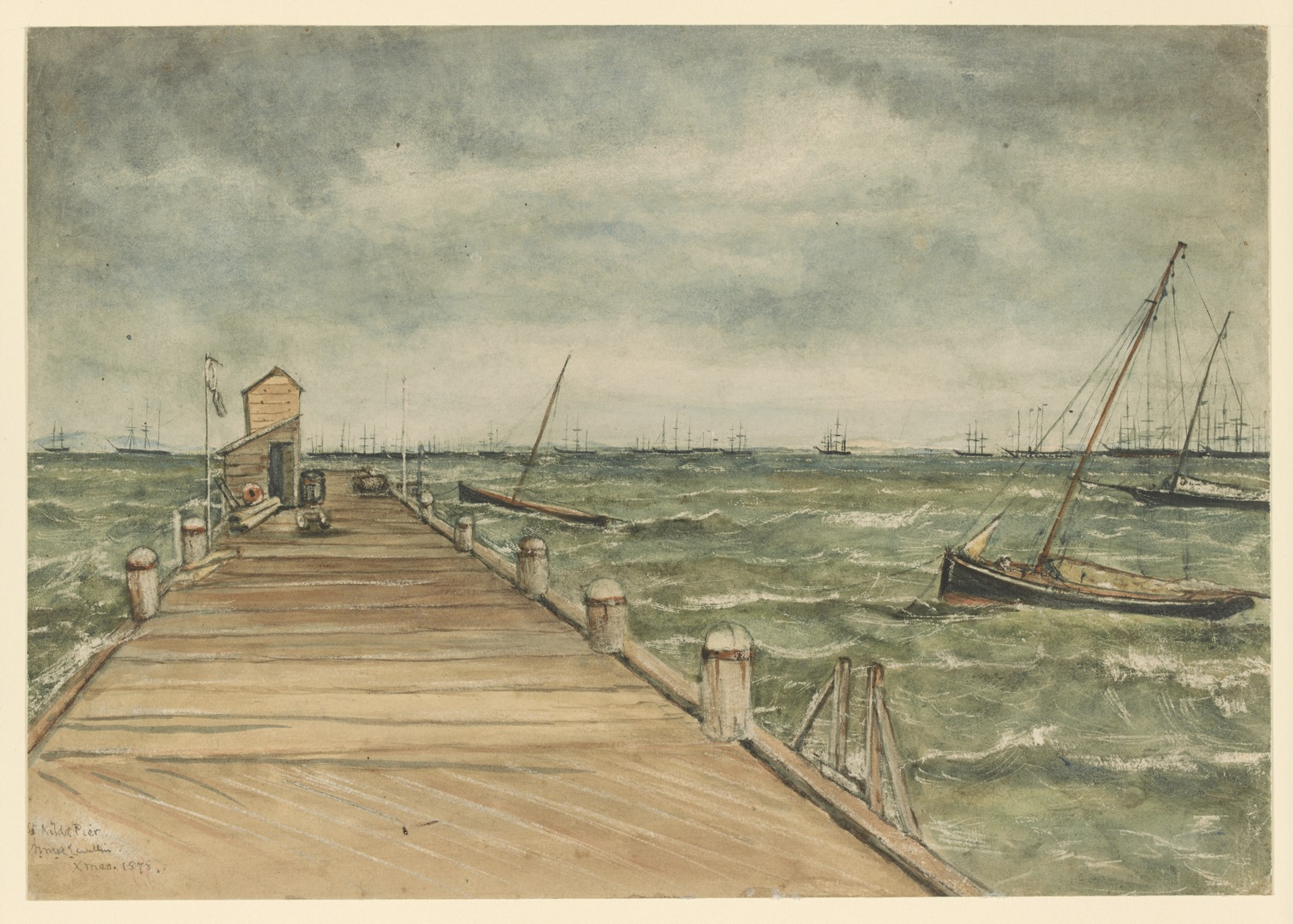
St. Kilda Pier, Xmas, 1878
Images courtesy of Pictures Collection, State Library Victoria
