= Mary Elizabeth Livingston =

Australian artist and botanical illustrator

Mary Elizabeth Livingston (21 August 1857 – 18 December 1913) was a late-colonial Australian artist. She was best known as a botanical artist, specialising in Tasmanian native flora.

== Biography ==
Mary Elizabeth Livingston was born 21 August 1857 in Hobart, Tasmania, the eldest daughter of John Lees Livingston (1824–1911) and Mary Fry née McLean (1835–1920). Her sister Lillie also painted. Livingston attended the National Gallery School, Melbourne in 1879 where Eugene von Guerard was Master of Painting. Unusually, she was enrolled in The School of Design and The School of Painting simultaneously. During the 1880s, Mary Livingston taught painting and drawing at schools in Hobart, as well as offering private classes. On 29 March 1890 she married Robert Sydney Milles (1858–1925), a surveyor/engineer, at St. Andrews Church in Hobart. They had three children, Thomas Livingston (b.1891), Mary Lillias (b.1894) and Robert William (b.1899). Livingston continued to paint after her marriage, thereafter signing her work M. E. Milles.

Livingston was a contributor to commemorative albums, including the gift presented to Lady Sarah Smith, the wife of the Premier Sir Francis Smith, in 1883. In 1887 the Tasmanian Government commissioned an album to present to the Earl of Aberdeen, John Hamilton-Gordon on his visit to the state. She also painted on china and porcelain.

She died on 18 December 1913, in Hobart at the age of 54.

== Collections ==
- Allport Library and Museum of Fine Art, State Library of Tasmania, Hobart, Tasmania
