= James William Govett =

- Born: 1910; Hawthorn, Victoria, Australia
- Died: 11 July 1998 (aged 87–88); Kalorama, Victoria, Australia
- Known for: Painting, Watercolour
- Movement: Impressionism

James William Govett (1910 – 11 July 1998) was an Australian impressionist who worked mostly in watercolor and oil, focusing on landscapes and portraits.

== Early life ==
Govett was born in 1910 in the small suburb of Hawthorn in Melbourne, Australia, to parents Alexander and Helena Nellie Govett. During Govett's childhood, his family moved often due his father's job as a State Savings Bank Branch Manager. Govett studied art at the National Gallery School in Melbourne, and later at the Max Meldrum School from 1930 to 1939 while working as a bank clerk at the State Bank. His mother was also a painter and studied with Max Meldrum from 1931 to 1950.

Govett served in the Army in the Pacific during World War II for five years, and was awarded the Pacific Star for his service. After the war, he moved to London, where he studied under Thomas Dugdale at the Chelsea School of Art in 1947.

== Career ==
During his lifetime Govett lived in London and Melbourne, having a studio at 22 Cheyne Gardens, Chelsea, London in the early 1970s. While in London, he produced portraits of adults and children, as well as contemporary scenes of the city. He also did copies of old masters' works such as Rembrandt at the Rijksmuseum in Amsterdam. One of his most famous portraits, "Portrait of Sir Charles Mackerras", was exhibited at Qantas Gallery, London.

In later years, he returned permanently to Melbourne and resumed his residence at 22 Scenic Crescent, Kalorama, in the Dandenongs. He died on 11 July 1998 and was buried at the Kangaroo Ground Cemetery on 16 July 1998.

== Exhibitions ==
- National Gallery School, Melbourne – 1946
- Athenaeum Gallery – 5 January 1953 (Joint Exhibition with Nellie Govett)
- Athenaeum Gallery – 29 April 1957 (Joint Exhibition with Nellie Govett)
- Qantas Gallery, London – 4 October 1966
- Woburn Abbey – 1972
- Hilton Park Lane London – 1970s
- Soroptomist Headquarters (Victoria), South Yarra – September 1993 (A retrospective art exhibition of two artists – mother and son: Helena Nellie Govett and James Romaine Govett)

== Known portraits ==
- Sir Lawrence Bragg. Exhibited Qantas Gallery, London. 1966, (Correspondence in National Archives, London).
- Viscount Bruce of Melbourne. (1948/9) Commissioned by United Nations. UNESCO Paris
- The Earl of Caithness (Malcolm Sinclair, 20th Earl of Caithness) (London 1967). Exhibited at Hilton Gallery, London. 197-?) (Caithness Collection, Scotland)
- Ma Dalley - Mayor of Kew in 1954
- Prof. A.C. Chisholm (1953) submitted for Archibald Prize.
- Madame Fernanda Milinaire, wife of Didier Milinaire, son of the Duchess of Bedford. Exhibited at Woburn 1972.
- Sir Alexander Downer, Australian High Commissioner, London. Exhibited Qantas Gallery, London. 1966?
- James Govett (1960) (self portrait: titled on verso "The Laughing Artist") (Private Collection, Melbourne)
- John Govett (Private Collection, Melbourne)
- Mrs (Nellie) Govett (after Max Meldrum portrait) Kyneton Historical Society (Bequested by the artist)
- Lady Deborah Vernon Hackett (1887–1965) St Georges College, University of Western Australia. Perth. (Source: Australian Dictionary of Biography)
- Joan Hammond. Exhibited Qantas Gallery, London, 1966
- Rolf Harris. (London 1966) Exhibited Qantas Gallery, London. 1966 (Private Collection, Melbourne)
- Robert Helpmann. Exhibited Qantas Gallery, London, 1966
- Graham Kennedy (Bequested by the artist to Mornington Memorabilia Society)
- Sir John Longstaff. (Bequested to the NGV... but not in their listing)
- Charles Mackerras. Exhibited Qantas Gallery, London, 1966
- Ken Petrie. (Private Collection, Melbourne)
- H.R.H. Princess Margaret. (1952) Victoria League
- Field Marshal Viscount Slim (Seaford House, Belgrave Square) Exhibited at Woburn in 1972)
- Dr Henry Douglas Stephens (1877–1952) Stephen's family collection, (Melbourne?) (Source: Australian Dictionary of Biography)
- Marita Swift (Cousin of James) Swift Family collection
- Malcolm Smart (served with James in New Guinea WWII) Smart Family collection

== Sources ==
- "An easel on wheels". Morning Herald (Sydney). 4 October 1966
- "Art is her only gossip". The Argus 6 January 1953
- "Australian artist James Govett..." The Herald. 17 November 1952.
- "Disappointed". Unknown newspaper 17 June 1953
- Govett, James William. (1972) Exhibition of Portraits and Landscapes by James Govett: 30 August/ 27 September 1972: Woburn Abbey seat of the Duke and Duchess of Bedford. 7p.
- Govett, James William. (197-?) James Govett: Exhibition London Hilton Art Gallery, Park Lane W.1: 13–26 July. 5p.
- Govett, James William and Govett, Helena Nellie. A retrospective art exhibition of two artists – mother and son: Helena Nellie Govett and James Romaine Govett at Soroptomist Headquarters, South Yarra. September 1993
- "I found Rembrandt's secret..." Sun-Herald (Sydney). 9 October 1996.
- james.govett's photostream Flickr
- "James Govett...Rembrandt's glow". Unknown newspaper 20 April 1957.
- James Govett to Lawrence Bragg W.L. (National Archives: BRAGG/54A/46) Correspondence in 1966 re offer to do his portrait for notable Australians show at Qantas Gallery (files at Royal Institution of Great Britain)
- Matheson, Anne. "Princess Anne's escort: Australian has painted portrait of the young Earl of Caithness". The Australian Women's Weekly. 21 June 1967. p. 22
- National Archives of Australia. Govett, James William: War Service Record. www.naa.gov.au
- National Dictionary of Biography. (Several articles have indications of portraits done by James Govett).
- Noted portraitist in Canberra. Canberra Times. 10 October 1964. p. 14.
- Obituary for James Govett (placed by DeWolfe family) The Age. 14 July 1998.
- Obituary for James Govett (placed by Molesworth family) The Age. 13 July 1998.
- Perry, Peter & Perry, John. Max Meldrum & Associates: Their Arts, lives and influences. Castlemaine Art Museum, 1996.
- Phillip Caldwell Auctioneers. The James & Helen Johnson Collection & selected vendors: Sunday 11 June 2007. (inc. 20 lots of paintings by James Govett)
- "Princess most beautiful girl I have seen". The Sun (Melbourne). 26 December 1952.
- Public Records Office, (Melbourne). Will, probate and administration files: Govett, James William 1998.
