= Christian Waller =

Australian artist

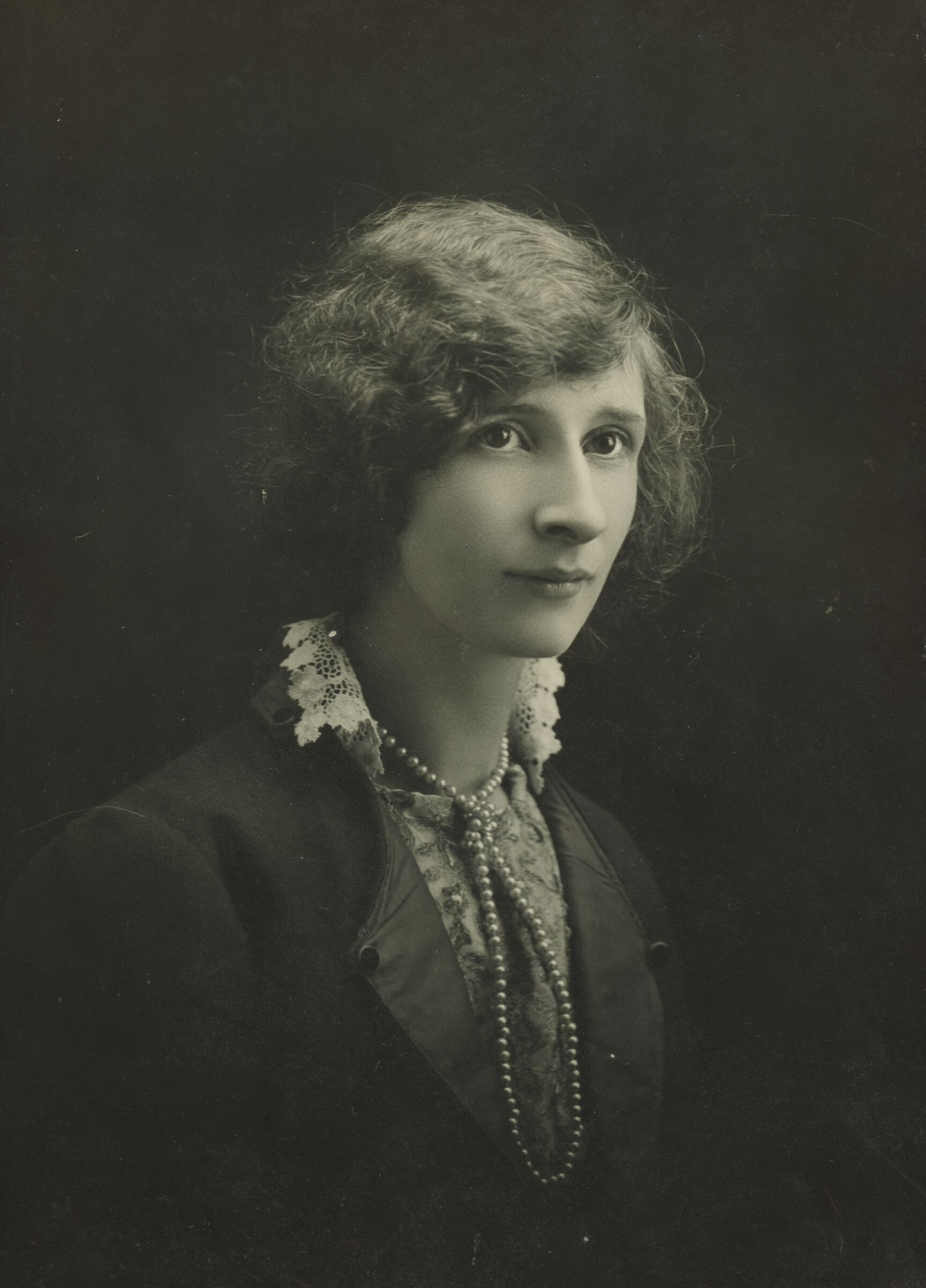
- Unknown photographer (1920s) Christian Waller, National Portrait Gallery
- Born: Christian Marjory Emily Carlyle Yandell; 2 August 1894; Castlemaine
- Died: 25 May 1954 (aged 59); Melbourne
- Resting place: Fawkner Crematorium, Melbourne
- Education: National Gallery School
- Known for: Printmaking, painting, stained glass, illustration
- Movement: Arts and Crafts Movement, Theosophy
- Spouse: Napier Waller
- Patrons: Louis Williams (architect)

Christian Marjory Emily Carlyle Waller (nee Yandell; 2 August 1894 - 25 May 1954) was an Australian printmaker, illustrator, muralist and stained-glass artist. At 15 she moved to Melbourne, where she studied at the National Gallery School. In 1915 she married fellow-student Napier Waller.

Waller was Australia's only professional woman stained-glass artist until the craft revival of the 1970s and was much sought after as an illustrator and stained-glass artist; after the Second World War, she had a five-year waiting list and more commissions than she could execute. Her glass adorns over 20 churches in Victoria and New South Wales. Waller signed and exhibited her work under her maiden name (Yandell) in her early career, but later used her married name.

== Early life ==
Waller was born in Castlemaine, Victoria, to Emily and William Yandell, a plasterer, who died when she was five, when she moved to Langston Street, Bendigo, to live with her sister Florence and husband Alexander James Sclater. She was one of seven children.

== Early career ==
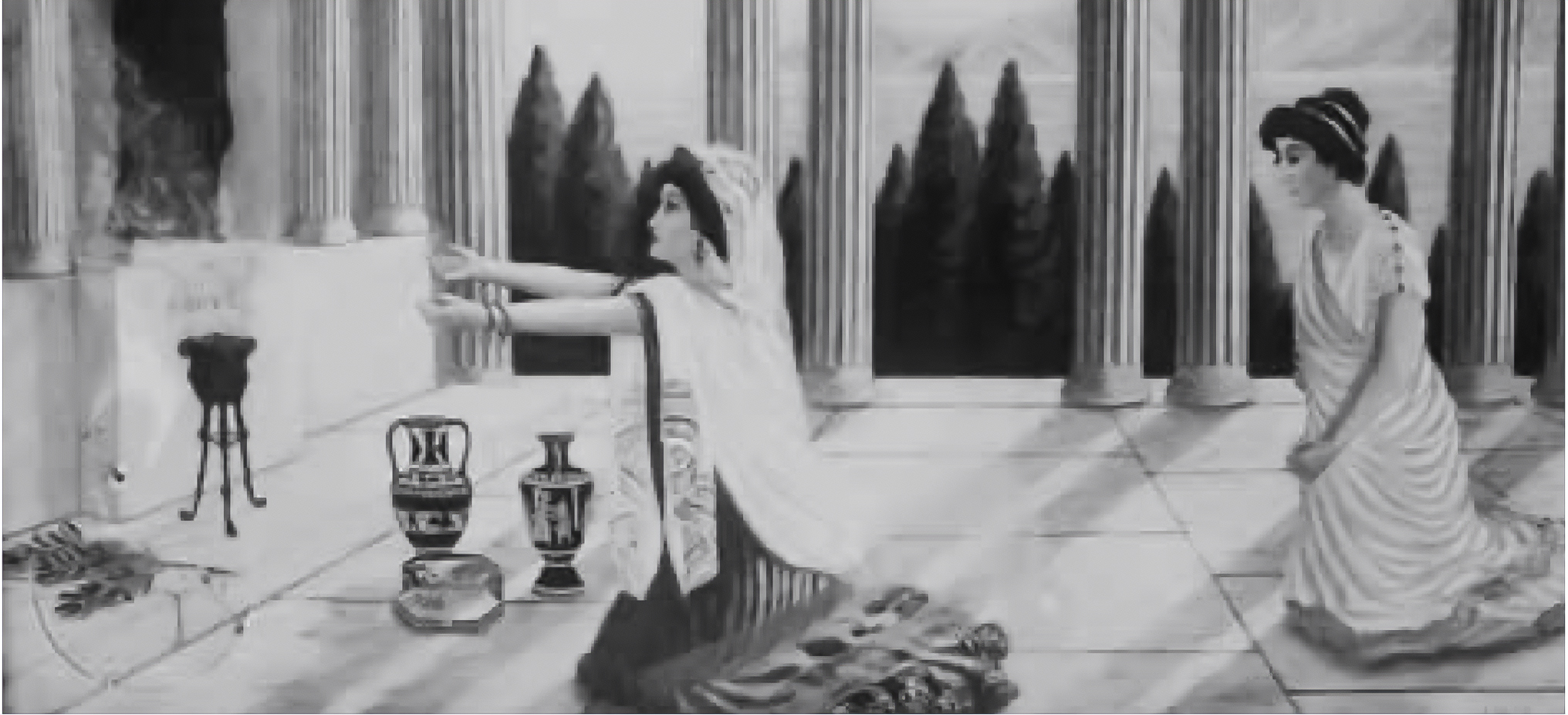
Christian Yandell (Waller) A Petition, 1909 Print, Bendigo Art Gallery, Original work location unknown

Christian studied painting at the Castlemaine School of Mines under Carl Steiner and then at the Bendigo School of Mines with Hugh Fegan. In 1909, her painting A Petition (a Greek scene featuring her sister Florence), was accepted for exhibition at the Bendigo Art Gallery and was shown at the local Masonic hall, the gallery committee noting that "Miss Christian Yandell, who is only 14 years of age, is considered by competent critics to be a rising artist." The mayor and the Masonic lodge raised money through the sale of her works by art union to send her to study art in Melbourne.

Christian moved to Melbourne in 1909 at age fifteen, where she studied at the National Gallery School under Frederick McCubbin and Bernard Hall and exhibited in the Singer Depot windows in The Block, Collins Street, in 1910. While there she won several student prizes and exhibited with the Victorian Artists Society (1913–22). She illustrated numerous publications, such as Melba's Gift Book of Australian Art and Literature (1915), many published by Edward Vidler. She met and married fellow-student Mervyn Napier Waller in 1916.

During the 1920s, Waller became a leading book illustrator, winning acclaim as the first Australian artist to illustrate Alice in Wonderland (1924). "Yandell’s drawings are an eclectic mix, ranging from depictions of the iconic Mad Hatter’s Tea Party through to densely drawn processional scenes and simple sketches of Wonderland’s inhabitants." Her skill in drawing was conspicuous and was praised by fellow students such as Ola Cohn. Her illustration work supported her husband when he returned from the First World War wounded and was unable to work for some time.

While at art school, Waller became interested in Theosophy, which was very much dans le vent at the time. She did not become a member but joined the library and attended lectures. This was an important influence on her for the rest of her life, although she never abandoned the Christian faith altogether, creating a personal synthesis of these beliefs.

== Graphic works ==
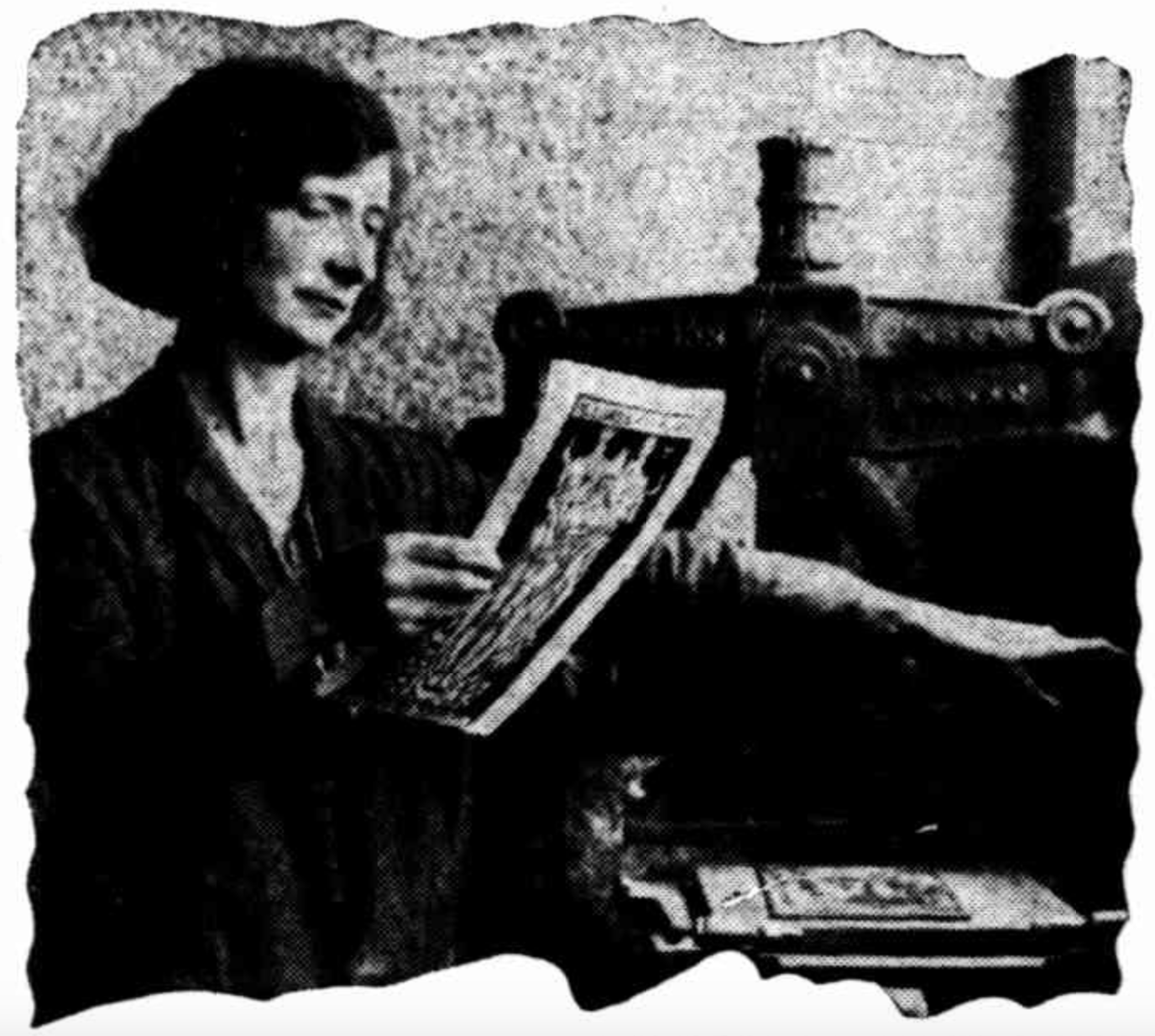
Christian Waller, with a hand-printed book, 1932

As a printmaker, Waller is best known for her powerful, bold linocuts printed on her own press, including many bookplates for friends. She exhibited extensively at the usual venues: the Victorian Artists Society, Robertson and Mullens and the New Gallery. Her work was appreciated by critics and sought after. Her early illustrations partake of a range of influences from the 'golden age of printmaking', including Aubrey Beardsley, Kai Nielsen and Arts and Crafts illustration. Her linocuts exhibited Art Deco tendencies stylistically, while having a range of symbolic references drawn from classical and Arthurian mythology, Egyptian and Hermetic lore and astrology and numerology. She created linocut bookplates for many of her friends.

Her tour de force was the set of seven printsThe Great Breath (1932). These illustrated Theosophical doctrine drawn from Madame Blavatsky's The Secret Doctrine, and were well received by critics such as Blamire Young and Harold Herbert. They were produced by her own Golden Arrow Press, and Hendrik Kohlenberg suggests that Waller undertook most of the physical production of the book in her Fairy Hills studio. Only a small number of the planned 150 book edition for The Great Breath was ever produced.

She wrote a second book The Gates of Dawn, illustrated with lithographs, but put it aside to help Napier with his Newspaper House mosaic commission, and unfortunately never published it. It was published by her niece Klytie Pate with Richard Griffin in 1977. "Her print work is characterised by a complex symbolism, combining ancient classical and literary subjects alongside occult motifs in a dynamic style owing much to the bold geometry of Art Deco and the handmade ethos of the Arts and Crafts movement." A third book, The Woman of Faery, was projected but never completed.

In 1942 she painted a large mural of the Nativity for Christ Church, Geelong and in 1937 one of The Robe of Glory for Fawkner Crematorium; by the end of her life she had completed more than a hundred stained-glass windows.

== Stained Glass ==
Beside her graphic works, Waller was a leading professional stained-glass maker, being at the time one the few acknowledged Australian woman professionals, beside contemporaries Amalie Colquhoun and Nora Burden. She and Napier had begun to work for William Montgomery, a leading trade glass firm, while still students, and Christian began creating her own commissions from 1927. In 1929 she and Napier travelled to Europe where they spent valuable time at the Arts and Crafts studio of British stained glass artist Veronica Whall in London and at An Túr Gloine in Ireland with which a number of women stained glass artists, Evie Hone, Beatrice Elvery, Wilhelmina Geddes, Catherine O'Brien, and Kathleen Quigly, were affiliated with founder Sarah Purse. On her return she devoted herself mainly to stained glass work, influenced by these studios. She was extensively patronised by the architect Louis Williams. From 1927 to 1953 she produced more than one hundred and twenty individual stained-glass panels. In this medium she was innovative, employing radical techniques unknown in Australia at the time. She did all the work herself, while at the same time assisting Napier Waller with his increasing mosaic commissions.

Waller's windows display much of the Theosophical spirituality that she had first become interested in while at art school. Their symbolism is rich and complex, drawing on varied sources. Miley notes:

"Her windows, mainly ecclesiastical commissions, are notable for the originality of their concepts, the beauty of their colouration and delicacy of painting. They combine subtle and varied symbolism with a strong personal element which gives them a drawing power beyond the usual."

A catalogue raisonné of her stained glass was published in 2022. Large collections of her glass are at Geelong Grammar School Chapel; St James Anglican Church, Ivanhoe and St Mark's Anglican Church, Camberwell. Other notable works are at St Matthew's Anglican Church, Prahran; Scotch College Chapel; Christ Church Anglican Church, Geelong and Canterbury Uniting Church. Designs and drawings for stained glass are held in many Australian public gallery collections.

== Personal life ==
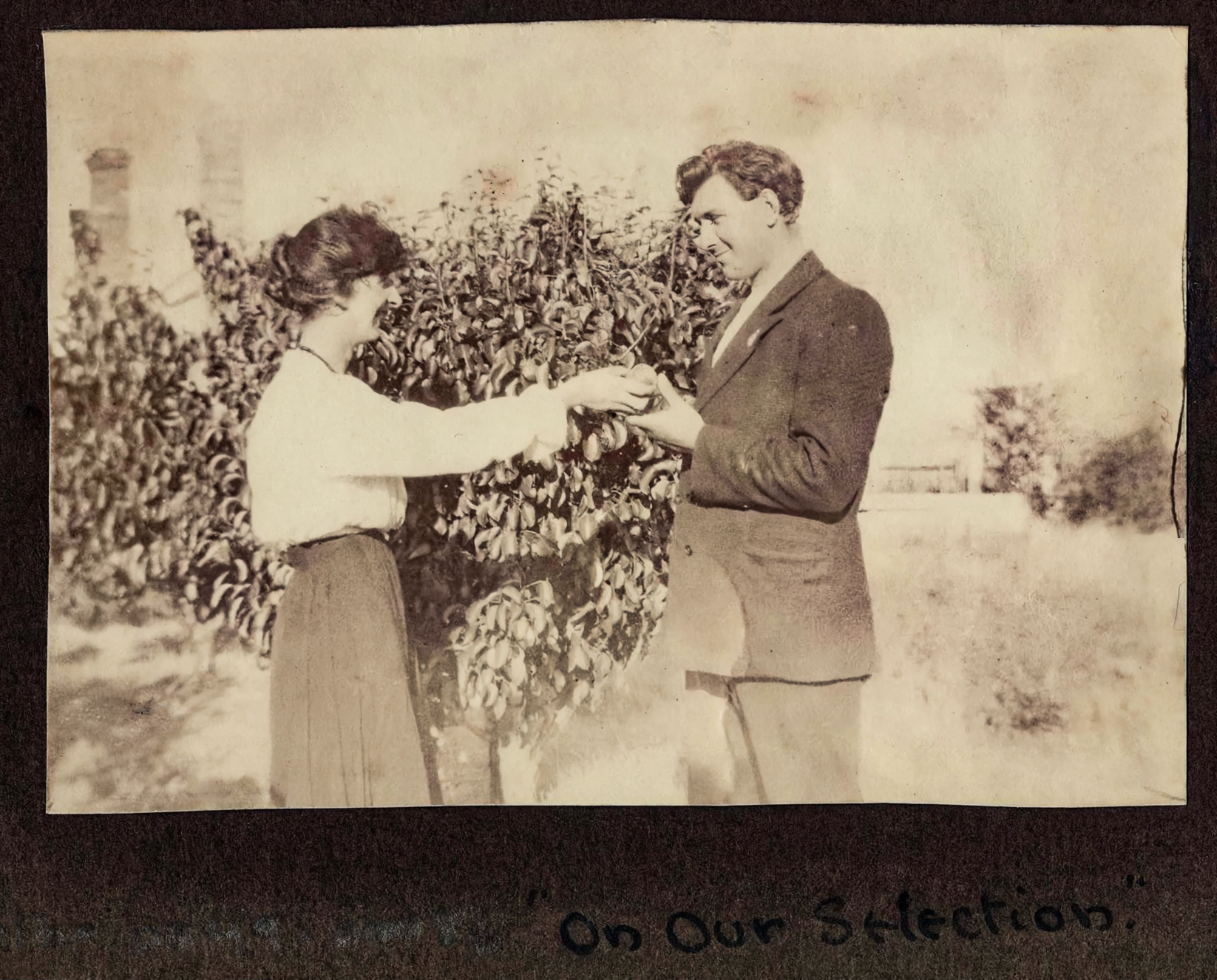
1920s photograph of Christian and Napier Waller with fruit tree. Card inscribed "On Our selection" under image, and on front: "Best Wishes to J. B. Trinick". Courtesy University of Melbourne Archives

In 1915 Christian married fellow art student Napier Waller who enlisted in 1916 and served in France, where he lost his right arm to injuries. He learned to use his left hand while recuperating, during which time Christian supported them with her extensive book illustration. She was especially sought after by Edward Vidler to illustrate poetry and fiction and her drawings, exhibited widely, were admired by collectors.

The Wallers' Arts and Crafts style house was constructed in Crown Rd, in the Ivanhoe precinct known as Fairy Hills, by builder Phillip Millsom in 1922, through a War Services loan, to the artists' design and specifications. Lit by windows high up on a mezzanine 'minstrel gallery' was a hall in which they entertained their friends including their neighbour Norman McGeorge and the musicians Bernard Heinz and Fritz Hart, for whom Christian made posters and concert decorations, and Percy Meldrum, architect of Newspaper House which Napier decorated with a mosaic, with furniture designed by the Wallers and painted by Christian in the Arts and Crafts manner and made for them by the Goldman Manufacturing Co.

The Wallers were childless but Christian gathered around her a group of young people who she referred as her 'children' and whom she mentored; Ron Meadows, Harry Tatlock Miller and Hilda Elliott, who became lifelong friends. In 1925 Christian's niece Klytie Pate (née Sclater) came to live with them when Pate's father remarried. She assisted in the studio and their relationship was close; Christian encouraged Pate's talents and she became a significant Australian ceramicist, her work influenced by Christian's ideas.

In the 1930s Napier Waller began an affair with one of his students at the Working Men's College where he taught, New Zealander Lorna Reyburn, which Christian discovered in about 1937. In 1939 she left, travelling to New York where she joined the community of the African-American philosopher and mystic Father Divine. In 1940 her friend the composer Jack Tallis persuaded her to return. She spent the rest of her life at Crown Road immersing herself in her work and becoming increasingly reclusive.

Waller suffered from heart disease but continued to work, fulfilling an endless stream of commissions. She had to give up work in the early 1950s and died aged 59 of hypertensive heart disease in May 1954. She was cremated and her ashes interred at Fawkner Crematorium, where some years before she had painted The Robe of Glory.

== Collections ==
- National Gallery of Australia: 83 works, and Napier Waller's portrait (1932) of his wife
- The Bendigo Art Gallery holds her self-portrait (1915)
- Castlemaine Art Museum holds 11 works
- National Gallery of Victoria: 50 works
- Art Gallery of New South Wales; 4 works
- Art Gallery of South Australia
- Hamilton Art Gallery
- Ballarat Art Gallery
- Warrnambool Art Gallery
- State Library of Victoria
- State Library of Queensland

== Publications ==
Though Waller completed The Gates of Dawn it was not published in her lifetime. Her niece Klytie published it, as well as a facsimile edition of The Great Breath, with Gryphon Books in Melbourne in 1978.

== Bibliography ==
- Roger Butler Christian Waller 1895-1956 [sic] Deutscher Galleries, Armadale, 1978
- Emma Busowsky Cox (ed): Daughters of the Sun: Christian Waller and Klytie Pate Bendigo Art Gallery, Bendigo 2018
- Jenny McFarlane: Concerning the Spiritual: The Influence of the Theosophical Society on Australian Artists 1890-1934 Australian Scholarly Publishing, North Melbourne 2012
- Caroline Miley: Christian Waller Stained Glass: Towards the Light Australian Scholarly Publishing, North Melbourne 2022
- David Thomas (ed): The Art of Christian Waller Bendigo Art Gallery Bendigo 1992

== Exhibitions ==
- 1923, 1 August: Exhibition of Woodcuts. Tyrrell's Galleries, NSW
- 1931, 3–24 December: 7th Xmas Exhibition of Etchings and Woodcuts by Leading English and Australian Artists
- 1932, 5–16 April: Exhibition of Linocuts, Everyman's Lending Library
- 1932, 6–24 December: Eighth Xmas Exhibition of Etchings and Woodcuts by Master Etchers, Seddon Galleries, Melbourne
- 1934, 16–26 November: Heidelberg Art Exhibition. Ivanhoe Hall

=== Posthumous ===
- 1976, 1 July 1976–1 October: Outlines of Australian Printmaking: Prints of Australia from the last third of the 18th century until the present time. Ballarat Fine Art Gallery
- 1978, 13 April – 5 May: A Survey of Australian Relief Prints 1900 - 1950. Deutscher Galleries
- 1978, 8–30 September 1978: Christian Waller 1895-1956 [sic]. Deutscher Galleries
- 1983, 8 June–24 June: Images of Women Prints and Drawings of the Twentieth Century. University Of Melbourne Art Gallery
- 1987, 30 April–30 May: Masterpieces of Australian printmaking. Josef Lebovic Gallery, Sydney
- 1988, 5–26 March: Australian women printmakers, Josef Lebovic Gallery, Sydney
- 1992: The Art of Christian Waller, curated by David Thomas. Bendigo Art Gallery
- 1992, 20 September – 25 October: The Art of Christian Waller. Castlemaine Art Gallery And Historical Museum
- 1995, 8 March 1995: Women Printmakers 1910 to 1940 in the Castlemaine Art Gallery and Historical Museum. Castlemaine Art Gallery And Historical Museum
- 2017/18, 11 November—5 February: Daughters of the Sun: Christian Waller and Klytie Pate. Castlemaine Art Museum
- 2018/19, 10 November–10 February: Daughters of the Sun, curated by Emma Busowsky Cox, Bendigo Art Gallery

== See also ==
- Theosophy and visual arts
