= Newcastle Art Gallery =

Coordinates: 32.9294°S 151.7729°E

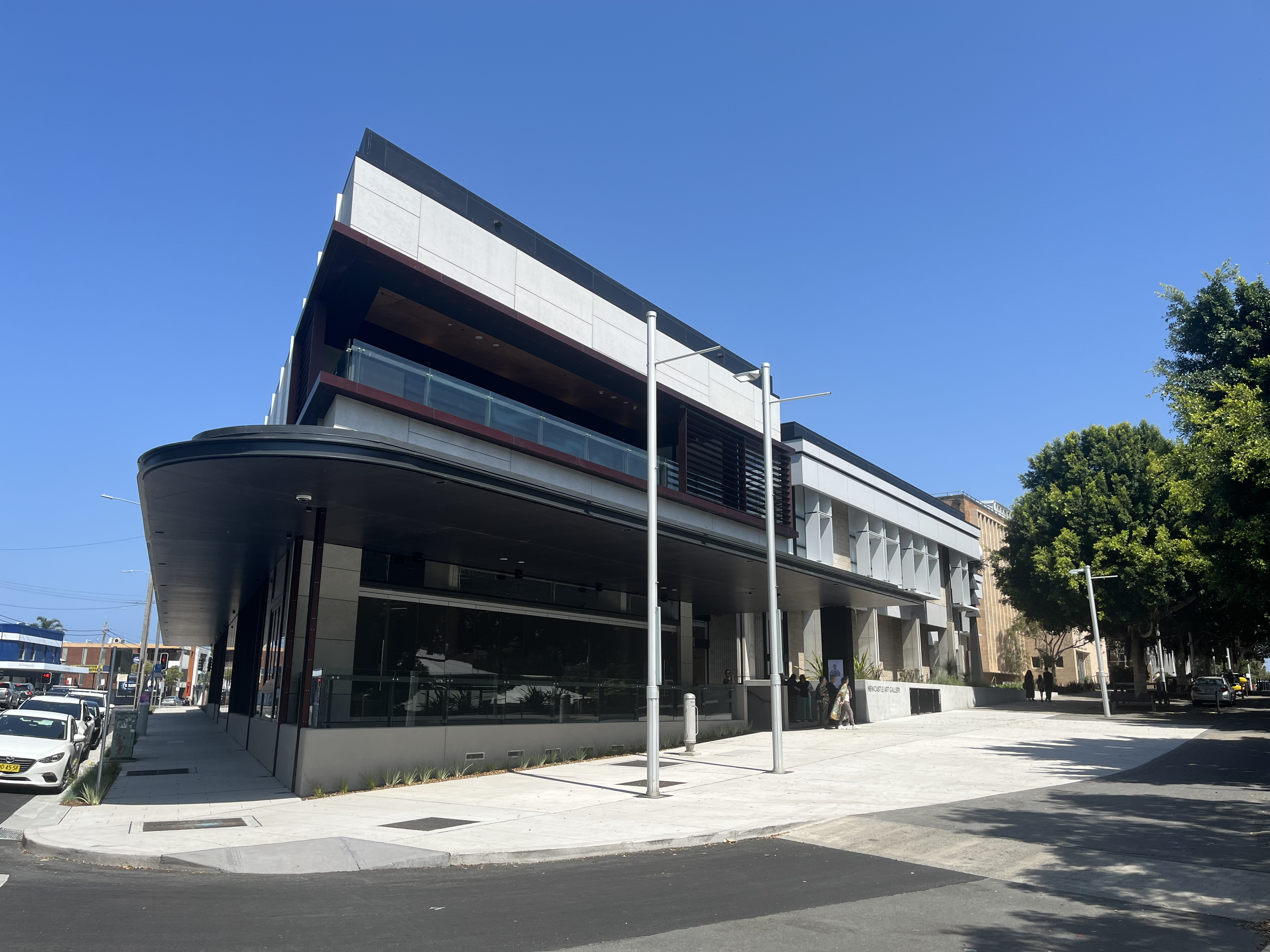
- Newcastle Art Gallery, September 2025
- Former name: Newcastle City Art Gallery, Newcastle Region Art Gallery
- Established: 1945
- Location: Laman Street, Newcastle, New South Wales, Australia
- Type: Art museum
- Collection size: 7000
- Director: Lauretta Morton
- Website: newcastleartgallery.nsw.gov.au

The Newcastle Art Gallery, formerly the Newcastle City Art Gallery and Newcastle Region Art Gallery, is a large public art museum in Newcastle, New South Wales, Australia.

== History ==
Founded in 1945 with an art collection consisting of 123 works donated by Roland Pope which was conditional on the construction of a gallery to hold it, the museum opened its doors in 1957. It moved to a new, purpose-built museum building in 1977. As a Sydneysider, Pope's collection reflect was Sydney-centric. Under the directorships of the gallery's first two directors, Gil Docking and after him David Thomas, both from Melbourne, saw the collection expand to include artists from Melbourne and Adelaide. A purpose-built building was completed in the 1970s and officially opened by Queen Elizabeth II on Friday 11 March 1977. This building stands today as an example of 1970s geometric architecture in the brutalist tradition.

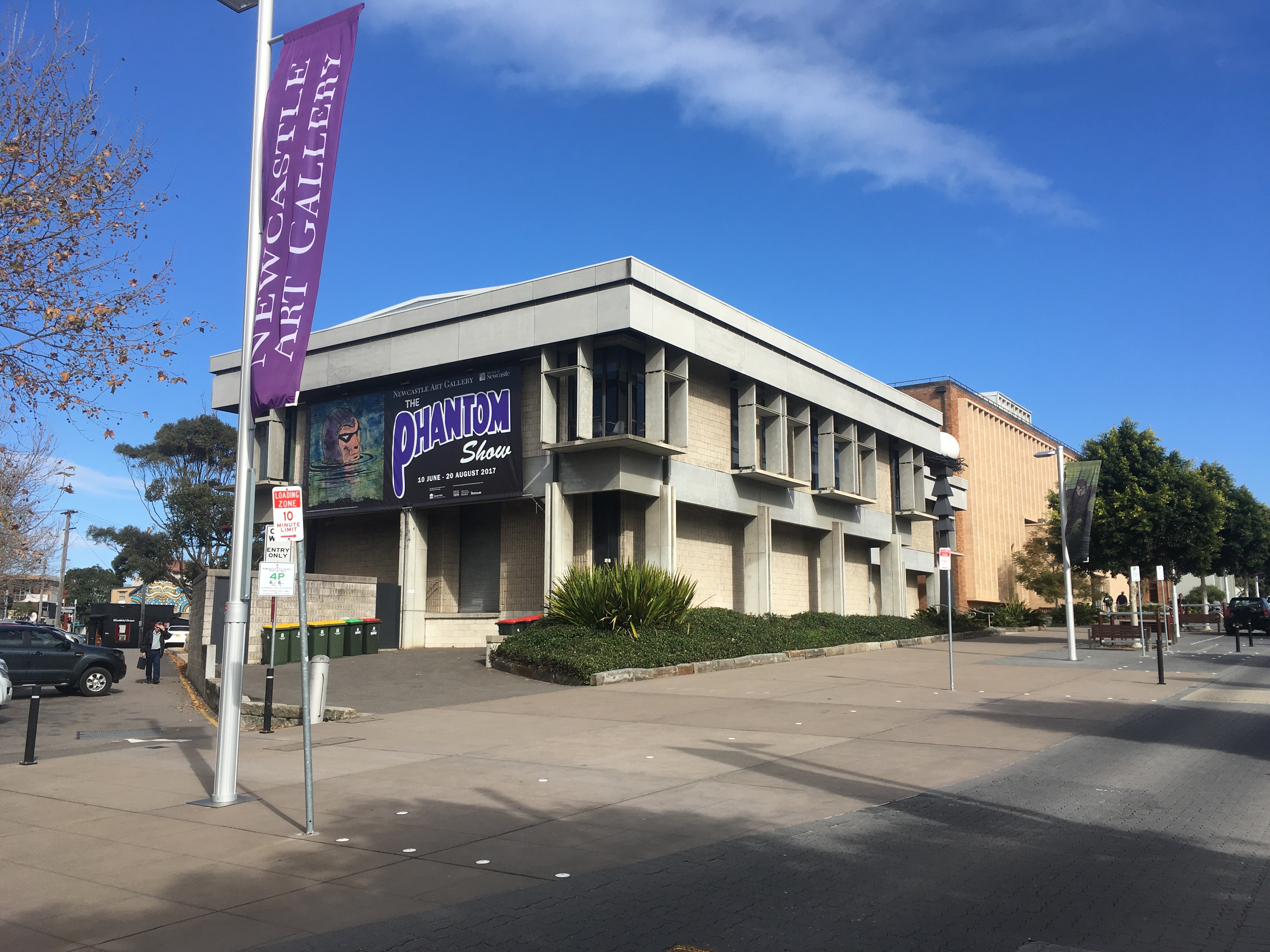
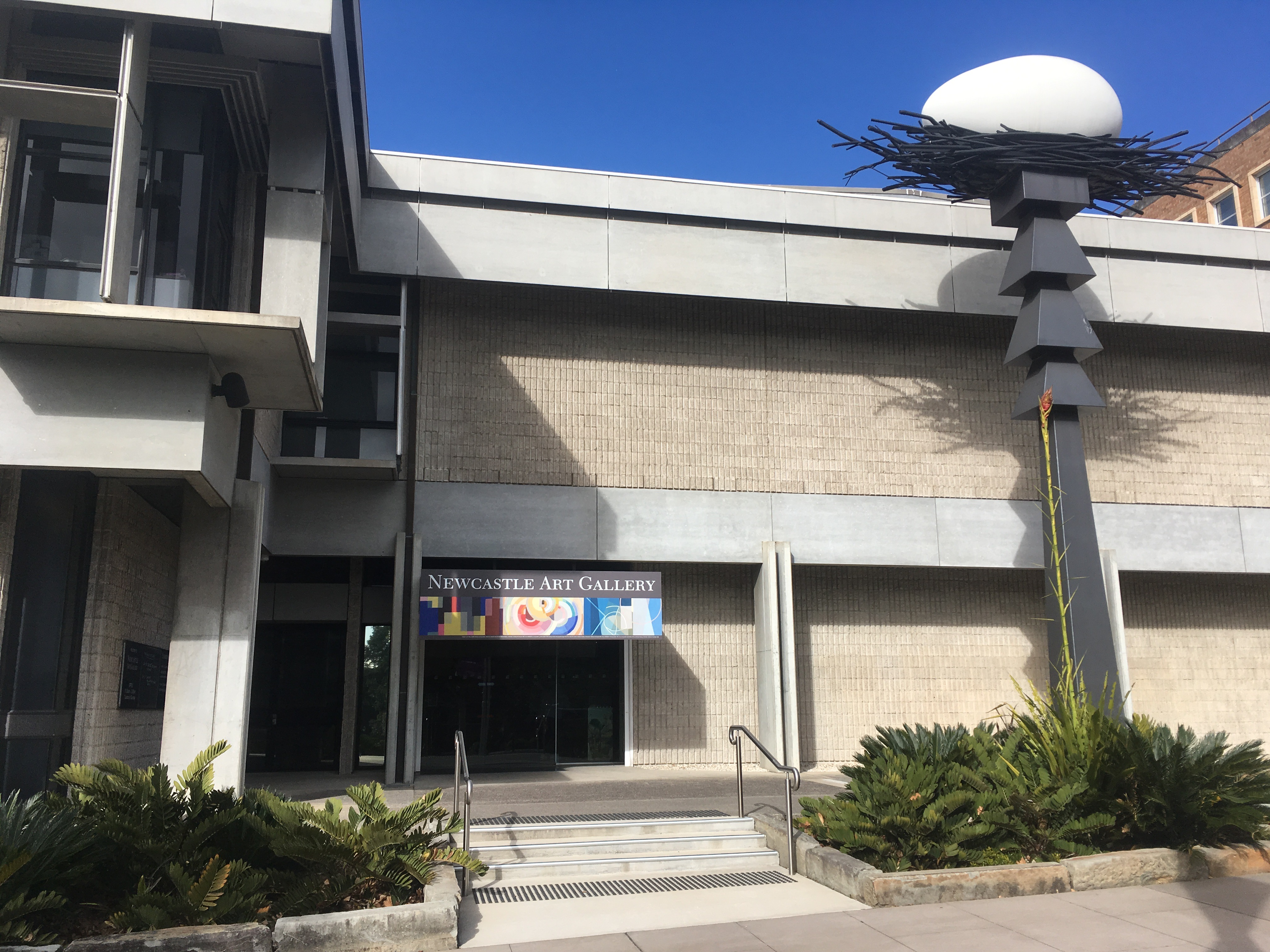
The original Newcastle Art Gallery, prior to the major renovations which began in 2022.

Nick Mitzevich (later director of the National Gallery of Australia), started his career in museum directorship at Newcastle Art Gallery. Appointed in 2001, he ran the gallery for six years, before being appointed to manage the University of Queensland Art Museum in July 2007. During his time at Newcastle, he was credited with transforming the gallery by focusing on community engagement, programming, marketing, and collection development. He liaised with inaugural director Gil Docking regularly as he built the collection. Ron Ramsey, who had spent 14 years at the National Gallery of Australia and a spell in Washington, DC as Australia's cultural attaché, was appointed director in 2007. He remained in the position until 2014. Lauretta Morton OAM was appointed director in March 2018, and remains in the position as of May 2024. She also sits on the Visual Arts Advisory Board of Create NSW, reappointed for a three-year term in August 2021, among other memberships and activities.

=== Redevelopment ===
The City of Newcastle together with Newcastle Art Gallery continued to advocate and plan for an extension to the current gallery, with the aim of expanding the overall exhibition space by 250% and allowing for more of the 7000 items in the collection to be more accessible to the public. The $40 million expansion, which began in 2022, required the art gallery to be closed for two years. Former director Nick Mitzevich is a "passionate advocate" for the expansion.

The gallery was partially reopened in September 2025, giving public access to three of the thirteen gallery spaces. The remaining spaces will reopened in on 28 February 2026 with an exhibition titled Loved Unexpected. This exhibition brought together icons, loved favourites and unexpected gems from the gallery's collection. The expansion had a total cost of $48 million.

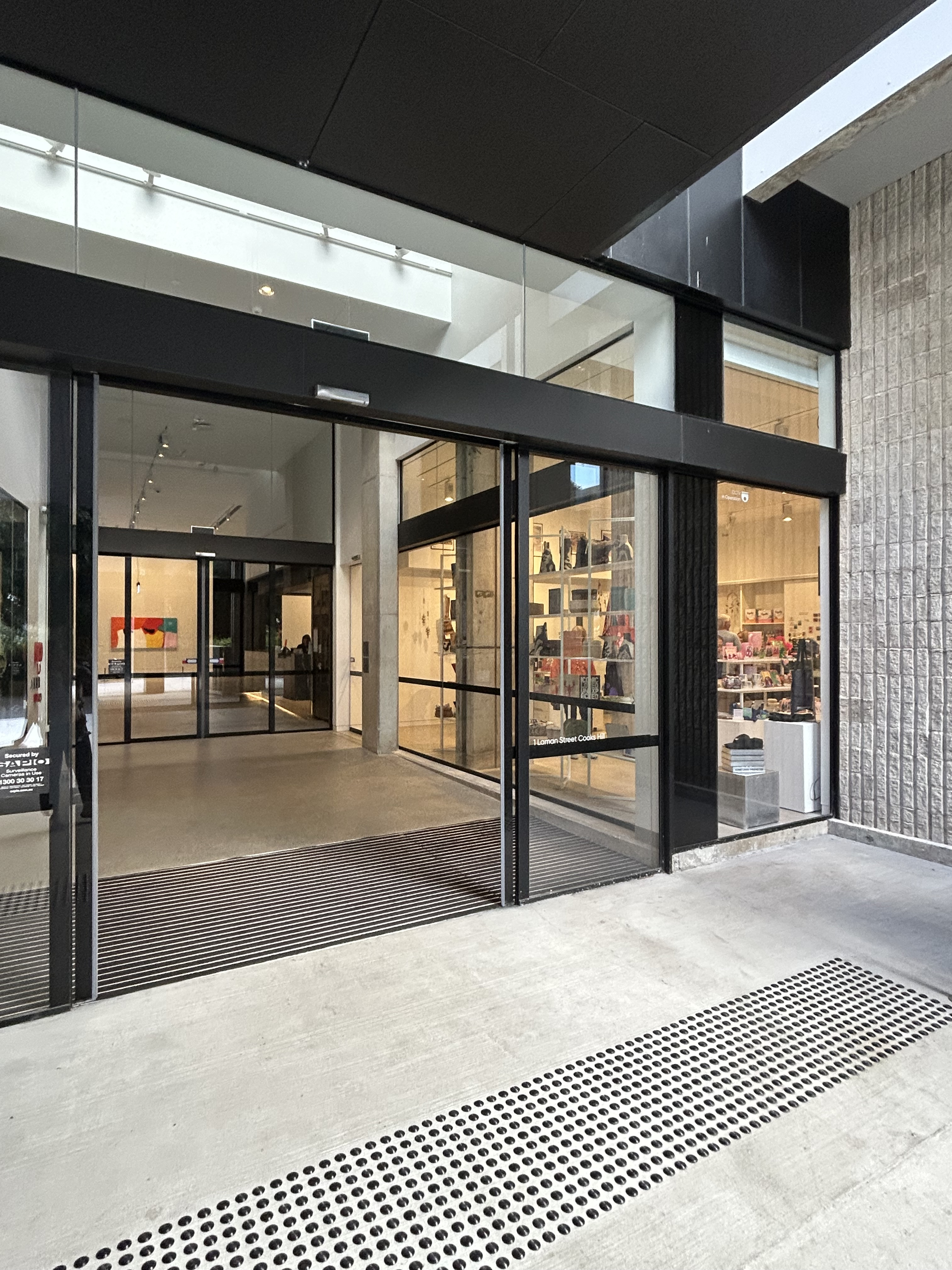
Newcastle Art Gallery entrance, 2026

== Collection ==
The Newcastle Art Gallery collection represents an overview of Australian art from colonial times to the present day and includes various media, including paintings, works on paper, photography, and sculpture. The collection scope includes several important Indigenous barks and memorial pole and a substantial collection of contemporary Indigenous art. Newcastle Art Gallery also holds the largest collection of modern Japanese ceramics in the southern hemisphere.

=== Ceramics ===
Newcastle Art Gallery has a significant collection of Australian and Japanese ceramics. This collection encompasses the leading ceramists: Les Blakebrough, Louise Boscacci, Penny Byrne, Pippin Drysdale, Marea Gazzard, Victor Greenaway, Gwyn Hanssen Pigott, Col Levy, Jenny Orchard, Peter Rushforth, and Bernard Sahm.

=== Japanese ceramics ===
The Japanese collection encompasses both Mingei "folk art" and Sodeisha "crawling through mud association" - avant-garde non-functional ware. This collection encompasses the leading Japanese ceramists; Shôji Hamada, Takeichi Kawai, Kanjirô Kawai, and Kentichi Tomimoto.

=== Sculpture ===
Three-dimensional art work in the collection encompass a diverse range of materials including marble, steel, spinifex grass, wood, ceramic, glass, feathers, engines, and many other source materials. Artists represented by sculptures in the collection include Karl Duldig, Robert Klippel, Clement Meadmore, Margel Hinder, Akio Makigawa, Kathleen Shillam, Hossein Valamanesh, Rosalie Gascoigne, Fiona Hall and Patricia Piccinini.

Iconic Australian artist Brett Whiteley is represented by several artworks, including the large scale Black Totem II, located near the entrance of the gallery.

=== Prints and drawings ===
Newcastle Art Gallery holds a significant collection of prints and drawings. Notable drawings from George Lambert, Godfrey Miller, Rah Fizelle, and John Passmore are represented in the collection. The print collection includes colonial era material such as Richard Browne engravings and work by S. T. Gill, Eugène von Guérard, Walter Preston and Joseph Lycett. The collection includes complete suites, series and folios by artists such as, Arthur Boyd, John Coburn, Imants Tillers, Jesse Traill, George Baldessin, Bea Maddock, Mike Parr, Margaret Preston, Thea Procter, Jan Senbergs, and Salvatore Zofrea.

=== Photography ===
Photography is represented by some of Australia's leading contemporary artists, including Jane Burton, Destiny Deacon, Fiona Hall, Bill Henson, Rosemary Laing, Julie Rrap, Darren Siwes, and Robyn Stacey.

=== Painting ===
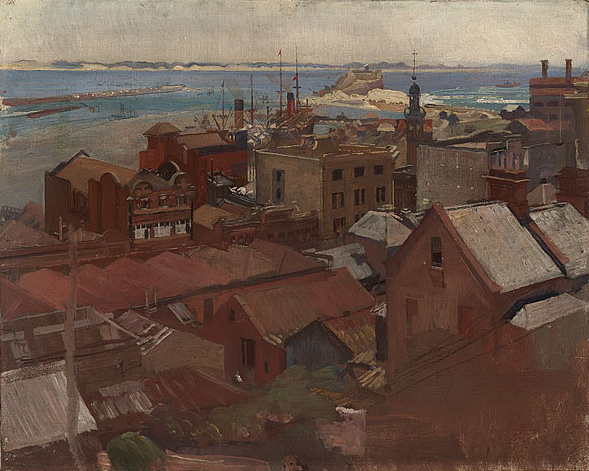
Newcastle, 1925 by George Lambert

Newcastle Art Gallery holds one of the most significant collection of paintings in Australia. This collection spans colonial work by Joseph Lycett, Australian Impressionists such as Arthur Streeton, Hans Heysen, Elioth Grüner, Sydney Long, and Lloyd Rees, through to the leading twentieth-century modernists such as Newcastle-born William Dobell and other modernists Grace Cossington Smith, Arthur Boyd, Sidney Nolan, Robert Dickerson, and Charles Blackman. Newcastle-born artists Jon Molvig and John Olsen are also represented.

=== Video and new media ===
An area of growth within the collection is new media and video art. Shaun Gladwell and TV Moore and Tracey Moffatt are represented in this collection.

=== International art ===
While the Newcastle Art Galley's collection is focused primarily on Australian art, the collection has some significant work from international artists. Renowned American minimalist Carl Andre gifted Steel $\Sigma$ 16 (pronounced "steel sum 16") to the gallery in 2011. Made from 136 hot-rolled steel plates, each 30cm x 30cm x 1cm, this work is important to the collection because of its connection to the city of Newcastle. Andre made the work while in Newcastle in 1978 at the now close BHP.

=== Key artists ===
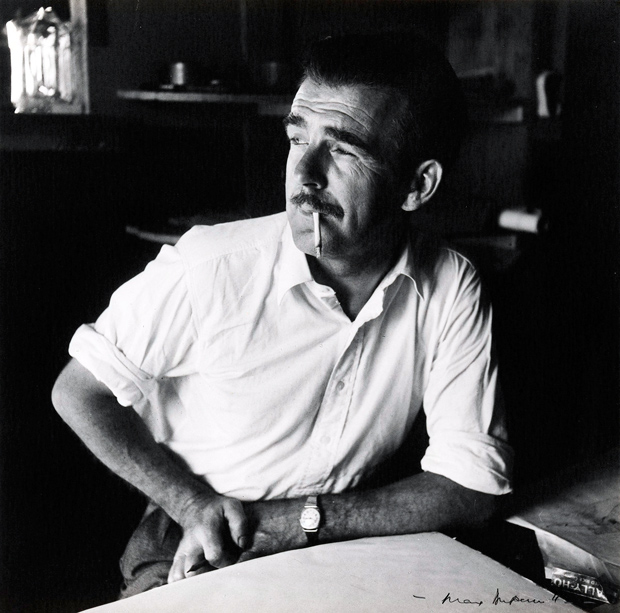
Photograph of painter William Dobell, 1942 by Max Dupain (1911–1992). Dobell was born in Newcastle and is represented in the Newcastle Art Gallery Collection.

Arthur Boyd, David Boyd, Rupert Bunny, Judy Cassab, Grace Cossington Smith, John Coburn, William Dobell, Karl Duldig, Donald Friend, Bill Henson, Joy Hester, Emily Kame Kngwarreye, Tracey Moffatt, Margaret Olley, John Olsen, Patricia Piccinini, Gwyn Hanssen Pigott, Margaret Preston, Lloyd Rees, Brian Robinson, Alex Seton, Ken Thaiday Snr, Brett Whiteley, Michael Zavros.

== Benefaction ==
During her lifetime, Sydney-based artist Margaret Olley donated over 46 art works to Newcastle Art Gallery from artists including Robert Barnes, Cressida Campbell, Ray Crooke, Margaret Cilento, Lawrence Daws, Vicki Glazier, Nicholas Harding, Ben Quilty, and Craig Waddell. William Bowmore, a Newcastle resident, is responsible for some of Newcastle Art Gallery's international works of art, including work by Jules Dalou, Jacob Epstein, Henri Gaudier-Brzeska, and Auguste Rodin. Bowmore also donated Brett Whiteley's 1978 Wynne prize-winning painting Summer at Carcoar. John Olsen's The sea sun of 5 bells, 1964, was donated by Ann Lewis AO following her death; it had previously hung in her dining room from the ceiling for 45 years.

=== Newcastle Art Gallery Foundation ===
Newcastle Art Gallery is supported by the Newcastle Art Gallery Foundation which is not for profit charity. Since 1978 the foundation has helped to raise millions of dollars for the gallery, particularly for the acquisition of art work.
