= Summer at Carcoar =

1977 painting by Brett Whiteley

- Artist: Brett Whiteley
- Year: 1977
- Medium: oil and mixed media on pineboard
- Dimensions: 244 cm × 198 cm (96 in × 78 in)
- Location: Newcastle Art Gallery, Newcastle, Australia
- Website: https://www.artgallery.nsw.gov.au/prizes/wynne/1978/21144/

Summer at Carcoar is a 1977 painting by Australian artist Brett Whiteley. The painting was awarded the Wynne Prize in 1978, the same year that Whiteley also won the Archibald Prize with Art, Life and the other thing and the Sulman Prize with Yellow nude - the only artist to be awarded all three prizes in the one year. The painting depicts the landscape around the town of Carcoar, in the Central West of New South Wales.

the line of the river bisects the painting from top to bottom; smaller arabesques appear here, too, in the outlines of hills in the top left hand corner or in the line of flight of a tiny bee halfway down on the right, visible only on close inspection [...] This is a landscape in drought. Only a narrow stream of greenish water runs between the river's sandy beds; dry grass covers the plains on both sides. But, amid this desiccation, there are flashes of life. Lush puddles of colour collect on the banks of river, in the dripping yellow trees or the petals of flowers. Birds, some of them cut out from magazines and stuck on to the painting, call out from rocks and fence posts.

— Kitty Hauser,

The work was commissioned by businessman and philanthropist William Bowmore and gifted by him to the Newcastle Art Gallery in 1977. It remains part of its collection and has been described as the institution's "major icon work".

The painting was referenced in the 2019 opera Whiteley, based on the life of the artist.
