= George Lawrence (painter) =

Australian painter

- Born: 12 June 1901; Annandale, N.S.W.
- Died: 26 June 1981 (aged 80); Northwood, N.S.W.
- Education: The Julian Ashton Art School
- Notable work: Wynne Prize for Landscape, 1949. 'The Two Rivers'
- Movement: Impressionism

George Feather Lawrence (1901–1981) was born in Sydney, Australia and for many years was regarded as one of the foremost painters in the impressionist style. He studied under Julian Rossi Ashton at the famous Sydney Art School in the old Queen Victoria Building; and later in London and Paris.

== Early life and education ==
George Feather Lawrence was raised in the Sydney suburb of Annandale. Born on 12 June 1901, the fifth child of seven, to English parents from Gloucestershire and Yorkshire. Lawrence was schooled at South Annandale Public, then at neighbouring Petersham High School. After leaving school Lawrence was accepted into the art department of the printers John Sands & Co. as a lithographic apprentice. The apprenticeship would last almost seven years, with Lawrence gaining expertise with printing and the reproduction of art works. The young apprentice was required to attend the Julian Ashton Art School. A turning point in Lawrence’s life, he was introduced to a new world of art and to other aspiring artists who motivated and influenced his career. Lawrence’s career was further accelerated with his move to the well respected commercial art firm of Smith & Julius. He remained there until 1926 moving to "the more lucrative post of commercial designer at Paramount Films Art Department at Surry Hills." Lawrence made his commercial career at Paramount and remained there until 1962; having decided to focus his energies on becoming a full-time artist.

Working and studying in Sydney, he eventually married, raised a family and launched his twin careers as both commercial artist, and as a landscape and urban scene painter. In this latter field Lawrence gained prominence, perhaps more so than for his landscapes although they too were well received. His depictions of industrial cities, their railways, their narrow streets and tenement houses, are painted with a sensitivity normally reserved for rural landscapes.

== Artistic influences ==
The earliest influences during Lawrence’s formative years as an art student were George Lambert and Max Meldrum. A later influence was the work of impressionist painter Elioth Gruner in subject and tone. In later years Roland Wakelin, who like Lawrence worked as a commercial artist out of necessity, inspired Lawrence to further his passion for painting and drawing. In his introductory words, Lloyd Rees argues for Lawrence to be aligned "in the direction of Expressionism, rather than that of Impressionism." The latter is more commonly expressed as the style attributed to Lawrence by art critics of his time.

In 1939 Lawrence was visited at Paramount by his friend William Dobell. Feeling confined to his office, he complained of no suitable scenes to paint. Dobell pointed out "you have subjects all around you." In the same year another event occurred to influence Lawrence's work; the Melbourne Heralds' Exhibition of Modern Painting. The painter who had the greatest appeal to Lawrence was the French artist Maurice Utrillo. His streetscapes of Montmartre would influence Lawrence for years to come.

== Exhibitions and prizes ==
In 1941 Lawrence submitted his work ‘Wet Road, Surry Hills’ to the annual Society of Artists annual exhibition. It was later purchased by the Art Gallery of New South Wales. Seven years later he was elected to the Society, acknowledging his place in the Australian art scene.

George Lawrence’s first one-man exhibition was held at the Macquarie Galleries in 1945 and opened by his lifetime friend and mentor William Dobell. Lawrence was introduced to Dobell through their mutual attendance at Julian Ashton’s School.

1949 was a pivotal year for acceptance and recognition of Lawrence's art work. Early in the year he won the George Crouch Memorial Prize at the Ballarat Fine Art Gallery for his painting ‘Richmond Bridge, Tasmania.’ Later in December he won the Wynne Prize for Landscape at the Art Gallery of New South Wales. His work, ‘The Two Rivers,’ the view from the Lawrence family home at Northwood in Sydney. His winning streak continued in 1950 by winning the Bendigo Art Prize with a painting of Darling Harbour in Sydney.

In 1951 an exhibition at the Macquarie Galleries in Sydney referred to Lawrence’s landscapes as taking a permanent place in the Australian tradition. The exhibition, held prior to his first European trip, mentions a wintry Kiama landscape and the artist's fidelity of observation for scene and mood. Of particular note is how Lawrence, whether painting country buildings or ragged trees is able to capture how "beauty may lurk in the slums, the railway marshalling yards on a wet day, or in the smoky industrial reaches of Sydney Harbour."

An exhibition in Adelaide in 1953 provided evidence of the artistic influences brought to bear on Lawrence’s painting and his position in Australian art. The reviewer describes Lawrence as known and respected, a past winner of the Wynne Prize, as having "a natural affinity at times with Pissarro, at times Utrillo." The exhibition included paintings of London, Devon, Cornwall, and Brixham. All the result of Lawrence’s first productive overseas trip to Europe.

In 1965 Lawrence exhibited at the Darlinghurst Galleries on Crown Street, Darlinghurst. His collection of recent Australian and European paintings included nineteen works on subjects ranging from the Sydney waterfront and city, to the south coast beaches and the Jindabyne area in the Snowy Mountains. "Lawrence's 14 European paintings were executed from sketches made on his last trip to London, Paris and Florence." The thirty three works exhibited showed how productive Lawrence could be when inspired by the scenes around him.

Lawrence was not without his critics and even towards the end of his career his exhibitions were not always universally praised. In 1974 his works were again exhibited at the Macquarie Galleries. The painter and art critic Geoffrey De Groen wrote that Lawrence’s impressionism was now worn out, academic, and enslaved to tradition. He rather brutally stated "George Lawrence blandly trots out a generalised picture postcard cliche." De Groen wrote that Lawrence seemed to paint from his heart and not his head, and the exhibition included scenes from Australia and his last trip to Europe.

== Europe ==
In 1951 Lawrence travelled to Europe to explore the European art scene, drawing and painting. Visiting Marseille, Paris, London, and the port town of Brixham, drawing and painting the harbour and streets. A second and longer trip to Europe was organised in 1963, visiting England, Scotland, Amsterdam, and Italy. All this travelling provided Lawrence with fresh subject matter to fill his canvas. The exhibition coincided with the publication George Lawrence: text on the artist's life by Roland Wakelin, published by Legend Press. In 1968 Lawrence made his last trip to Europe with his wife Dorothy before her death in 1971.

After one final trip to Europe in 1973, Lawrence confined his travels to within Australia, principally Queensland, New South Wales, and South Australia.

== Gallery holdings ==
Public art galleries across Australia hold works by George F. Lawrence. His work has been acquired for other National Collections including Auckland and Dunedin, New Zealand; Kuala Lumpur, Zambia, United Kingdom, France, the Netherlands, Italy and United States of America.

The Art Gallery of N.S.W hold 10 of his paintings and most have digital images. The State Library of New South Wales hold ‘Marshalling yards, White Bay’, 1952. National Gallery of Victoria hold 4, including ‘Surry Hills Street, 1947. The National Gallery of Australia hold 11 of his works including ‘Houses on the Seine.’ The New England Regional Art Museum hold 2 of his works including ‘Paddy’s Plain, Dorrigo’, 1944. Benalla Art Gallery hold ‘Kings Cross, Sydney,’ 1960.

== Legacy and death ==
Continuing interest in the art of George Lawrence is evidenced by sales of his work. Six years after his death, the "highest price recorded for the artist is $20,000 for Sydney Weather, 1950", sold by auction house Christie's in October 1987.

George Feather Lawrence died at Northwood N.S.W. on 26 June 1981, aged 80 years.
