= Mr Joshua Smith =

1943 painting by William Dobell

- Artist: William Dobell
- Year: 1943
- Medium: oil on canvas
- Dimensions: 122 cm × 81 cm (48 in × 32 in)
- Location: Private collection

Mr Joshua Smith, also known as Portrait of an Artist (Joshua Smith), is a 1943 painting by Australian artist William Dobell. The painting is a portrait of Joshua Smith, an artist and friend of Dobell. The painting was awarded the Archibald Prize in 1943. The painting took a modernist approach to portraiture; a break with the realism favoured to that date by Archibald Prize entrants.

[I was] trying to create something, instead of copying something. To me, a sincere artist is not one who makes a faithful attempt to put on canvas what is in front of him, but one who tries to create something which is living in itself, regardless of its subject. So long as people expect paintings to be simply coloured photographs they get no individuality and in the case of portraits, no characterisation. The real artist is striving to depict his subject’s character and to stress the caricature, but at least it is art which is alive.

— Dobell,

The modernist painting attracted vehement criticism and equally passionate praise. The controversy spilled over from the arts world to the general public, with the Art Gallery of New South Wales having to extend opening hours and later prolong the exhibition. Over 140,000 people viewed the portrait during the exhibition – 90% of Sydney's population at the time.

This award was contested in the Supreme Court of New South Wales by Mary Edwell-Burke and Joseph Wolinski on the grounds that the painting was not a portrait but rather a caricature. The case was lost and the award stood. The case was said to have "placed art on trial" and to have raised "questions of what constituted a portrait and what was the relationship of realism to art in general."

Mr Joshua Smith looks like a man naturally deformed or crippled, and suffering, in addition, from malnutrition ... poor Mr Smith is pilloried to eternal, skeletal deformity in the name of up-to-the-minute portraiture

— James Stuart MacDonald,

Smith himself was hurt by the depiction and by the controversy associated with the portrait. In 1990 Smith called the portrait "a curse, a phantom that haunts me. It has torn at me every day of my life."

Dobell sold the painting to Sir Edward Hayward, a businessman from South Australia. In 1952, the painting was damaged in a fire at the Hayward's home. Dobell himself declined to restore the work. In 1972, Kenneth Malcolm, conservator at the National Gallery in London, undertook a restoration. Malcolm worked from a black and white photograph of the original and the extent of the damage required significant repainting. This restoration created further controversy as some questioned if the portrait could still be considered a work by Dobell.

Brett Whiteley's 1978 Archibald Prize winning work Art, Life and the other thing includes a self-portrait of Whiteley holding a copy of Dobell's painting.
