= Image for a Dead Man =

Painting by Ray Beattie

- Artist: Ray Beattie
- Year: 1980
- Medium: synthetic polymer paint, collage on canvas
- Dimensions: 220.5 cm × 147.4 cm (86.8 in × 58.0 in)
- Location: Australian War Memorial, Canberra
- Website: awm.gov.au

Image for a Dead Man is a 1980 synthetic polymer paint, collage on canvas painting by Irish-Australian artist Ray Beattie. The work is one of a series of three paintings by Beattie collectively titled Sentimentality kills.

The photorealistic still life painting depicts a military jacket, slouch hat and identity discs hung over a wooden chair. An Australian flag (the Red Ensign variant) is sitting folded on the chair. The jacket has an Infantry Combat Badge and Vietnam War campaign medals pinned to it. An unplugged telephone socket and cable lie on the floor.

Beattie served with the 2nd Battalion, Royal Australian Regiment in Vietnam between May 1970 and July 1971. The jacket, hat and discs all belong to the artist rather than a dead soldier, however Beattie stated that "whenever he heard of another soldier's death he felt a part of himself also died".

[A]ll the carefully selected and arranged elements of the composition are the tangible traces of someone who is no longer there. The uniform jacket hung across the back of the chair still holds the shape of the wearer. The electrical cord behind the chair and the empty telephone socket ... symbolise that the person is forever out of reach. The expanse of the cold white wall behind the chair signifies the nothingness that is death. The work communicates an overwhelming sense of grief and loss, the simple poignancy of absence that is an inevitable product of war.

— Elena Taylor,

The work was somewhat controversial at the time with the depiction seen as derogatory towards those Australians who fought in Vietnam. After its acquisition by the Australian War Memorial, a member of the public wrote in protest stating "artistic licence and abstract interpretation are completely out of place in a Memorial where the established forte is stark realism and accuracy of presentation." Scott Bevan, author of a book on Australian war art, responded stating."It was Ray's comment on war, not on those sent out to fight, those who do the sending".

The work is part of the collection of the Australian War Memorial in Canberra.
