= William Pidgeon =

Australian painter

William E. Pidgeon
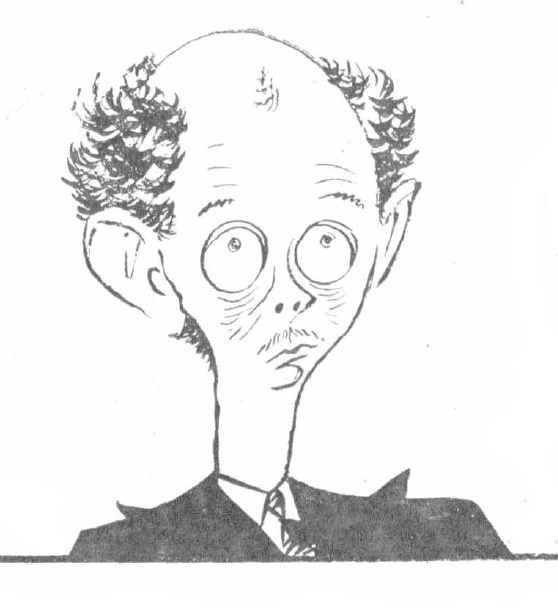
- Self-caricature, William E. Pidgeon by Wep (1940).
- Born: William Edwin Pidgeon; 7 January 1909; Paddington, New South Wales
- Died: 16 February 1981 (aged 72)
- Occupations: Artist, caricaturist, cartoonist, illustrator, painter

Signature
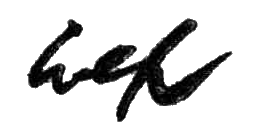

William Edwin Pidgeon, known as Bill Pidgeon and 'Wep', (7 January 1909 – 16 February 1981) was an Australian artist, known as an illustrator, cartoonist and caricaturist, as well as a painter who won the Archibald Prize three times. He was most active as a black-and-white artist in Sydney from the mid-1920s, working as a cartoonist and illustrator for a variety of newspapers. In 1933 Pidgeon was involved in the establishment of The Australian Women's Weekly and was closely involved with the magazine until the late 1940s, his work including the creation of the long-standing comic strip 'In and Out of Society' and producing seventy cover illustrations for the magazine. During World War II he worked as a war correspondent for the parent company, Consolidated Press Ltd. From the 1950s Pigeon focussed on painting and was widely recognised for his skills as a portrait painter.

== Biography ==
=== Early years ===
William Edwin Pidgeon was born on 7 January 1909 in Paddington, an inner Sydney suburb, the younger of two sons of Frederick Castledine Pidgeon, a maker of leaded-windows, and his wife Thirza Jessie (née White). His father died in 1913 when Bill was aged four years, following which the family moved into his maternal grandfather's home in nearby Gurner Street before later returning to their home in Glenmore Road, Paddington.

Bill Pidgeon was schooled at Glenmore Road Public School and later at Darlinghurst Public School. He was awarded a Qualifying Certificate in February 1921. He attended Sydney Technical School from where he was awarded his Leaving Certificate in May 1925. By his teenage years Bill had developed an interest in comic drawing, some early efforts being published in his school magazine in September 1923 (under what became his customary signature 'Wep').

Pidgeon's first job was as an office-boy at the pressed-metal factory of Wunderlich Ltd. in Redfern, where he met William Dobell who was working there as an advertising draughtsman.

Pigeon's formal art training amounted to six months at the J. S. Watkins Art School and two months at Sydney Technical School.

=== Newspaper artist ===
In 1925, aged sixteen, Pigeon became a cadet artist with the Evening News newspaper (and its Sunday edition published as the Sunday News). In April 1925 Pidgeon's first cartoon 'A Crossword Tragedy' was published in the Sunday News. From March to November 1926 he was producing multi-panel cartoons ("by Wep") published in the Evening News on about a weekly basis. In September 1926 Pidgeon's first comic strip, called 'The Trifling Triplets', was published in the Sunday News and ran for the following nine months.

In September 1927 Pidgeon was hired by editor Eric Baume as an artist for the Daily Guardian and Smith's Weekly, both journals owned by Smith's Newspapers Ltd. He mainly produced illustrations and cartoons for the Guardian, but occasionally his illustrations were published in Smith's Weekly (up until 1931).

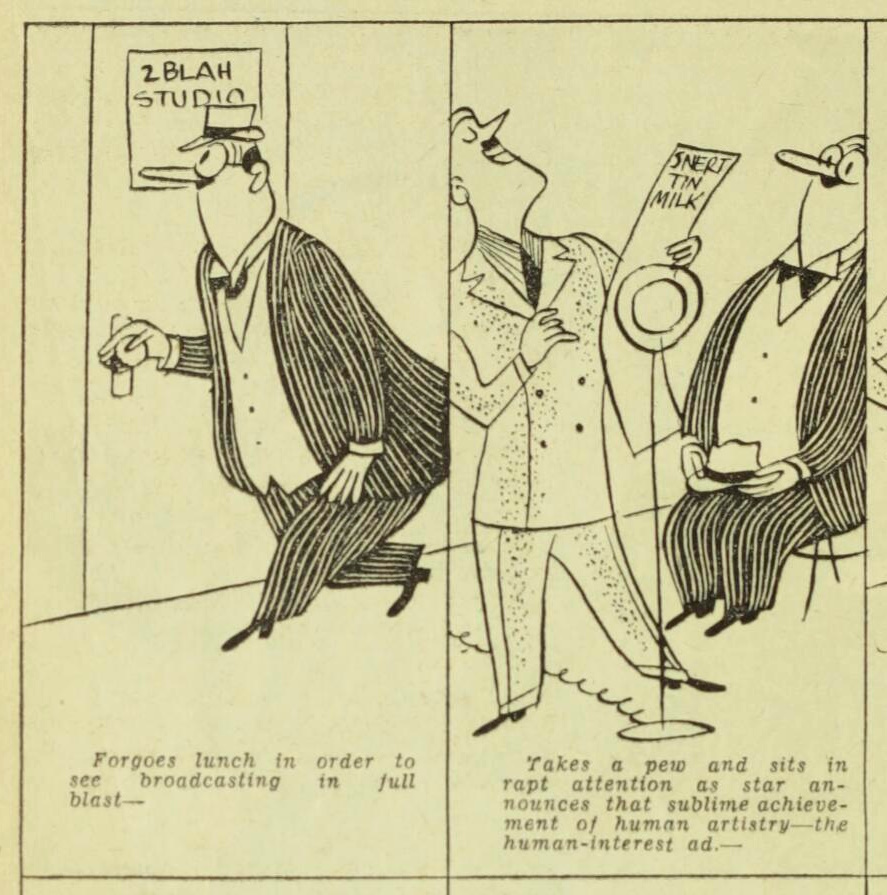
Panels from the comic strip 'The Progress of Mr. Humperdink', published in Wireless Weekly, 27 April 1934.

During the period of June 1927 to November 1929 Pidgeon served in the Citizen Naval Forces, undertaking a total of a week or two of training days throughout the year.

Pidgeon's drawings illustrated the serialised story by Edgar Wallace titled 'The India-Rubber Men', published in Adelaide's The Advertiser newspaper in February and March 1929.

During the years of the Great Depression in Australia Pidgeon increasingly turned to freelance work. He provided chapter illustrations for Here's Luck by the humorist Lennie Lower, published by Angus & Robertson in 1930. During 1931 Pidgeon contributed occasional illustrations and cartoons to Sydney's The Referee newspaper. Together with four other artists he illustrated Trio, a book of poems by Kenneth Slessor, Harley Matthews and Colin Simpson, published in 1931 as a limited edition by Sunnybrook Press. In October 1931 Pidgeon joined the staff of The World, a daily newspaper published by the Australian Workers' Union, but the newspaper had financial problems and ceased publication in November 1932. He then returned to freelance work for a number of different publications.

Pidgeon contributed cartoons to the Sunday edition of The Sun during the period April 1932 to August 1933. From November 1932 a series called 'Film Faces', of Pidgeon's caricatures of film stars, were published. In February 1933 a multi-panel series 'The Week as Seen By Wep' began to be published. In May 1933 a full-page drawing by 'Wep' was published on the front page of The Sunday Sun titled 'That Great Barrier Reef'. From July 1933 to April 1934 Pidgeon illustrated a comic strip, regularly published in Wireless Weekly, called 'The Progress of Mr. Humperdink'. He also produced covers for the magazine.

Pidgeon illustrated Colin Wills' verse collection Rhymes of Sydney, published by Frank Johnson Publications in January 1933.

On 24 August 1933 Pidgeon and Jessie Graham were married at St. Stephen's church. The couple had one son, born in 1944.

=== The Australian Women's Weekly ===
In early 1933, in collaboration with George Warnecke, Pigeon laid out the prototype print mock-up of The Australian Women's Weekly. Warnecke sold the concept to media proprietor Frank Packer who, together with Ted Theodore, launched the weekly magazine in June 1933, initially published by the company Sydney Newspapers Ltd., with Warnecke as editor.

Pigeon's illustrations were featured in various pages of the first issue of The Australian Women's Weekly, published on 10 June 1933. As well as a number of small unsigned illustrations, his cartoons and artwork appeared in a Lennie Lower humour article, an unnamed comic strip (later to become 'In and Out of Society'), a short feature called 'Our Dogs' and an illustration for a serialised story 'The Death Scream'.

Pidgeon's unnamed comic strip, published on page 10 of the first issue of the Weekly, continued in subsequent issues. By late July 1933 the comic strip began to be named, with a different title each week (including 'In and Out of Society' in the 22 July issue). In the issue of 9 September the title 'In and Out of Society' was used for a second time, but the following week the comic strip was named 'Handing Her the Palm'. From 23 September 1933 Pidgeon's comic strip was named 'In and Out of Society' on a permanent basis and published with larger panels and in a block format (rather than a horizontal sequence). The comic strip 'In and Out of Society' became extremely popular and continued through to the 1970s, later being drawn by other artists. The cartoon style that Pidgeon had developed by then was considered to be original and modern in approach and was influential with subsequent cartoon and comic strip artists. Thematically 'In and Out of Society' represented the emancipated woman, the female character dominating the narrative and with the male, via Pidgeon's gentle humour, being mostly on the receiving end.

In 1936 Pidgeon purchased a pop-top caravan and for six months he and his wife Jess travelled around New South Wales and south-east Queensland, during which Bill attempted "to develop his own style of painting".

In 1937 Pidgeon produced woodcut illustrations for the limited edition publication by Sunnybrook Press of Carboni Raffaello's The Eureka Stockade.

=== War correspondent ===
In January 1940 William and Jessie Pidgeon moved to a house in Northwood, a suburb on Sydney's lower North Shore on the Lane Cove River. Pigeon lived there for the remainder of his life.

In December 1940 a volume of cartoons by three artists employed by the Daily Telegraph – George Finey, Will Mahony and Pidgeon – was published. The 48-page collection titled War Cartoons were made of cartoons relating to the war in Europe.

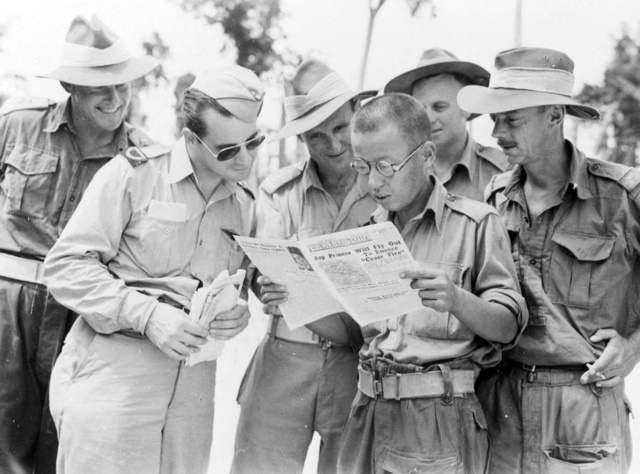
Group photograph taken at Morotai in 1945, including Corporal Komoto (POW) and William E. Pidgeon (far right).

In the latter years of World War II Pidgeon worked as a correspondent for Consolidated Press Ltd., producing many illustrations for The Australian Women's Weekly and "presenting a counterpoint to the work of the official war artists".

In June 1943 Pidgeon applied for accreditation as an official war artist and was advised he was next in line. In July he was sent to Darwin by The Women's Weekly on an assignment for two months to study and record his impressions of daily life in wartime northern Australia, in the wake of the bombing of Darwin in February 1942.

After the success of his Northern Territory assignment, Pidgeon was sent to New Guinea in January and February 1944. One of the magazine covers he painted during this period was a portrait of Sergeant Thomas ('Diver') Derrick. After his return from New Guinea Pidgeon was formally employed by Consolidated Press as a staff member for a four year period. Two other assignments as a war correspondent followed, based at Morotai Island in Indonesia during January and February 1945 and Borneo in July and August 1945, from which localities he provided commentary and artworks depicting the day-to-day life of the troops, reproduced on the covers of The Australian Women's Weekly and within its pages as well as other Consolidated Press publications.

In addition to his illustrations and war correspondent work for The Women's Weekly, Pidgeon was also the art critic for the Daily Telegraph from 1944 to 1947. He left full-time employment with The Weekly in 1949 with an agreement to do occasional work for the magazine. During his career with The Australian Women's Weekly Pidgeon produced seventy cover illustrations, the first in August 1938 featuring his wife Jess. His covers from July 1940 to April 1946 had wartime themes (except for one in July 1945 which featured his one year-old son). During the 1950s The Weekly began to focus more on photographic covers. In May 1955 Pidgeon was replaced as the cartoonist for the Sunday Telegraph by Les Tanner. Pidgeon's last painted cover for The Women's Weekly in November 1959 had a Melbourne Cup theme.

=== Portraiture ===
Disillusioned with work as a newspaper cartoonist, by the 1950s Pidgeon began to focus on painting and commissioned portraits became the main source of his livelihood over the next twenty-five years. He was a member of the Journalists' Club in Sydney and painted the portraits of practically every club president up to 1976. Some of his subjects included:

- Sydney Journalists' Club personnel: Don Angel, Arthur Crouch, Keith Newman, Syd Nicholls, Jack Paton, Con Simons, Kenneth Slessor, King Watson, Jerry Wilkes.
- E. G. Theodore (Australian politician); John Christopher Thompson (Catholic priest and educationalist); Sir William Gaston Walkley (oil company director); Fannie Whitely (family friend and brother of artist Brett Whiteley).

William's wife, Jessie Pidgeon, died in September 1952 at Northwood, aged 44. In November 1954 he was married for a second time, to Dorothy Ellen Lees. The couple had one son, born in 1959.

Pidgeon began to compete in the Archibald Prize portrait competition at the Art Gallery of New South Wales in 1949, and won the competition on three occasions. He won in 1958 with a portrait of Ray Walker, a journalist and president of the Journalists' Club. In 1961 he won for a second time with a portrait of Rabbi Israel Porush, commissioned for the Great Synagogue by a Randwick bookmaker and horse breeder. In 1968 he won the Archibald Prize competition for the third time with a study of the painter Lloyd Rees, commissioned by Lane Cove Council in March 1968 for their art collection in the town hall.

Pidgeon also enjoyed painting landscapes and other genre subjects.

In 1956 Pidgeon travelled to Romania on a cultural exchange program. In 1965 Hazel de Berg interviewed him as part of an oral history project to interview Australian artists.

Pidgeon completed his last portrait in the 1970s, compelled to discontinue with fading eyesight due to glaucoma. He had begun to suffer from glaucoma in both eyes from about 1956. The condition led to gradual deterioration of his eyesight and necessitated six operations.

=== Last years ===
Pidgeon wrote occasional art reviews for the Daily Telegraph for a number of years. He produced political cartoons for the Sunday Telegraph in 1974 and was the newspaper's art critic in the period 1974 to 1979.

In 1979 Pidgeon was hit by a car near his Northwood home.

William E. Pidgeon died "after a long illness" on 16 February 1981 at St. Leonards, aged 72 years.

== Legacy ==
In 1988 the Bloomfield Galleries in Paddington held an exhibition of Pidgeon's war paintings.

After the closure of the Journalists' Club in Sydney in 1997, it was discovered that the Archibald Prize winning painting of club president Ray Walker was missing.

In 2014 over 400 works of art by Pidgeon were donated to the Australian War Memorial. These included illustrated letters to his wife while working as a war correspondent and artist with Consolidated Press in New Guinea, Borneo, and Morotai. It also includes his War Correspondent's Licence and identification card and paintings, sketches, drawings, photographs, and other ephemeral material relating to his time as a war correspondent. The collection was one of the largest donations received by the Memorial over the previous decade and represents the most comprehensive collection of Pidgeon's work in Australia. A special exhibition of his art-work titled 'William Edwin Pidgeon (1909-1981), war correspondent and artist' was held at the Australian War Memorial in the period March 2015 to November 2016.

== Oral history ==
Pidgeon was interviewed in 1965 by Hazel de Berg about his life and career. The recording can be found at the National Library of Australia.

== Publications ==
Pidgeon was commissioned to illustrate a number of books, and in some cases book covers. All books listed were "illustrated by Wep" (unless otherwise stated):

- Colin Wills (1933), Rhymes of Sydney, Sydney: Frank Johnson Publications, ISBN 0959359214.
- Raffaello Carboni (1937), The Eureka Stockade, Mosman: Sunnybrook Press; re-issued in 1942.
- Colin Simpson (1952), Come Away, Pearler, Sydney: Angus & Robertson; jacket design by W. E. Pidgeon ('Wep').
- Marian Warren (1958), No Glamour in Gumboots, Sydney: Ure Smith.
- Nino Cullota (John O'Grady) (1959), They're a Weird Mob, Sydney: Ure Smith.
- G. C. Davy (1960), The Christian Gentleman: a Book of Courtesy and Social Guidance for Boys, Sydney: Angus & Robertson.
- Nino Cullota (John O'Grady) (1960), Cop This Lot: A Novel, Sydney: Ure Smith ISBN 0725402008.
- Cyril Pearl (1961), So, You Want to Buy a House... And Live in It, Melbourne: Cheshire.
- Nino Cullota (John O'Grady) (1962), Gone Fishin', Sydney: Ure Smith.
- Cyril Pearl (1963), The Best of Lennie Lower, Melbourne: Lansdowne.
- John O'Grady (1965), Aussie English: An Explanation of the Australian Idiom, Sydney: Ure Smith.
- John O'Grady (1966), The Things They Do to You, Sydney: Ure Smith.

== Collections ==
Pidgeon's paintings are held in the collections of the following organisations:

- Australian War Memorial
- Government House (Sydney)
- Great Synagogue
- National Library of Australia
- National Museum of Australia
- National Portrait Gallery
- New South Wales Art Gallery
- Newcastle Art Gallery
- Parliament House
- Royal Prince Alfred Hospital
- State Library New South Wales
- St Vincent's Hospital Sydney
- Sydney Children's Hospital
- University of New England
- University of New South Wales
- University of Sydney

== Gallery ==
A selection of images by William E. Pidgeon
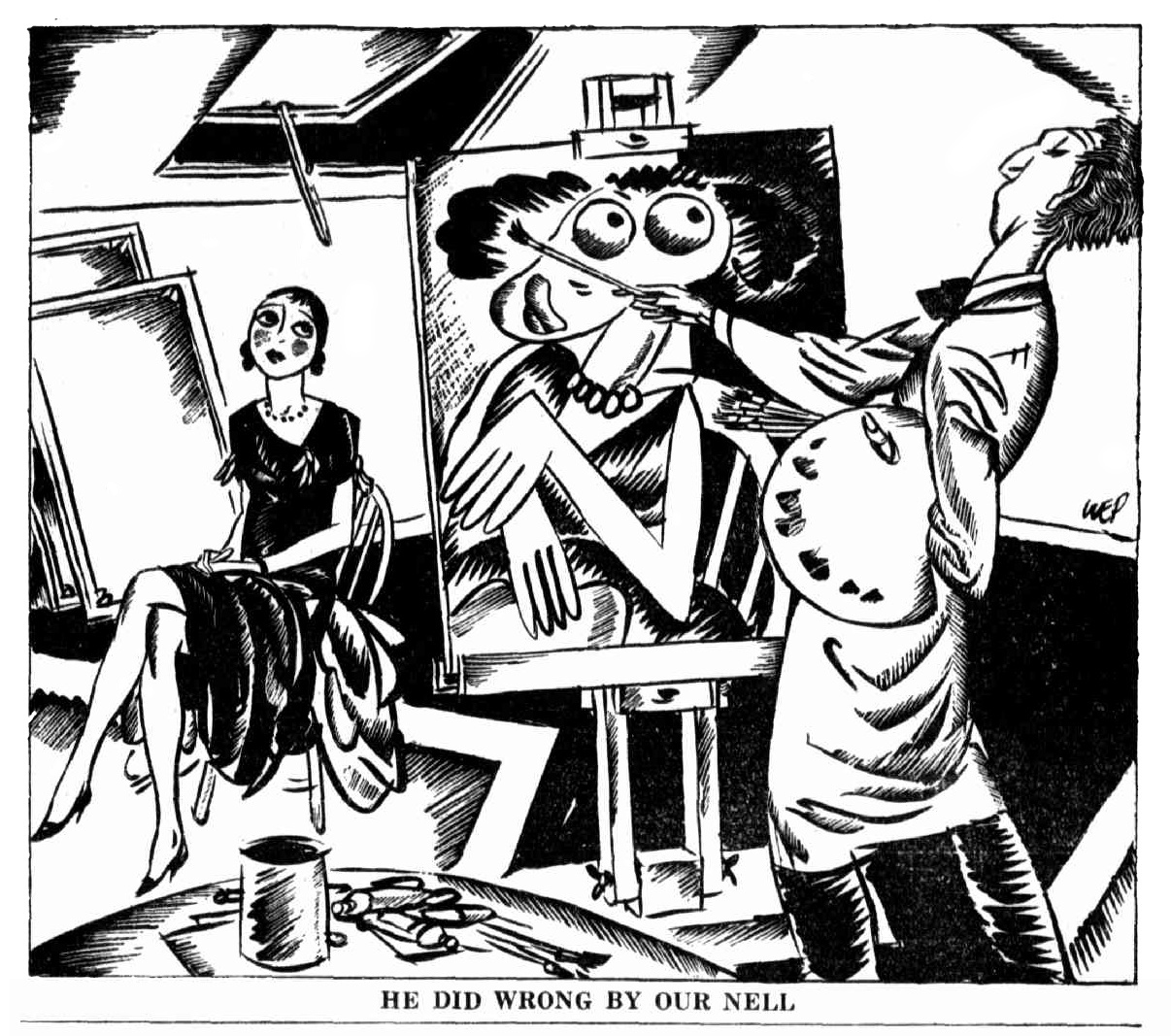
'He Did Wrong By Our Nell', published in Smith's Weekly, 25 April 1931.

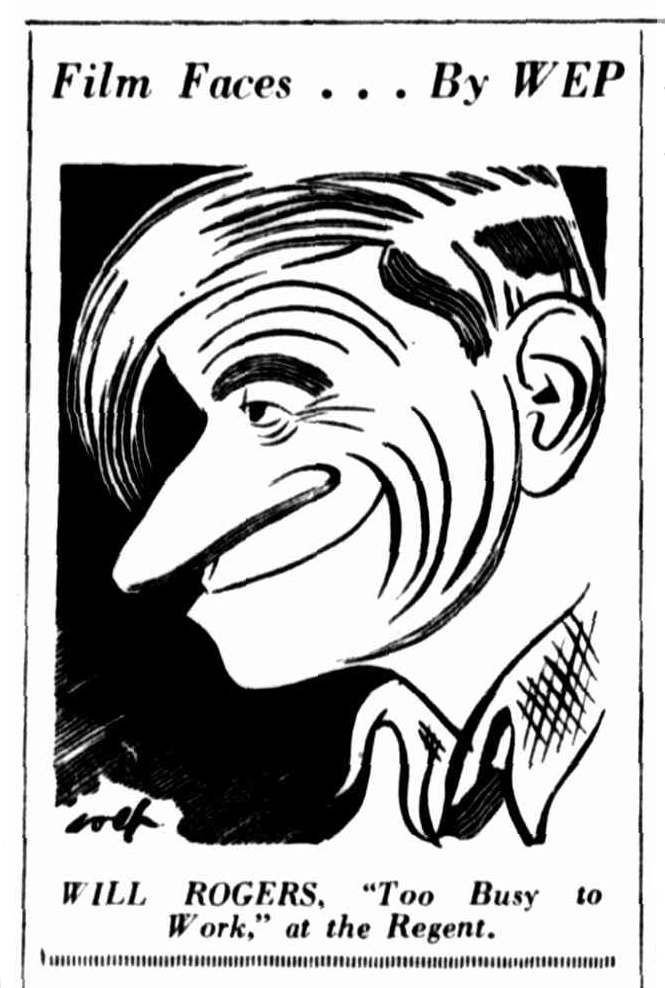
Caricature of Will Rogers, published in The Sun (Sydney), 8 January 1933.

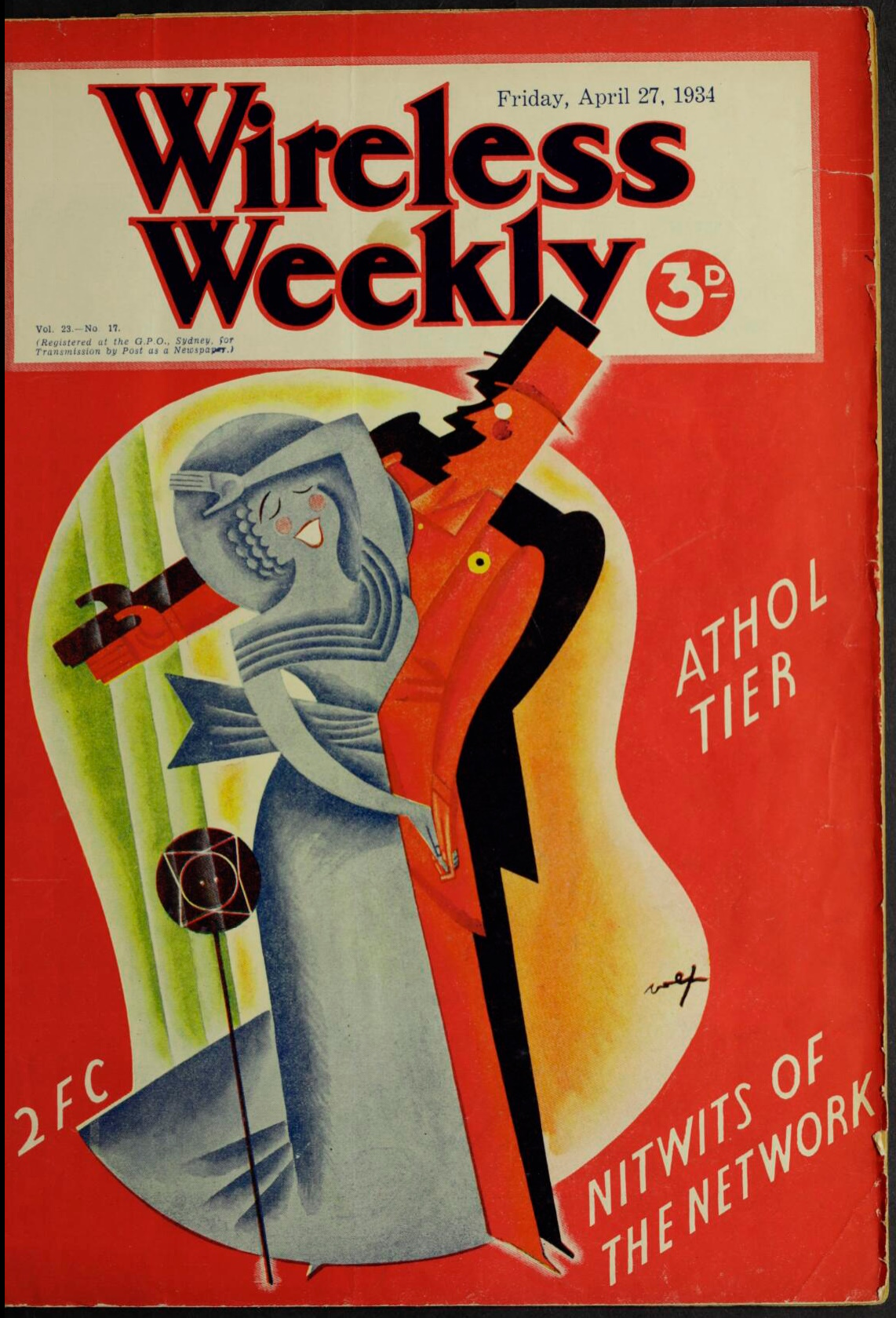
Cover of Wireless Weekly, 27 April 1934.

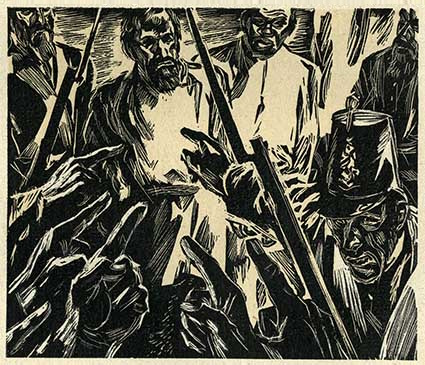
Woodcut illustration in Eureka Stockade by Raffaello Carboni, published by Sunnybrook Press (1937).

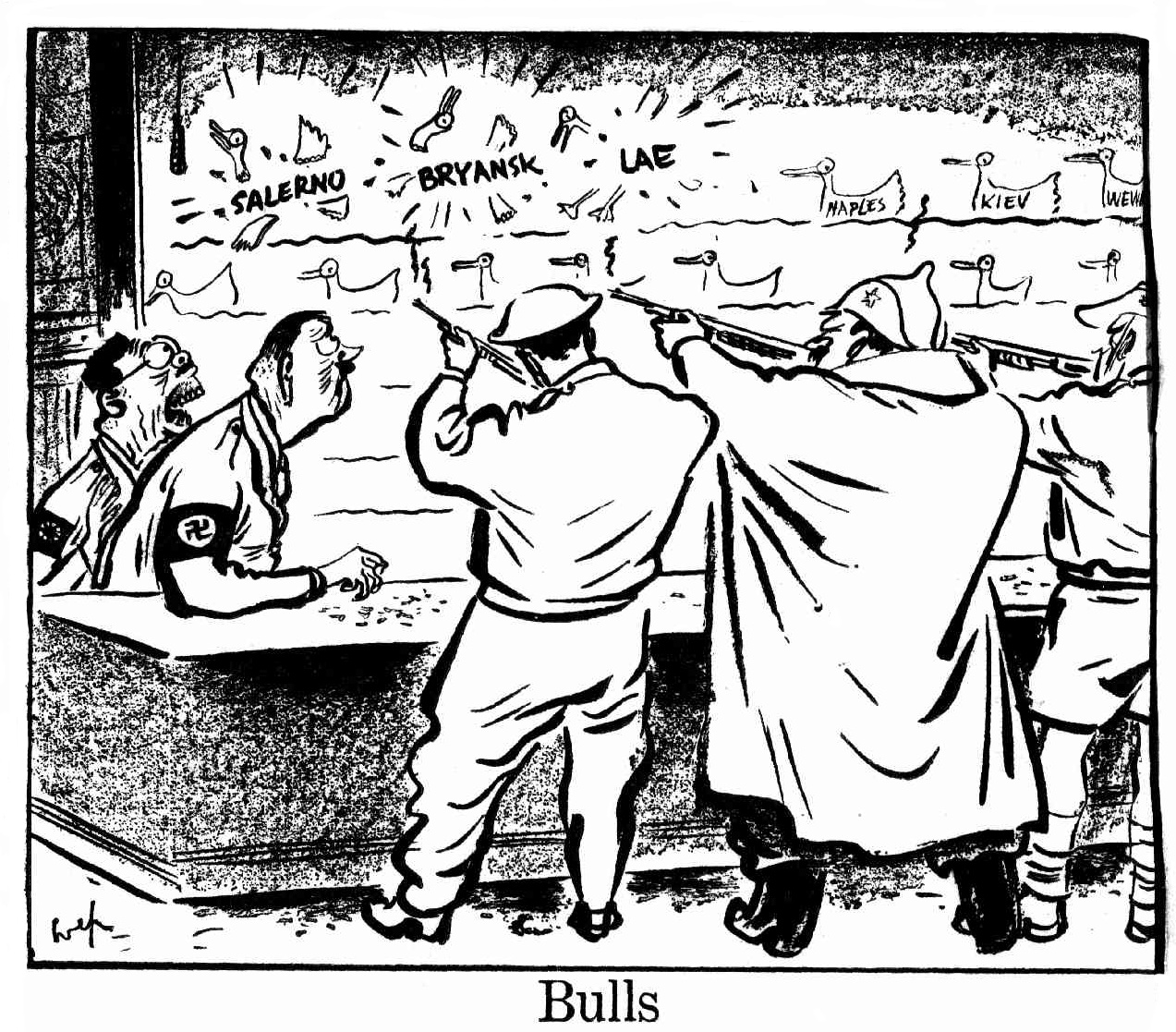
'Bulls', published in Daily Telegraph, 19 September 1943 (including caricatures of Hideki Tojo and Adolf Hitler).

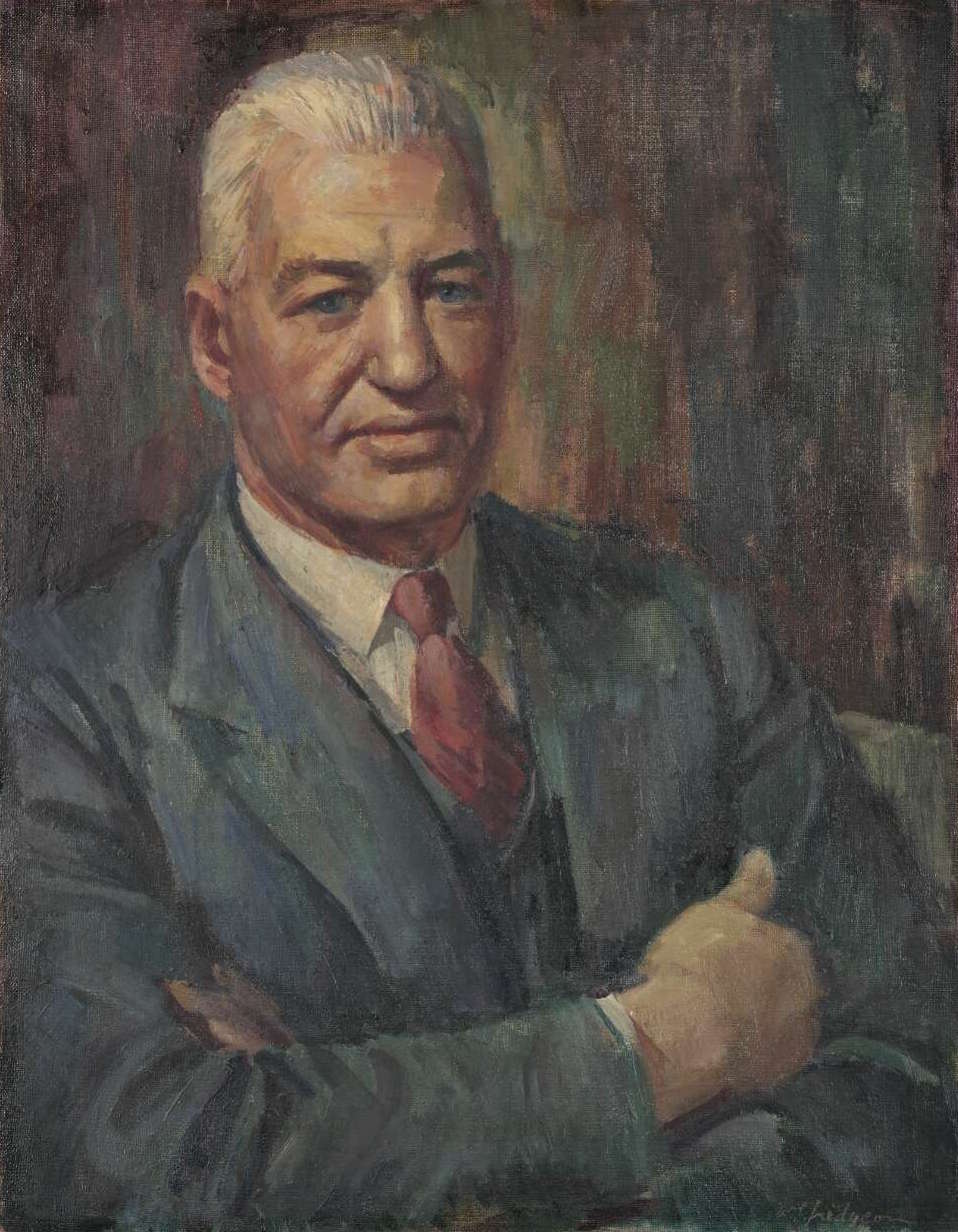
Portrait of E. G. Theodore c. 1945 (collection of the National Library of Australia).

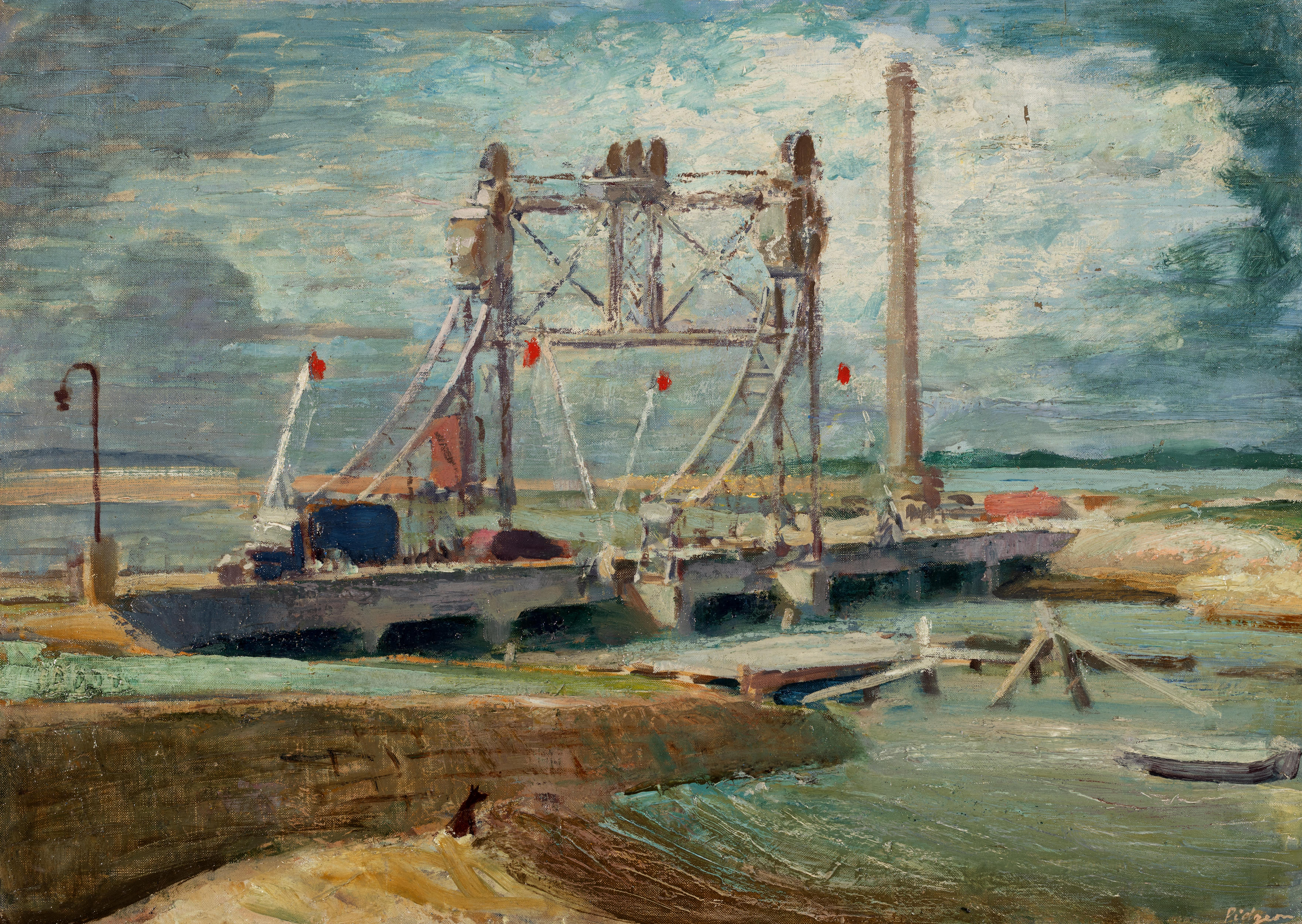
'Old Cooks River Bridge', oil painting (1950); collection of the Maitland Regional Art Gallery.

Awards
| Preceded by Ivor Hele | Archibald Prize; 1958 for Mr. Ray Walker | Succeeded by William Dobell |
| Preceded by Judy Cassab | Archibald Prize; 1961 for Rabbi Dr. I. Porush | Succeeded by Louis Kahan |
| Preceded by Judy Cassab | Archibald Prize; 1968 for Lloyd Rees | Succeeded by Ray Crooke |
