= Art, Life and the other thing =

1978 painting by Brett Whiteley

Art, Life, and the other thing is an Archibald Prize-winning 1978 painting by Australian artist Brett Whiteley which combines three different media in a triptych.

== Work components ==
=== Art ===
The middle canvas depicts Brett Whiteley himself standing side-on to the onlooker, his head in motion and his hands grasping. In one hand, a black-and-white image of Joshua Smith by William Dobell; in the other, a paint brush, as he is painting this picture. His body runs vertically to the canvas with the left hand side being almost empty. The features of the figure are disoriented and exaggerated especially in the head, where Whiteley is showing movement. Because of this movement, the head appears very abstract. The arms, legs and torso are unrealistically long and lanky. The body is clothed in a two-piece outfit, all in white. As the head turns it becomes more real and solid, going from a mass of blurred lines on the left to being almost photo-realistic on the right. To add to the realism, Whiteley had added his own hair to the piece on the right-hand side. The background colour is light orange.

The William Dobell painting. Mr Joshua Smith, won the 1943 Archibald Prize.

=== Life ===
The third and last component of the triptych is a small headshot photograph of Brett Whiteley himself. It is on the far right, in the top-left corner of the piece and is the smallest component. The picture is cut off just below Whiteley's chin. The subject is smiling and in a thoughtful expression, his eyes are focused on something past the viewer, to our right (his left). His hair looks messy, revealing it not to be a formal photograph. The background colour is light orange.

=== Other Thing ===
The left-hand part of the triptych is a medium-sized oil painting on canvas done in warm, earthy colours, such as browns, oranges, yellows and reds. It depicts a crazed baboon, shackled and chained with cuts and wounds caused by the nails sticking into its hands and wrists. The baboon is clearly in motion, struggling with the extreme pain and torment. Its eyes are wild and its mouth is gaping. The baboon occupies most of the painting, but it is not a real-to-life/realistic painting, but distorted to accentuate its features. In the top left-hand corner there is a hand, palm outstretched, offering the baboon a syringe. The baboon's hands are human. There is nothing in the background.

This section is probably the most revealing on Brett Whiteley's life at the time. The tormented baboon is the symbolisation of his battle with drug addiction, in particular, heroin. The nails in its hands and the frenzied desperation of the creatures canvas in this part is the largest in size.

== Summary ==
This work is controversial, rich and portrays many aspects of the painter. Brett Whiteley uses many media, such as: painting, photography, drawing, sculpture and even melds his own hair onto the piece. His drawing is exaggerated with very expressive features and the artist places a large emphasis on the visualization of motion. This is evident in this piece and in his other works.

== Basic information ==
(Triptych) Oil, glass eye, hair, pen and ink on cardboard, plaster, photography, oil, dried PVA, cigarette butts, hypodermic syringe on board, 90.4 x 77.2, 230 x 122, 31.1 x 31.1 cm; signed and dated in black ink 1.r. 'brett Whiteley 1978', signed verso in black oil on masking tape 'BRETT WHITELEY'

Inscriptions: u.r. in black ink 'rage/rage/against the dying of the light/ DYLAN THOMAS'. Inscribed 2nd panel on verso on paper 'hanging instruction for Art, Life and The Other Thing'

Exhibited: 'Archibald, Wynne and Sulman', The Art Gallery of New South Wales, 1978 awarded Archibald Prize. Greenhill Galleries, Perth, 1987, not catalogued

Literature: Waldmann 1982, pp. 213–36. Hunt 1994.

Collection: Art Gallery of New South Wales. Purchased by the New South Wales State Government 1994, transferred to the Gallery 1998
