= Henri's Armchair =

1974 painting by Brett Whiteley

- Artist: Brett Whiteley
- Year: 1974
- Medium: oil, ink and charcoal on canvas
- Dimensions: 195 cm × 302 cm (77 in × 119 in)
- Location: Private collection

Henri's Armchair is a 1974 painting by Australian artist Brett Whiteley. The work depicts the interior of Whiteley's house looking out towards Sydney Harbour and is part of the artist's Lavender Bay series. The work is named after Henri Matisse, an artist that Whiteley admired.

Whiteley sold the work to lawyer and art dealer Clive Evatt. Evatt described it as "Whiteley's finest painting". The painting has been part of several exhibitions including the Art Gallery of New South Wales Brett Whiteley studio.

In November 2020, Evatt's widow offered the painting for sale by auction. The painting sold to a private collector for a hammer price of AUD6.136m — at the time a record price for an Australian artwork at auction.
