= Lloyd Rees =

Australian landscape painter (1895–1988)

Lloyd Rees, AC, CMG
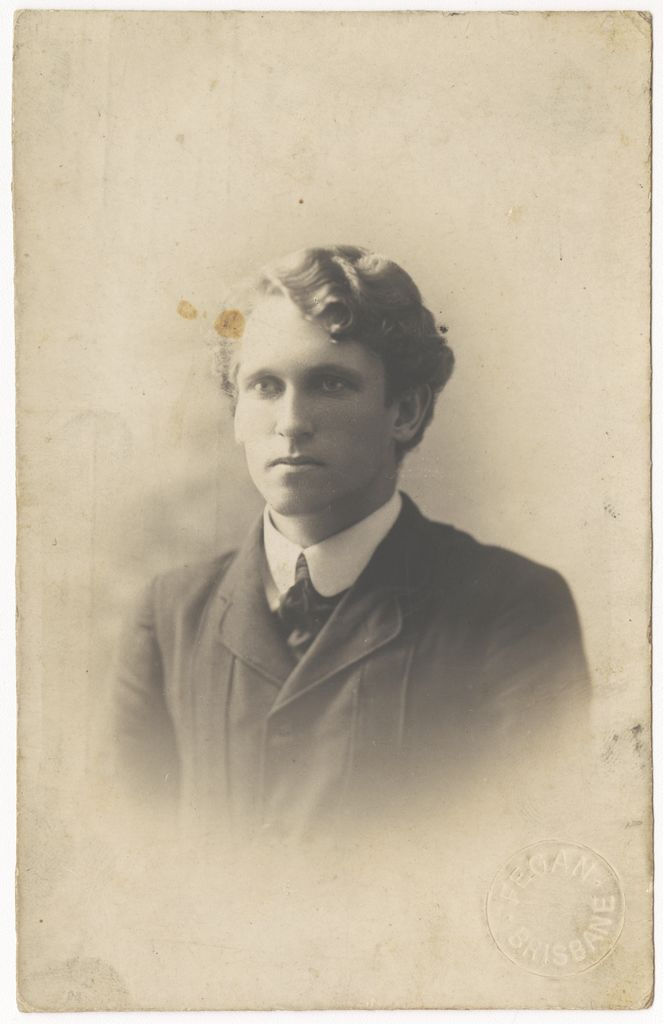
- Lloyd Rees, 1916
- Born: 17 March 1895; Yeronga, Brisbane, Colony of Queensland
- Died: 2 December 1988 (aged 93); Hobart, Tasmania, Australia
- Known for: Painting

Lloyd Frederic Rees AC CMG (17 March 1895 – 2 December 1988) was an Australian landscape painter who twice won the Wynne Prize for his landscape paintings.

Most of Rees's works are preoccupied with depicting the effects of light and emphasis is placed on the harmony between man and nature. Rees's oeuvre is dominated by sketches and paintings, in which the most frequent subject is the built environment in the landscape.

== Early life and education ==
Rees was born in Brisbane, Colony of Queensland, the seventh of eight children of Owen Rees and his wife Angèle Burguez, who was half Mauritian, half Cornish.

Rees attended Ironside State School and Ithaca Creek State School in Brisbane's inner west. After formal art training at Brisbane's Central Technical College, he commenced work as a commercial artist in 1917.

== Early career ==
From the 1940s until the 1960s, Rees was part of the Northwood group, a small group of friends who would go on painting excursions around Sydney Harbour and northwestern Sydney. Regulars of the Northwood group were Lloyd Rees, Roland Wakelin, George Feather Lawrence and John Santry. Douglas Dundas, Wilmotte Williams and Marie Santry also associated with the Northwood group. These artists had no manifesto but were conservative, tending towards a neoimpressionist style of landscape painting with sinuous linework. In 1937 Rees became a foundation member of, and exhibited with, Robert Menzies' anti-modernist organisation, the Australian Academy of Art.

In the 1960s, the Northwood Group was active during the modishness of Sydney abstract expressionism, their noted contemporaries were the Merioola Group and stalwart Melbourne postwar voices of disquiet such as Sidney Nolan and the Antipodeans. By the 1970s a young postmodern art scene emerged in Gallery A, Macquarie Galleries, and Watters Gallery. Celebrated painter Brett Whiteley was a member of this younger generation rediscovering the now elderly painter and drawer Lloyd Rees.

The studio had a big window, which you passed when walking up the front of the house to the iron gates at the arched entrance. The window was splashed with paint because Lloyd would stand in front of his wet painting holding half a gallon of turps in one hand and put his other hand into the turps and throw it over the painting. As it ran down the painting, washing color with it, he would pick up a cloth and wipe back the selected areas. If you look carefully at his paintings of the eighties you will see where the paint has been handled in this fashion .

— John Santry, John Santry, An Autobiography

Friend and Northwood resident William Pidgeon painted Lloyd Rees' portrait which won the 1968 Archibald Prize.

== Europe ==
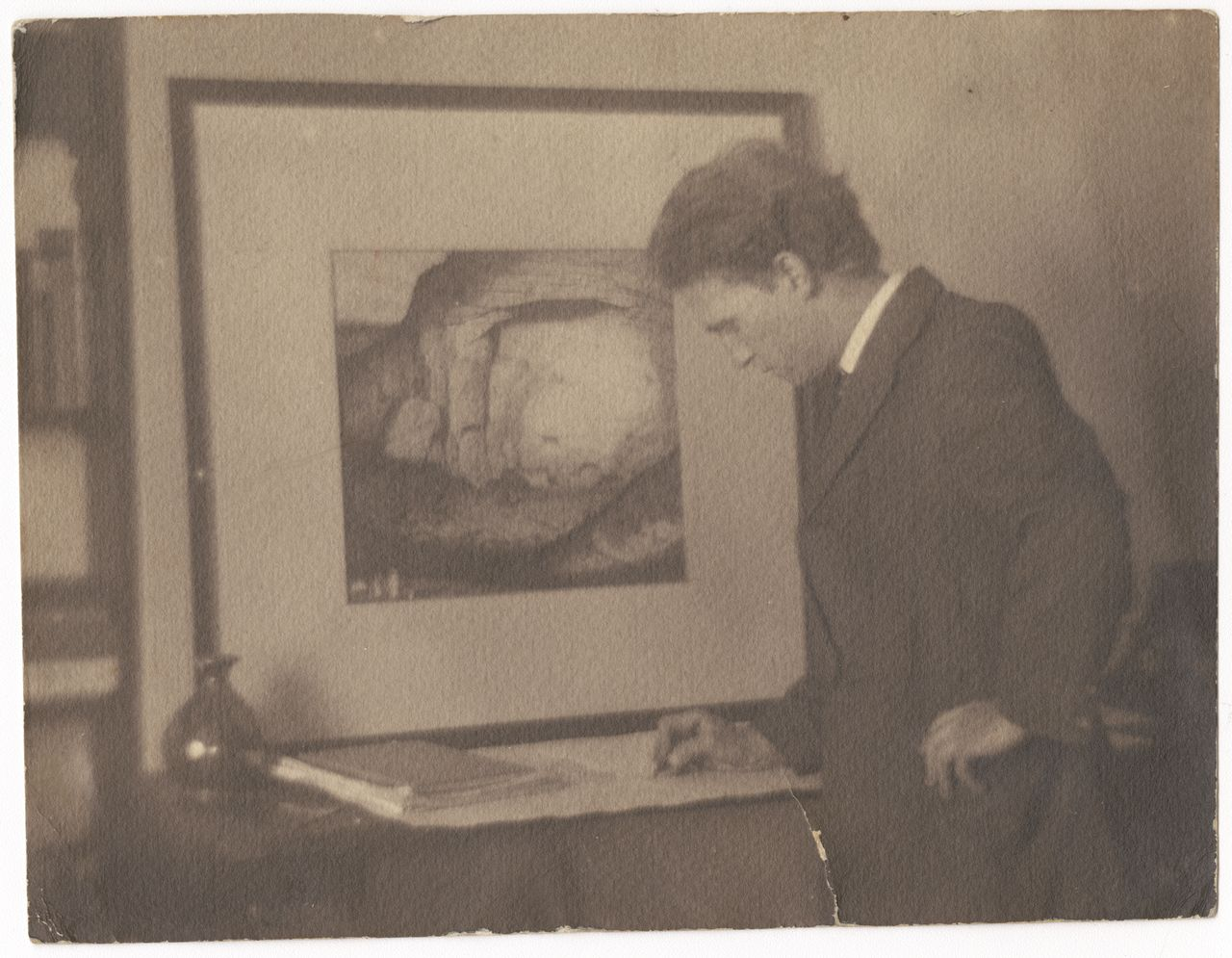
Lloyd Rees sketching

Rees first travelled to Europe in the 1920s (to meet with his then fiancée Daphne Mayo) and made sketches, including many of Paris, which were left accidentally on a bus in London at that time. While some of his works — and indeed his betrothal to Mayo — were lost, his connection with the landscapes of town and country France and Italy was to last a lifetime. Rees visited Europe again in 1953, 1959, 1966–67 and 1973, painting and sketching on all of his journeys.

The sketchbooks are now held by the Art Gallery of New South Wales, comprising approximately 700 images in pencil, carbon pencil, wash, watercolour and ballpoint pen. They reveal a capacity to characterize the texture and light of landscapes in these brief media — concerns that are equally evident in his paintings throughout his career.

== Late works ==
Rees painted right up to his death at age 93. His works of the last one to two decades in particular showed a preoccupation with the spiritual dimension of the relationship with and portrayal of the landscape, and this became the focus of the final book prepared in cooperation with the author Renée Free: Lloyd Rees: the last twenty years.

His late works show an abstraction of form and a focus on the source and effects of light on the landscape, such as in his work The Sunlit Tower, painted when he was 91 years old, and winner of the Jack Manton Prize for 1987 (a prize awarded by the Queensland Art Gallery). He claimed that one of the benefits of his failing eyesight in his old age was that he could look directly at the sun.

Rees's own philosophical views he expressed in the Epilogue to their book:

From quite an early age I was overwhelmed with the fact of endlessness... Planetary systems can blow up, but the universe is endless, and our little life is set in the midst of this, and everything in it has a beginning and an end... [This] gives to life a sense of mystery that is always with me.

== Personal life and death ==
Rees was engaged to sculptor Daphne Mayo, but it was broken off in 1925. He married Dulcie Metcalfe in 1926. In 1927, Dulcie died in childbirth and Rees married again, in 1931, to Marjory Pollard, mother to his son Alan.

Rees' wife died on 14 April 1988 and he died on 2 December of the same year. Following Rees's death, Alan Rees and his wife Jancis gave to the Art Gallery of NSW all of Rees's surviving sketchbooks.

== Honours ==
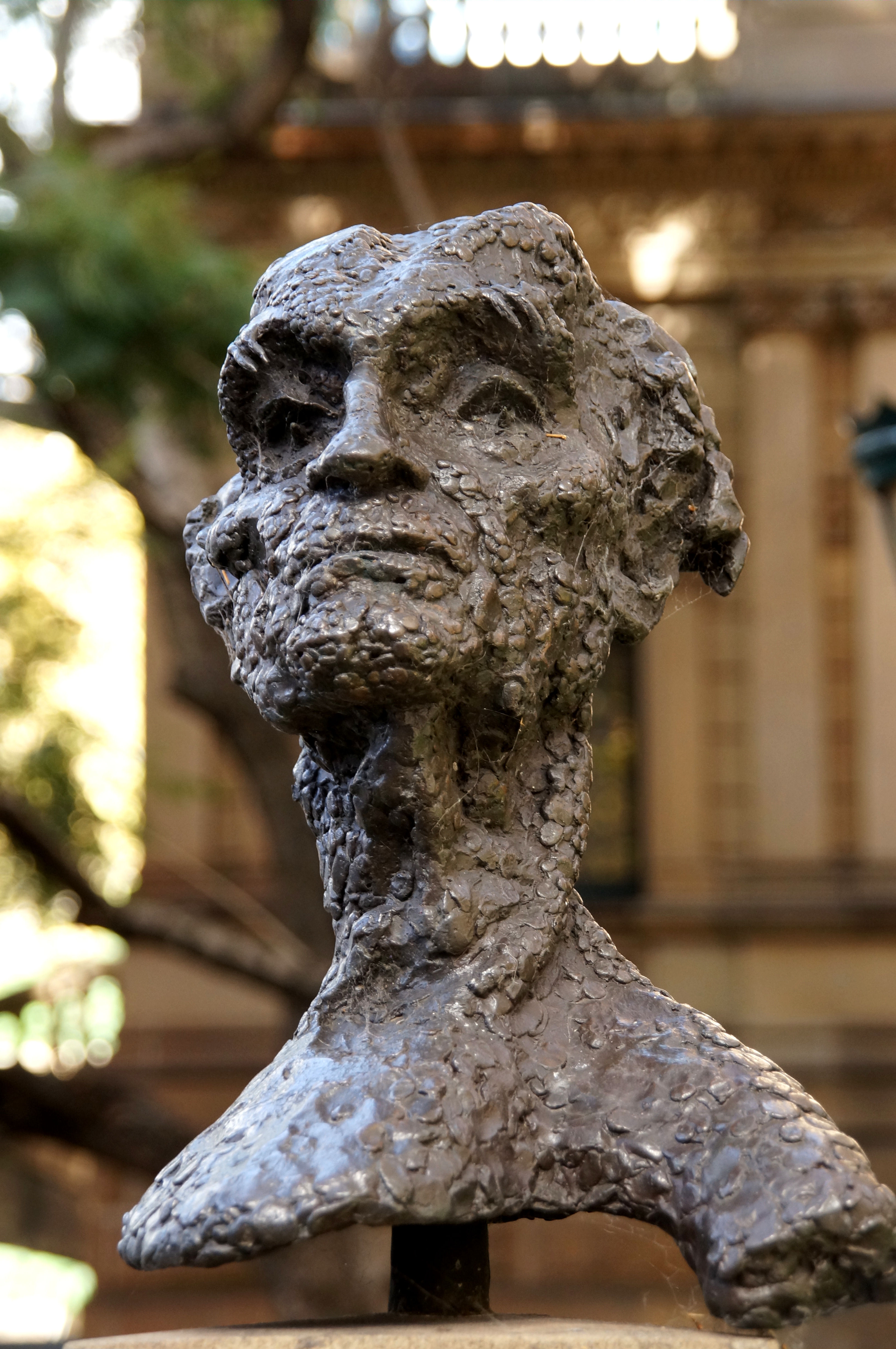
Sculpture of Lloyd Rees by Lawrence Beck at the Town Hall of Sydney, Australia

Rees won the Wynne Prize in 1950 and 1982. He also won the Commonwealth Jubilee Art Prize in 1957 and in 1971 he won the John McCaughey Memorial Art Prize and the International Cooperation Art Award.

Rees was appointed a Companion of the Order of St Michael and St George (CMG) in 1978 and Australia's highest civilian honour, Companion of the Order of Australia (AC) in 1985.

He was awarded the Médaille de la Ville de Paris in 1987 in honour of his artistic achievements.

For forty years, from 1946 to 1986, Rees taught art with Sydney University's Faculty of Architecture and in 1988 received the Sydney University Union Medal for his contributions to art and the University. In the same year he was named as one of the Australian Bicentennial Authority's Two hundred people who made Australia great.

== Collections ==
- Art Gallery of New South Wales
- Art Gallery of Western Australia
- Bathurst Regional Art Gallery
- Darling Harbour Authority
- Parliament House, Canberra
- National Gallery of Australia
- Newcastle Art Gallery
- Queensland Art Gallery
- Royal Australian College of Physicians
- Tasmanian Museum and Art Gallery
- University of Sydney
- University of Western Australia
- West Australian Institute of Technology

== Footnotes ==
=== References ===
- Edward Duyker, ‘Lloyd Rees: Artist and Teacher’, Arts: The Journal of the Sydney University Arts Association, vol. 30, 2008, pp. 34–53.
- Renée Free, Lloyd Rees, Landsdowne, Melbourne, 1972
- Renée Free and Lloyd Rees, Lloyd Rees: The Last Twenty Years, Craftsman House, Sydney, 1990
- Janet Hawley, 'Lloyd Rees: the final interview', Sydney Morning Herald - Good Weekend Magazine, 15 October 1988
- Lou Klepac, Lloyd Rees Drawings, Australian Artist Editions, Sydney, 1978
- Hendrik Kolenberg, Lloyd Rees in Europe, Art Gallery of NSW, Sydney, 2002
- Lloyd Rees, Peaks and valleys: an autobiography, Collins, Sydney, 1985
