= Brett Whiteley =

Australian artist (1939–1992)

Brett Whiteley AO
- Born: 7 April 1939; Sydney, New South Wales, Australia
- Died: 15 June 1992 (aged 53); Thirroul, New South Wales, Australia
- Education: Julian Ashton Art School
- Known for: Visual arts
- Movement: Avant-garde
- Spouse: Wendy Whiteley (m. 1962, div. 1989)
- Awards: Biennale de Paris – International Prize for Young Artists; 1962; Archibald Prize; 1976 Self Portrait in the Studio; 1978 Art, Life and the other thing Wynne Prize; 1977 The Jacaranda Tree (On Sydney Harbour); 1978 Summer at Carcoar; 1984 The South Coast After Rain; Sulman Prize; 1976 Interior with Time Past; 1978 Yellow Nude

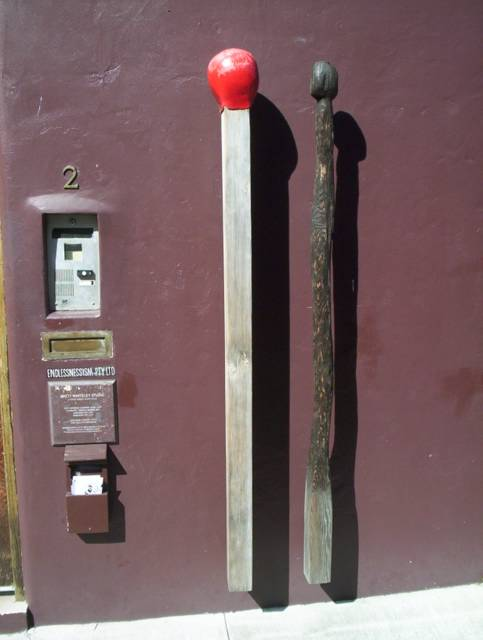
Front of the Brett Whiteley gallery in Surry Hills, Sydney

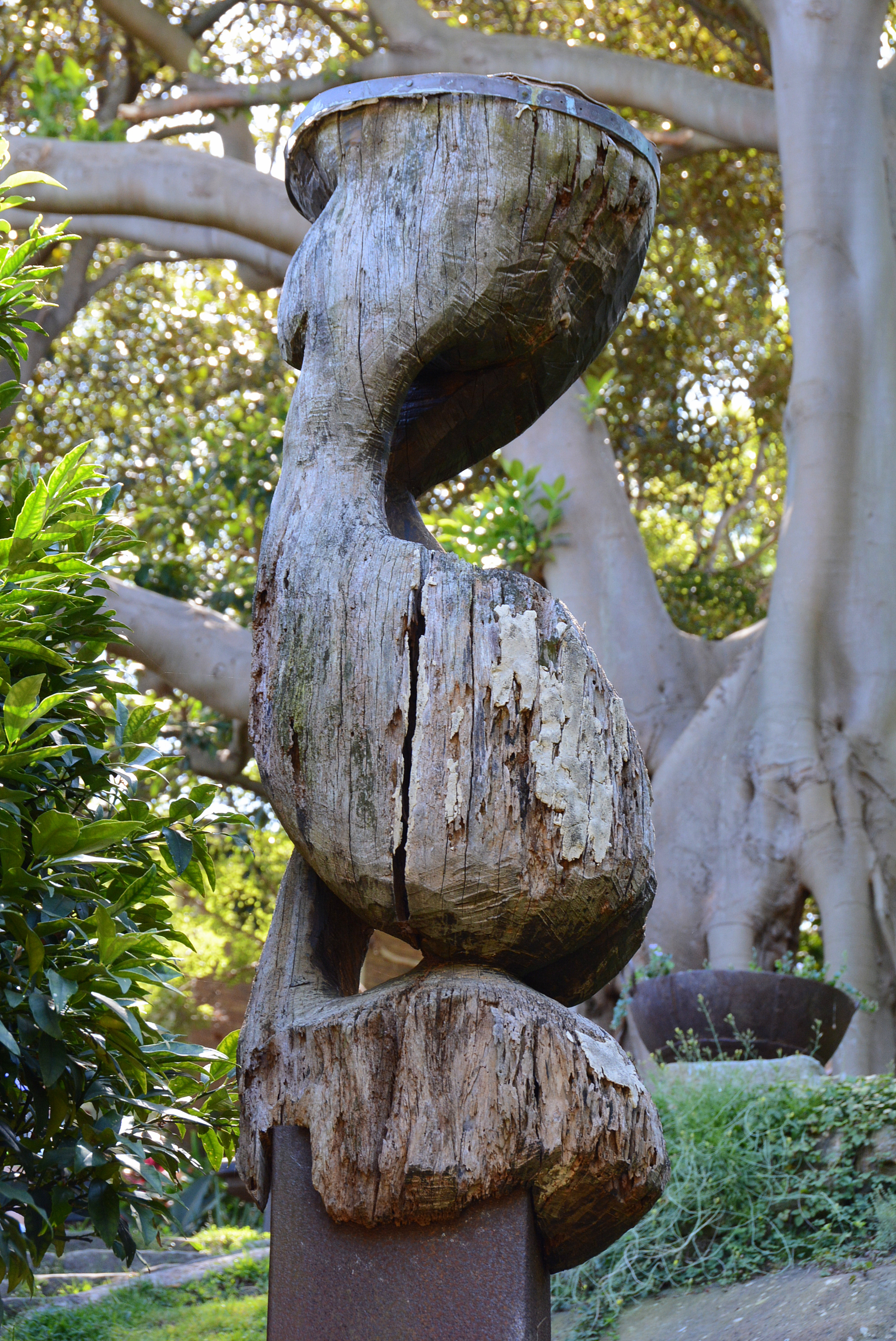
Whiteley's sculpture, Nude (1962)

Brett Whiteley (7 April 1939 – 15 June 1992) was an Australian artist. He is represented in the collections of all the large Australian galleries, and was twice winner of the Archibald, Wynne and Sulman prizes. He held many exhibitions, and lived and painted in Australia as well as Italy, the United Kingdom, Fiji and the United States.

== Early years ==
Growing up in Longueville, a suburb of Sydney, Whiteley was educated at The Scots School, Bathurst and The Scots College, Bellevue Hill. He started drawing at a very early age. While he was a teenager, he painted on weekends in the Central West of New South Wales and Canberra with such works as The soup kitchen (1958). Throughout 1956 to 1959 at the National Art School in East Sydney, Whiteley attended drawing classes.

While still at school, Whiteley visited the Macquarie Galleries and saw a one-man exhibition of the work of the landscape artist Lloyd Rees. Much later, in 1988, Whiteley wrote to Rees, who had been his friend and mentor for many years. He recalled landscapes that

seemed to have filtered and dredged the whole of Europe through them. They contained nature and ideas, they contained naturalism but seemed also very invented, and the adventure of them was that they showed the decisions and revisions that had been made while they were painted. I had never seen anything like that before... it set me on a path of discovery that I am still on today - namely that change, and particularly change of pace in a painting is where the poetry gets born.

As a result of this encounter with Rees's work, Whiteley was able to meet Rees and join an evening sketch group organised by John Santry.

In 1959, he won an art scholarship sponsored by the Italian government and judged by Russell Drysdale. He left Australia for Europe on 23 January 1960.

== London ==
After meeting Bryan Robertson, the director of the Whitechapel Gallery, Whiteley was included in the 1961 group show 'Recent Australian Painting,' where his Untitled red painting was bought by the Tate Gallery. He was the youngest living artist to have work purchased by the Tate, a record that still stands. In 1962, Whiteley married Wendy Julius. Their only child, daughter Arkie Whiteley, was born in London in 1964. While in London, Whiteley painted works in several different series: bathing, the zoo and the Christies. His paintings during these years were influenced by the modernist British art of the sixties – particularly the works of William Scott and Roger Hilton – and were of brownish abstract forms. It was these abstract works which led to him being recognised as an artist, at a time when many other Australian artists were exhibiting in London, but from 1963 he moved away from abstraction towards figuration. His farewell to abstraction, Summer at Sigean, was a record of his honeymoon in France. He painted Woman in bath (1963) as part of a series of works he was doing of bathroom pictures. It has primarily black on one side and has an image of his wife Wendy in a bathtub, seen from behind. Another in the series was a more abstracted Woman in the bath II, which owed a debt to his yellow and red abstract paintings of the early sixties.

In 1964, while in London, Whiteley became fascinated by the murderer John Christie, who had committed murders in the area near where Whiteley was staying in Ladbroke Grove. He painted a series of paintings based on these events, including Head of Christie. Whiteley's intention was to portray the violence of the events, but not to go too far in showing something which people would not want to see. During this time, Whiteley also painted works based on the animals at the London Zoo, such as Two Indonesian giraffes, which he found sometimes difficult. As he said: "To draw animals, one has to work at white heat because they move so much, and partly because it is sometimes painful to feel what one guesses the animal 'feels' from inside." (Whiteley 1979: 1) Whiteley also made images of the beach, such as his yellowish painting and collage work The beach II, which he painted on a brief visit to Australia before his return to London and his winning of a fellowship to America. Whiteley appears as a character in the book Falling Towards England by Clive James under the name Dibbs Buckley. His wife Wendy appears as "Delish".

== New York ==
In 1967, Whiteley won a Harkness Fellowship Scholarship to study and work in New York. He met other artists and musicians while he lived at the Hotel Chelsea, where he befriended musicians Janis Joplin and Bob Dylan. His first impression of New York was shown in the painting First sensation of New York City, which showed streets with fast moving vehicles, street signs, hot dog vendors, and tall buildings. The Hotel Chelsea displayed several of Whiteley's paintings from the time he lived there, including Portrait of New York which was hung behind the reception desk.

One way that America influenced him is in the scale of his works. He was very much influenced by the peace movement at the time and came to believe that if he painted one huge painting which would advocate peace, then the Americans would withdraw their troops from Vietnam. Whiteley became active in the great peace movements of the 1960s, with the protests against America's involvement in the war in Vietnam. The resulting work was called The American dream, an enormous work that used painting and collage and anything else he could find on the 18 wooden panels. It took a great deal of his time and effort, taking about a year of full-time work. It started with a peaceful, dreamlike, serene ocean scene on one side, that worked its way to destruction and chaos in a mass of lighting, red colours and explosions on the other side. It was his comment on the direction the world might be headed and his response to a seemingly pointless war which could end in a nuclear holocaust. Many of the ideas from the work may have come from his experiences with alcohol, marijuana and other drugs. He believed that many of his ideas came from these experiences, and he often used drugs as a way of bringing the ideas from his subconscious. He sometimes took more than his body could handle, and had to be admitted to hospital for alcohol poisoning twice. Around him at the Hotel Chelsea, other artists and musicians took heroin, which Whiteley did not take at that time. The painting which was finally produced was made of a fantastic array of elements, including collage, photography and even flashing lights, with a total length of nearly 22 metres. However Marlborough-Gerson, his gallery, refused to show the work, and he was so distraught that he decided to leave New York, and he 'fled' to Fiji.

== Appropriations ==
One image which uses van Gogh's style in a unique way is The night café (1971–72). He took the van Gogh painting and stretched the lines of the room to a single vanishing point, creating an image which appears fast moving and extremely vibrant and dynamic.

== Alchemy ==
Part of his work Alchemy (1972–73) was featured on the cover of the Dire Straits live album Alchemy although it had the addition of a guitar with lips held by a hand. Alchemy is the mythical ancient process of turning ordinary compounds into gold. The original painting, done between 1972 and 1973 was composed of many different elements and on 18 wood panels 203 cm × 1615 cm × 9 cm. Reading from left to right, it begins with an exploding sun from a portrait of Yukio Mishima that Whiteley had started but never completed. The famed author Mishima had committed seppuku in 1970 and the literary mythology that arose of his apparent final vision of enlightenment in the form of the exploding sun, as he pressed the knife into his body, inspired and became the basis for this work. In terms of media, it used everything from feathers and part of a bird's nest to a glass eye, as well as shell pieces, plugs and brain in a work that becomes a transmutation of sexual organic landscapes and mindscapes. It has been regarded as a self-portrait, a giant outpouring of energy and ideas brought forth over a long period of time. According to art writer Bruce James, the self-conscious inclusion of the austere pronoun 'IT' that also makes up part of the work compacts life, passion, death and faith in a single empowering word and unites the notional wings of an altarpiece to nascent addiction.

== Sydney Harbour and landscapes ==
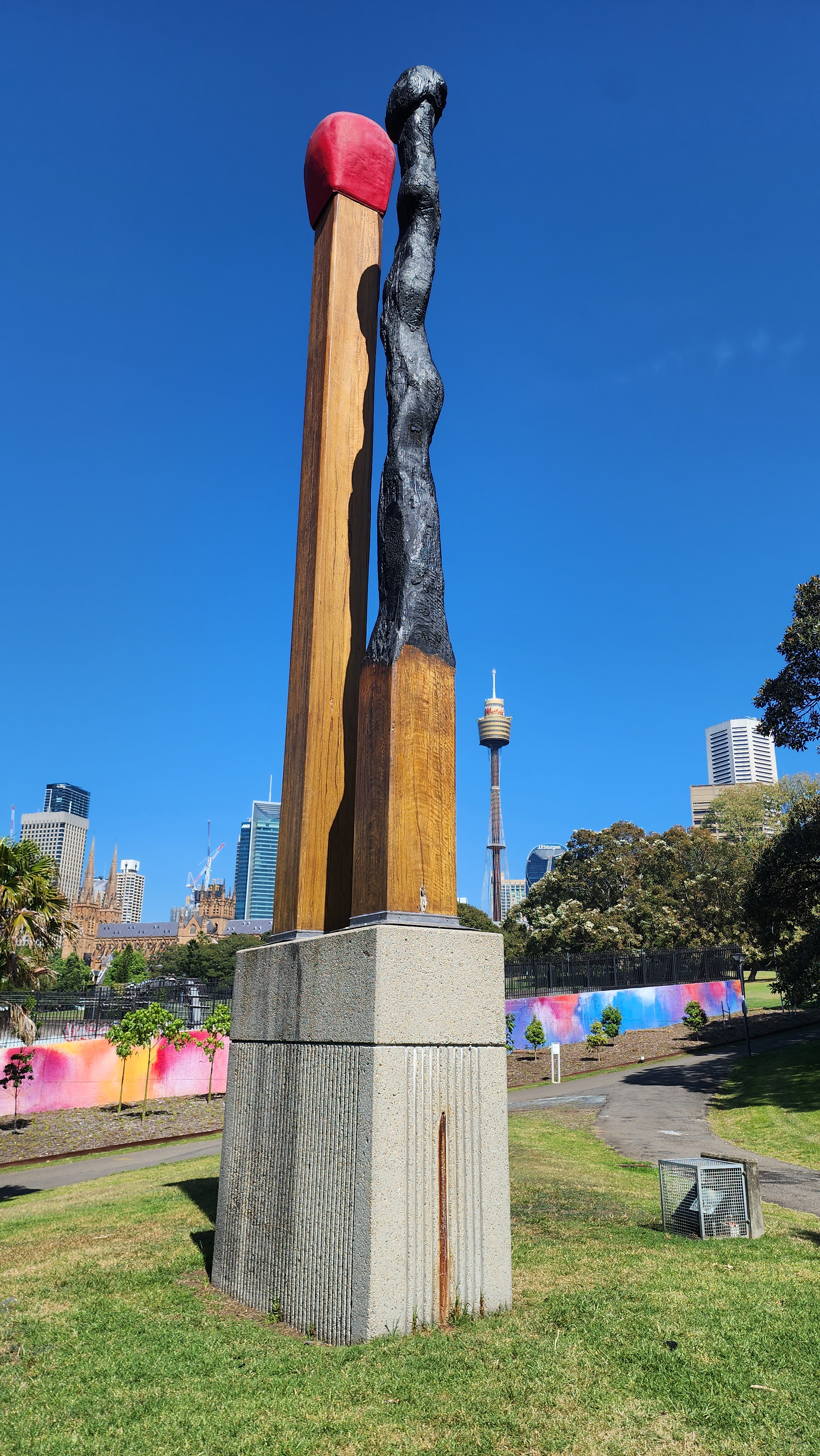
Almost Once (1991), The Domain, Sydney

Whiteley loved painting Sydney Harbour views in the 1970s such as in his paintings, Henri's Armchair (1974) The balcony 2 (1975) and Interior with time past (1976), which show an interior and exterior view starting with a room that leads through open windows to the harbour full of boats outside. In the latter painting, the table in the front of the room close to the viewer has minutely decorated vases and small objects, while a drawing on the left and a sculpture to the extreme right show how Whiteley often used erotic images in his works. He painted a view of his friend Patrick White as a rock or a headland in Headland; White had told Whiteley that in the next life he would like to come back as a rock. Whiteley painted other images of the Australian landscape, including a view of the south coast of New South Wales after it had been raining called The South Coast after rain.

He did paintings of the areas around Bathurst, Oberon and Marulan, all in New South Wales. He soon settled in Lavender Bay. He painted abstracted images of bush scenes such as The bush (1966) and also images which resulted from experimentation with various drugs, such as alcohol in the humorous Self portrait after three bottles of wine (1971).

== Archibald and other prizes ==
In the late 1970s, Brett Whiteley won the Archibald, Wynne and Sulman prizes several times. These are amongst the most prestigious art prizes in Australia. The competitions are run annually, with the award ceremonies being held at the Art Gallery of New South Wales.

Whiteley's awards were:

- 1976
  - Archibald Prize: Self portrait in the studio
  - Sulman Prize: Interior with time past
- 1977
  - Wynne Prize: The Jacaranda tree (On Sydney Harbour)
- 1978
  - Archibald Prize: Art, Life and the other thing
  - Sulman Prize: Yellow nude
  - Wynne Prize: Summer at Carcoar

1978 was the only year in which all three prizes have been won simultaneously by the same person.

His first Archibald award, Self portrait in the studio, in deep bluish tones, shows an image of his studio at Lavender Bay overlooking Sydney Harbour, with his own reflection in a mirror shown at the bottom of the picture; a view of Sydney Harbour on the left establishes the location of the picture. Typically, the viewer is led deeper into the picture by means of minute detail. As with other works, there is evidence of Whiteley's love for Matisse, ultramarine blue, the Sydney Harbour location and for collected objects.

His second Archibald prize, Art, Life and the other thing, shows his willingness to experiment with different media such as photography and collage. His reference to art history, including an image of the famous 1943 William Dobell portrait of Joshua Smith, won a court case against accusations that it was a caricature, not a portrait. The work experimented with warping and manipulating a straight self-portrait, incorporating his pictorial sense of addiction.

He won the Wynne Prize again, in 1984, with The South Coast after rain.

== TV documentary ==
He was the subject of an ABC television documentary called Difficult Pleasure directed by Don Featherstone in 1989, which showed him talking about many of his main works, and his recent works such as ones done during a month-long trip to Paris; one of his last overseas trips. He also showed his large T-shirt collection, and talks about his sculpture, which he said is an aspect of his work that many people do not take seriously. Difficult pleasure is how he described painting, or creating art stating, "Painting is an argument between what it looks like and what it means."

== Final years ==
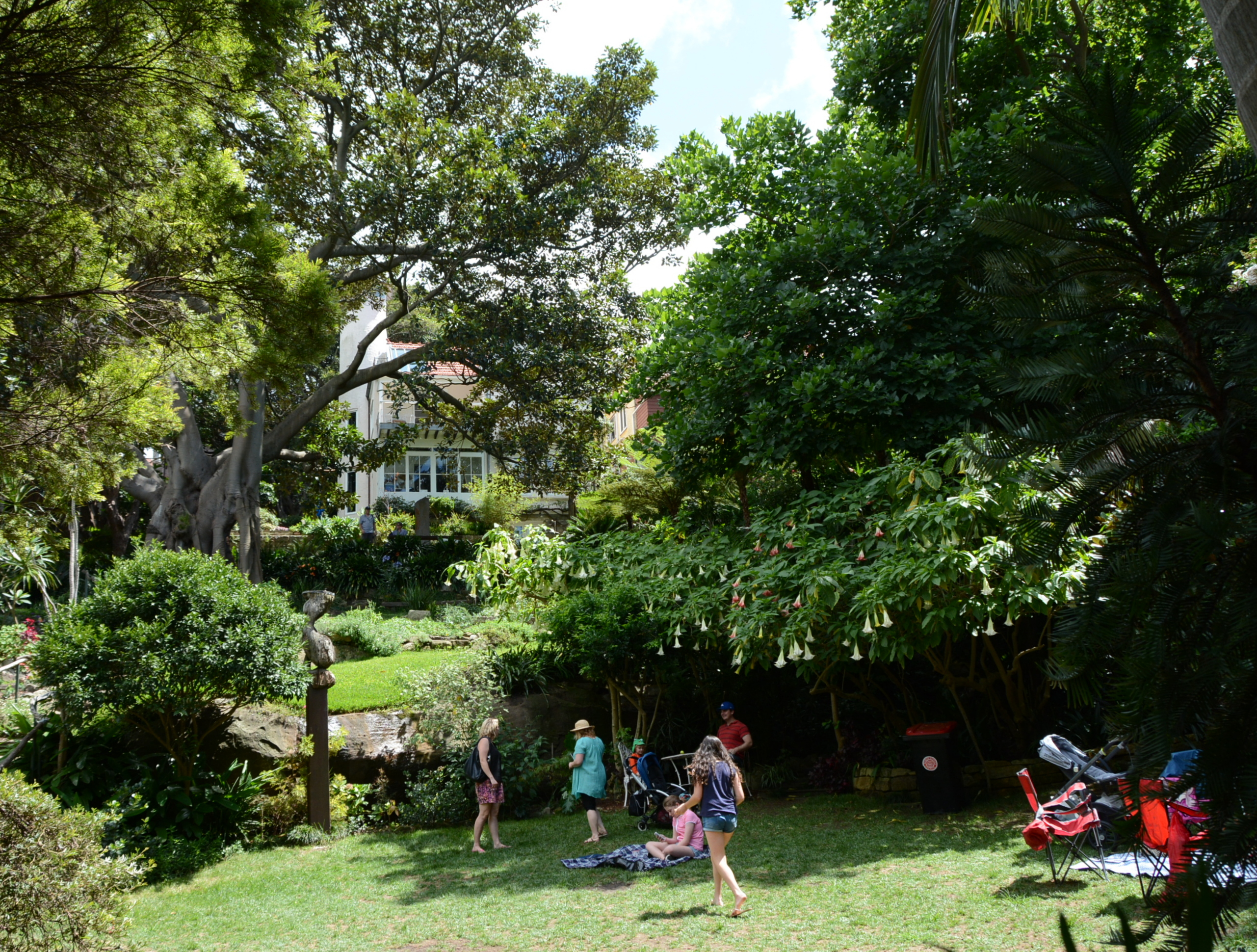
Wendy Whiteley's garden in Sydney, where Brett's ashes were scattered

Whiteley became increasingly dependent on alcohol and also became addicted to heroin. His work was not always being praised by critics, although its market value continued to climb. He made several attempts to dry out and get off drugs completely, all ultimately unsuccessful. In 1989, he and Wendy, whom he had always credited as his 'muse', divorced. He began a relationship with Janice Spencer, with whom he travelled to Japan, among other countries. He also spent time with friends including Mark Knopfler and John Illsley from the band Dire Straits.

In June 1991, Whiteley was appointed an Officer of the Order of Australia.

On 15 June 1992, aged 53, he was found dead from opiate overdose in a motel room in Thirroul, north of Wollongong. The coroner's verdict was 'death due to self-administered substances'.

In 1999, Whiteley's painting The Jacaranda tree (1977), which had won the Wynne Prize, sold for A$1,982,000, a record for a modern Australian painter at that time. Before this, his previous highest-selling work was The pond at Bundanon for A$649,500. In 2007 his painting The Olgas for Ernest Giles was sold by Menzies for an Australian record of A$3.5 million. On 7 May 2007, Opera House, (which took Whiteley a decade to paint, and which he exchanged with Qantas for a period of free air travel) sold for A$2.8 million, in Sydney.

== Legacy ==
Whiteley's home and workplace during the last four years of his life at 2 Raper Street in Surry Hills was converted into the Brett Whiteley Studio museum by the Art Gallery of New South Wales.

In 1999, Brett's mother Beryl Whiteley (1917–2010) founded the Brett Whiteley Travelling Art Scholarship in memory of her son.

Whiteley's work has been influential on a number of contemporary Australian artists', including, Josh Foley (artist), Ben Quilty and Joan Ross.

== Books ==
In July 2016, Text Publishing published Whiteley's biography, titled Brett Whiteley: Art, Life and the Other Thing, the definitive account of his life and work. The author, Ashleigh Wilson, was the arts editor of The Australian newspaper. It was written with unprecedented behind-the-scenes access, and illustrated with classic Brett Whiteley artworks, rare notebook sketches and candid family photographs. The book was longlisted for a Walkley Book Award and Australian Book Industry Award, and shortlisted for the Australian Book Design Awards and the Mark and Evette Moran Nib Literary Award. An audio version released by Audible in 2016 was narrated by Mark Seymour. The paperback, featuring a new cover, was released in 2017. On 23 November 2017 the book was named the people's choice winner at the Mark and Evette Moran NIB Literary Award.

Critical responses included The Sydney Morning Herald, which called it a 'sustained authorial discipline,' while Sasha Grishin in Sydney Review of Books said it was 'an essential and invaluable resource for any Whiteley scholar and presents a well-documented linear chronology of the artist's life from the cradle to the grave ... Ashleigh Wilson's Brett Whiteley: Art, Life and the Other Thing is a benchmark publication in Whiteley studies. Many earlier factual errors have been quietly corrected and much new material has been introduced into the public domain for the first time. Building on this valuable study it is timely for us to move our focus away from the man and firmly onto his art.' Barry Pearce, Emeritus Curator of Australian Art at the Art Gallery of NSW, also praised its achievement: 'With relentless precision, Ashleigh Wilson has provided a peerless grasp of the life and genius of Brett Whiteley. This storied journey of one of Australia’s most mercurial twentieth-century artists will be impossible for the reader to put aside until it is finished. It is the dispassionate biography Whiteley has long needed: a career clarified from the brilliant clouds of myth.' Mark Knopfler, the lead singer of Dire Straits and a friend of Whiteley's, said: 'Ashleigh Wilson has produced an intriguing, absorbing and assured account of Brett Whiteley’s life and work.'

Sandra McGrath's 1979 book Brett Whiteley, was the first major text on the artist. Other notable Whiteley books were later written by Barry Pearce, Margot Hilton and Graeme Blundell, Gabriella Coslovich and Lou Klepac.

In 2020, Black Inc published Brett Whiteley: Catalogue Raisonné: 1955–1992 a monumental, seven-volume collection that chronicles a lifetime of work in exhaustive detail. Compiled by art historian Kathie Sutherland over seven years, the set of cloth-bound books presented more than 4600 artworks, including hundreds of never-before-published works.

== Opera ==
In August 2018, Opera Australia announced that it had commissioned an opera to be based on the life of Brett Whiteley. The music was written by Elena Kats-Chernin, with a libretto by Justin Fleming. David Freeman directed and Tahu Matheson conducted. Ashleigh Wilson, author of Whiteley's biography, was a consultant on the work. It premiered at the Sydney Opera House on 15 July 2019.

== Film ==
In 2017, a feature-length biographical documentary about Whiteley was released in Australian cinemas. Directed by James Bogle and produced by Sue Clothier, Whiteley includes extensive archival footage and photos, personal notes and letters, as well as animations and dramatic reconstructions, although no new interviews were shot for the film. This approach was intended to allow Whiteley to speak "in his own words" about his life and art. The documentary was made with the approval of Wendy Whiteley, and was received with critical acclaim.

== Notes ==
=== References ===
- Wilson, Ashleigh (2016). Brett Whiteley: Art, Life and the Other Thing. Text Publishing. ISBN 9781922253811.

Awards and achievements
Preceded by Kevin Connor	Archibald Prize; 1976 for Self Portrait in the Studio	Succeeded by Kevin Connor
Preceded by Kevin Connor	Archibald Prize; 1978 for Art, Life and the other thing	Succeeded by Wes Walters
