= Scott Bevan (journalist) =

Australian journalist

- Born: 1964 (age 61–62); Newcastle, New South Wales, Australia
- Years active: 36
- Notable credit(s): Moscow Correspondent ABC TV (2008–2010); News presenter ABC News 24 (2010–2015)
- Spouse: Jane

Scott Bevan (born 1964 in Newcastle, New South Wales) is an Australian TV and radio presenter, journalist and biographer.

== Biography ==
Scott Bevan grew up near Merewether in Newcastle. In 1984 he joined the Newcastle Herald as a cadet journalist. He later worked in commercial radio as a news presenter. After a fifteen-month stint in Japan he joined the Nine Network in 1989 as a reporter. He spent time in Perth working for Nine News.

Bevan moved to the Australian Broadcasting Corporation in 2005, working initially as reporter for the 7.30 Report and a presenter on ABC Local Radio. In 2008 he was posted to Moscow as a correspondent for ABC Television.

In 2010, he returned to Australia to become a presenter on ABC News 24.

In 2014, Bevan's biography of Australian artist Sir William Dobell, Bill: The Life of William Dobell, was published.

In January 2016, Bevan resigned from the ABC to restart a music career.
