= Joshua Smith (artist) =

Australian painter

- Mr Joshua Smith, 1943 by William Dobell
- Born: 12 March 1905
- Died: 6 March 1995 (aged 89); Sydney, South Wales, Australia
- Known for: Painting

Joshua Smith (12 March 1905 – 22 July 1995) was an Australian artist who won the Archibald Prize in 1944 with his portrait of Hon Sol Rosevear, MP, Speaker of the Australian House of Representatives, but is better known as the subject of the previous year's controversial Archibald Prize win, Mr Joshua Smith by artist William Dobell.

Although the portrait of him was very popular, with more than 154,000 visitors, a court case relating to the portrait in 1943 damaged his career, as well as Dobell's. Garfield Barwick appeared for the plaintiff and, although the claim was dismissed, it made Barwick's reputation as a rising star of the legal fraternity. In an interview in 1991 Smith called the portrait a "curse, a phantom that haunts me. It has torn at me every day of my life. I've tried to bury it inside me in the hope it would die, but it never does". The portrait of him by Dobell had become more famous than his own work, which caused him considerable consternation.

Awards
Preceded by William Dobell	Archibald Prize; 1944 for portrait of Hon Sol Rosevear	Succeeded by William Dargie
