= William Dobell =

Australian artist (1899–1970)

Sir William Dobell OBE
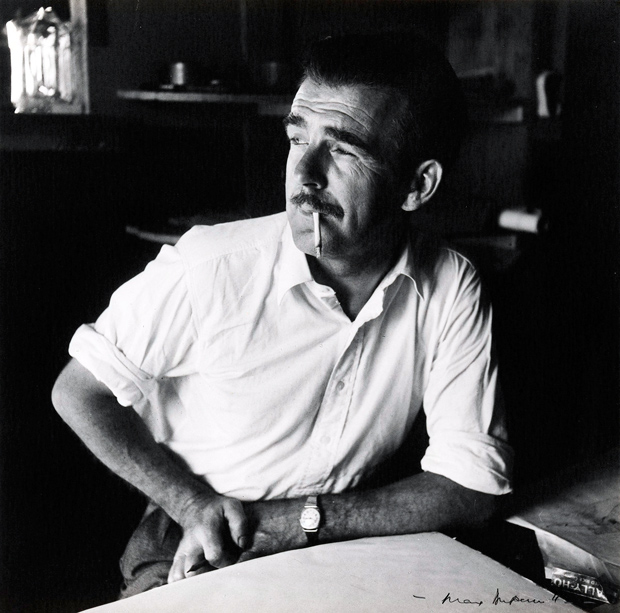
- William Dobell, 1942, photograph by Max Dupain
- Born: 24 September 1899; Cooks Hill, Colony of New South Wales
- Died: 13 May 1970 (aged 70); Wangi Wangi, New South Wales, Australia
- Education: Cooks Hill Public School; Slade School of Fine Art
- Known for: Artist
- Style: Portrait and Landscape painting
- Awards: Archibald Prize: 1943, 1948, 1959; Wynne Prize: 1948

Sir William Dobell (24 September 1899 – 13 May 1970) was an Australian portrait and landscape artist of the 20th century. Dobell won the Archibald Prize, Australia's premier award for portrait artists, on three occasions. The Dobell Prize is named in his honour.

== Career ==
Dobell was born in Cooks Hill, a working-class neighbourhood of Newcastle, New South Wales in Australia to Robert Way Dobell and Margaret Emma (née Wrightson). His father was a builder and there were six children.

Dobell's artistic talents were evident early. In 1916, he was apprenticed to Newcastle architect, Wallace L. Porter and in 1924 he moved to Sydney as a draftsman. In 1925, he enrolled in evening art classes at the Sydney Art School (which later became the Julian Ashton Art School), with Henry Gibbons as his teacher. He was influenced by George Washington Lambert. He was also gay and consequently never married, while several of his works carried strong homoerotic overtones.

In 1929, Dobell was awarded the Society of Artists' Travelling Scholarship and travelled to England to the Slade School of Fine Art where he studied under Philip Wilson Steer and Henry Tonks. In 1930, he won first prize for figure painting at Slade and also travelled to Poland. In 1931 he moved on to Belgium and Paris, and after 10 years in Europe returned to Australia – taking with him a new Expressionist style of painting as opposed to his earlier naturalistic approach.

In 1939, he began as a part-time teacher at East Sydney Technical College. After the outbreak of war, he was drafted into the Civil Construction Corps of the Allied Works Council in 1941 as a camouflage painter; he later became an unofficial war artist. During his two years as a camouflage painter, he shared a tent with artist Joshua Smith.

In 1944, he had his first solo exhibition including public collection loans at the inauguration of the David Jones Art Gallery, Sydney.

In 1949, he visited New Guinea as a guest of Sir Edward Hallstrom with writers Frank Clune and Colin Simpson. The trip inspired a new series of tiny, brilliantly coloured landscapes. In 1950, he revisited New Guinea; on his return to Australia he continued to paint scenes of New Guinea, as well as portraits.

Dobell was interviewed in 1959 by Hazel de Berg about his time painting Dame Mary Gilmore's portrait. The recording can be found at the National Library of Australia.

Australian painter William Dobell, New South Wales, c. 1950

Between 1960 and 1963 TIME magazine commissioned Dobell to paint four portraits for covers, one per year, of: Sir Robert Menzies, Prime Minister of Australia; South Vietnam's President Ngô Đình Diệm; Frederick G. Donner, the Chairman of General Motors; and Tunku Abdul Rahman, Prime Minister of Malaysia.

In 1964, Dobell exhibited in a major retrospective at the Art Gallery of New South Wales and the first monograph of his work was written by James Gleeson.

=== The Archibald Prize controversy ===
In 1943, Dobell's portrait of Joshua Smith, titled "Portrait of an artist", was awarded the Archibald Prize. This was contested in 1944 by two unsuccessful entrants (Mary Edwell-Burke and Joseph Wolinski), who brought a lawsuit against Dobell and the Gallery's Board of Trustees in the Supreme Court of New South Wales on the grounds that the painting was a caricature and therefore not eligible for the prize. Public opinion was sharply divided, with most viewers puzzled by the unexpected portrait.

One art critic was highly laudatory:

Creating a man in the simplicity of everyday existence, Dobell reaches profundity by his understanding of this life which, at this instant, is realised and merged with his own nature.

During his courtroom defense of the piece Dobell stated:

"Art fails to be Art if you fail to select for your design. All artists must do that and I did it."

The claim was dismissed and the award was upheld, but the ordeal left Dobell emotionally disturbed and he retreated in 1945 to his sister's home at Wangi Wangi on Lake Macquarie, where he began to paint landscapes. The Supreme Court opinion by Mr Justice Roper said:

The picture in question is characterized by some startling exaggeration and distortion, clearly intended by the artist, his technique being too brilliant to admit of any other conclusion. It bears, nevertheless, a strong degree of likeness to the subject and is, I think, undoubtedly a pictorial representation of him. I find it a fact that it is a portrait within the meaning of the words in the will, and consequently the trustees did not err in admitting it to the competition.

== Death and legacy ==
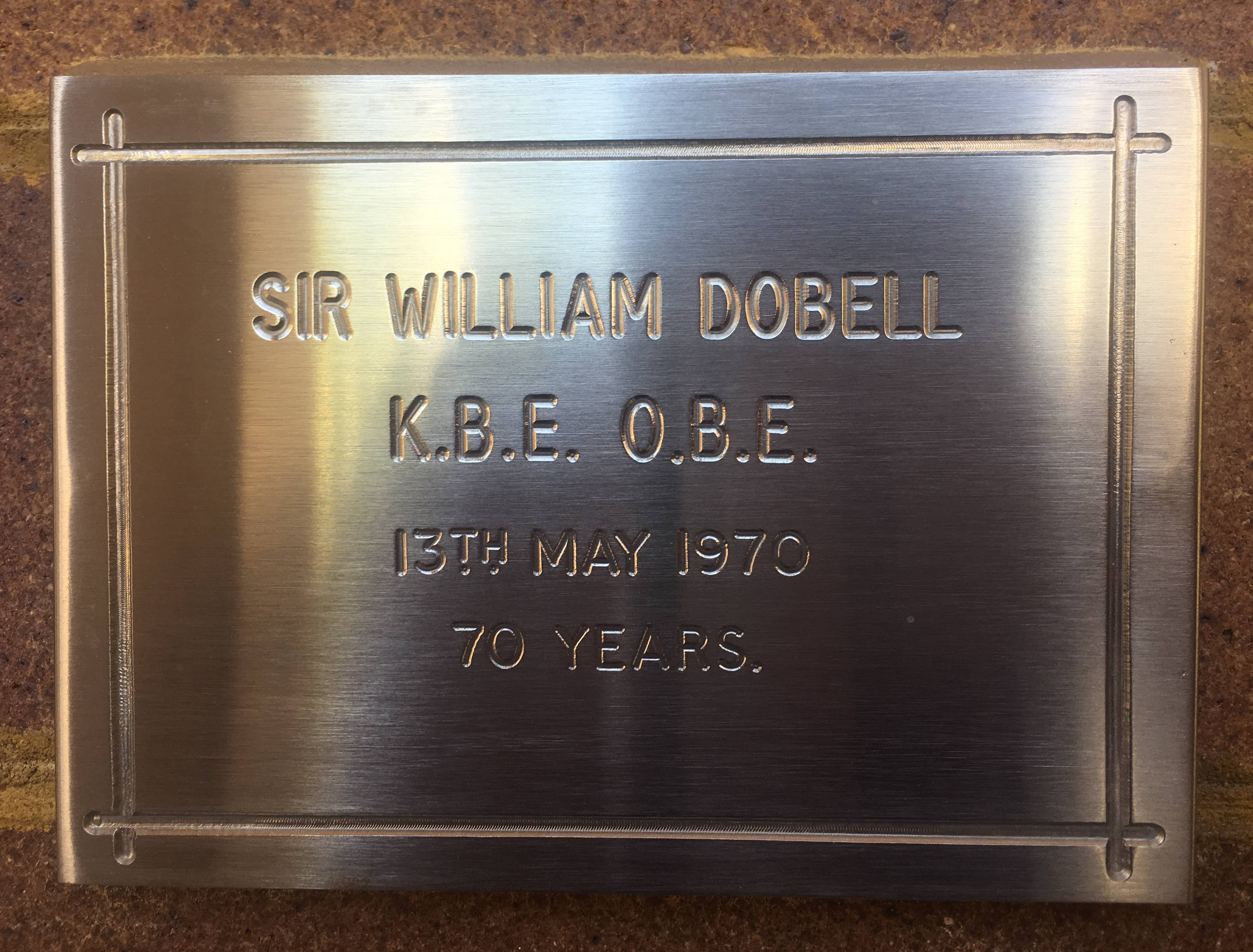
Plaque at Dobell's grave at Newcastle Memorial Park in Beresfield

Dobell was a very private man, known almost always as "Bill". He died on 13 May 1970 at his home in the Lake Macquarie suburb of Wangi Wangi of hypertensive heart disease. He was cremated with Anglican rites and his ashes interred at Newcastle Memorial Park in Beresfield, New South Wales where his plaque incorrectly states his knighthood is a KBE whereas he was awarded a OBE in 1965 and his knighthood derives from being invested as a Knight Bachelor in 1966.

The sole beneficiary of his estate was the Sir William Dobell Art Foundation, which was founded on 19 January 1971 and awards the Dobell Australian Drawing Biennial, which is named in his honour.

A film of Dobell's life, titled Yours sincerely, Bill Dobell was made in 1981 by Brian Adams and Cathy Shirley for the Australian Broadcasting Commission and the William Dobell Art Foundation. Brian Adams' book Portrait of an Artist – A biography of William Dobell was first published in 1983 by Hutchinson Publishing Group and revised in paperback in 1992 for Random House Australia.

A book on the life and art of William Dobell, William Dobell: An Artist's Life by Elizabeth Donaldson, was compiled in 2010 with the support of the Sir William Dobell Art Foundation and Dobell House, in Wangi Wangi. It is published by Exisle Publishing.

A biography, Bill: The Life of William Dobell, was published in 2014 by Scott Bevan.

In November 2023 it was announced that Dobell was one of 14 people, places and events commemorated in the second round of blue plaques sponsored by the Government of New South Wales alongside Kathleen Butler, godmother of Sydney Harbour Bridge; Emma Jane Callaghan, an Aboriginal midwife and activist; Susan Katherina Schardt; journalist Dorothy Drain; writer Charmian Clift; Beryl Mary McLaughlin, one of the first three women to graduate in architecture from the University of Sydney; Grace Emily Munro, Syms Covington; Ioannis (Jack) and Antonios (Tony) Notaras; Ken Thomas of Thomas Nationwide Transport, Bondi Surf Bathers' Life Saving Club and the first release of myxomatosis.

=== Awards ===
- In 1943, Archibald Prize for Mr Joshua Smith, a portrait of the artist Joshua Smith (unsuccessfully challenged in court as being caricature rather than portraiture)
- In 1948, Archibald Prize for a portrait of Margaret Olley
- In 1948, the Wynne Prize for Storm Approaching Wangi
- In 1959, Archibald Prize for a portrait of Dr E. G. MacMahon

=== Honours ===
- Officer of the Order of the British Empire (OBE) 1 January 1965, "In recognition of service to the arts as a portrait and landscape painter"
- Knight Bachelor 3 June 1966, "In recognition of service to the arts"
- The federal electoral Division of Dobell in New South Wales is named after Dobell

=== Gallery room ===
- The Pro Hart Art Gallery in Broken Hill has a dedicated 'Sir William Dobell Room' that displays more than 300 of Dobell's drawings

=== Books ===
The book William Dobell: An Artist's Life by Elizabeth Donaldson published in 2010 includes many of Dobell's works, as well as archival photographs.

A biography of Dobell, Bill: The Life of William Dobell, by Scott Bevan was published in 2014.

== See also ==
- Visual arts of Australia

Awards
Preceded by William Dargie	Archibald Prize; 1943 for Mr Joshua Smith	Succeeded by Joshua Smith
Preceded by William Dargie	Archibald Prize; 1948 for Margaret Olley	Succeeded by Arthur Murch
Preceded by William Edwin Pidgeon	Archibald Prize; 1959 for Dr. Edward MacMahon	Succeeded by Judy Cassab
