= Alannah Coleman =

Australian painter, gallery director and art dealer (1918–1998)

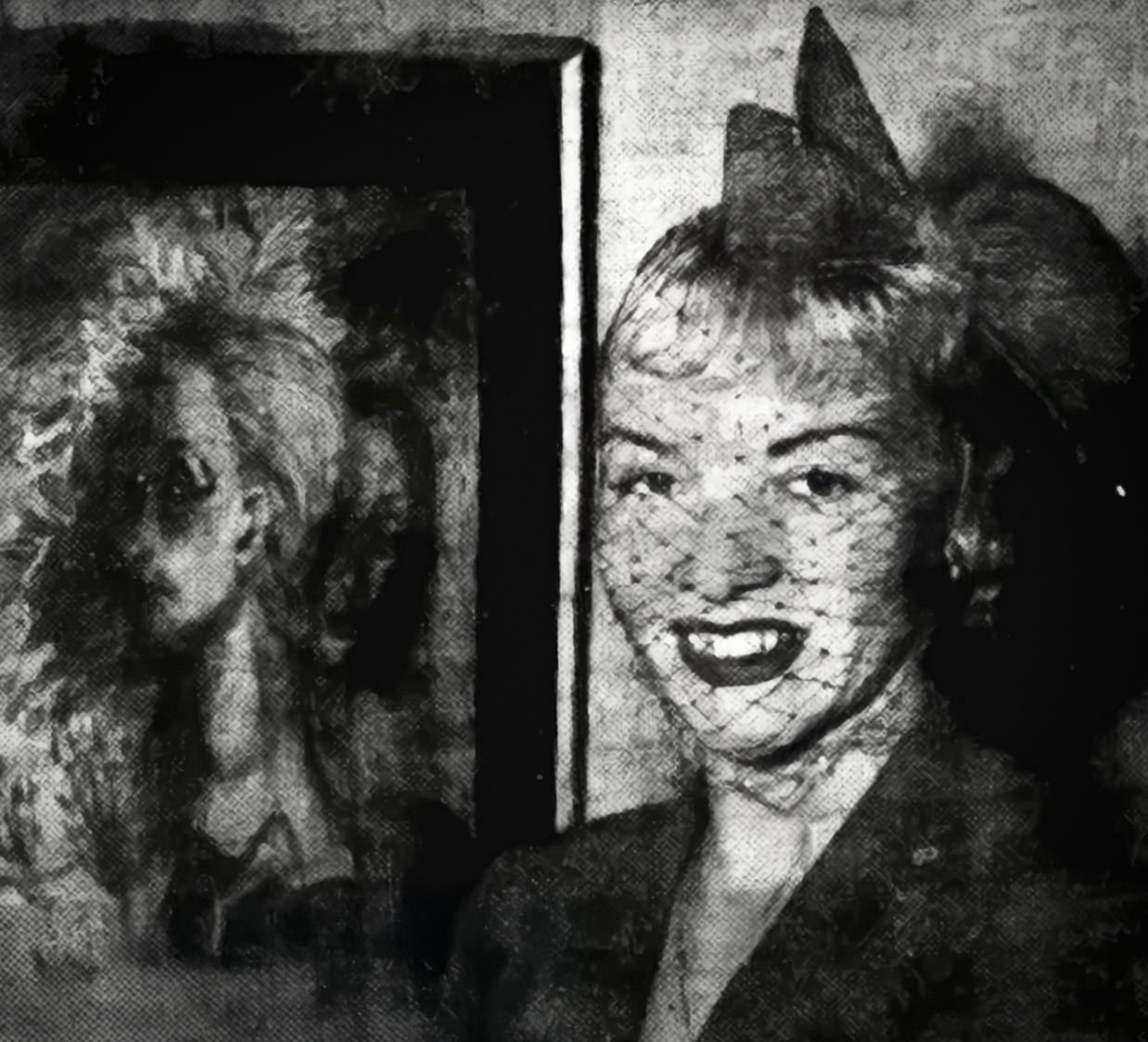
- Alannah Coleman at the Society of Artists exhibition, David Jones gallery, Sydney, May 1949 (picture: Daily Mirror)
- Born: November 3, 1918; Melbourne, Australia
- Died: London, England
- Education: National Gallery of Victoria schools
- Spouses: Desmond Fennessy (m. 1943; div. 1949); Denis Sharman (m. 1951; div. 1957); John Newell (m. 1963; div. 1968)
- Children: twins Alister and Simone
- Parents: Ernest Coleman (father); Irene Monica Duffy (mother)
- Elected: International Association of Art Critics

Alannah Coleman (3 November 1918 – 12 September 1998) was an Australian painter, gallery director and dealer in Australian art who drew valuable attention to the work of expatriates to England in the 1950s–1990s and increased awareness of Australian art and artists in Europe.

== Early life ==
Alannah Coleman, christened Eileen, and who was called Lana by her family, was born in 1918 in Melbourne. Her parents Irene ('Renee') Monica (née Duffy) and Ernest Coleman separated when she was seven. She then lived in a spartan rear flat at 31 Marine Parade, St Kilda with her politically active mother and Irish grandparents, from whose Irish Catholicism she developed a strong sense of identity. She attended the St Kilda Primary School, went briefly to a convent school and then to the Emily McPherson College where she met Elizabeth Paterson, daughter of artist Hugh Paterson and niece of John Ford Paterson, and who was to become Sidney Nolan's future first wife.

== National Gallery schools ==
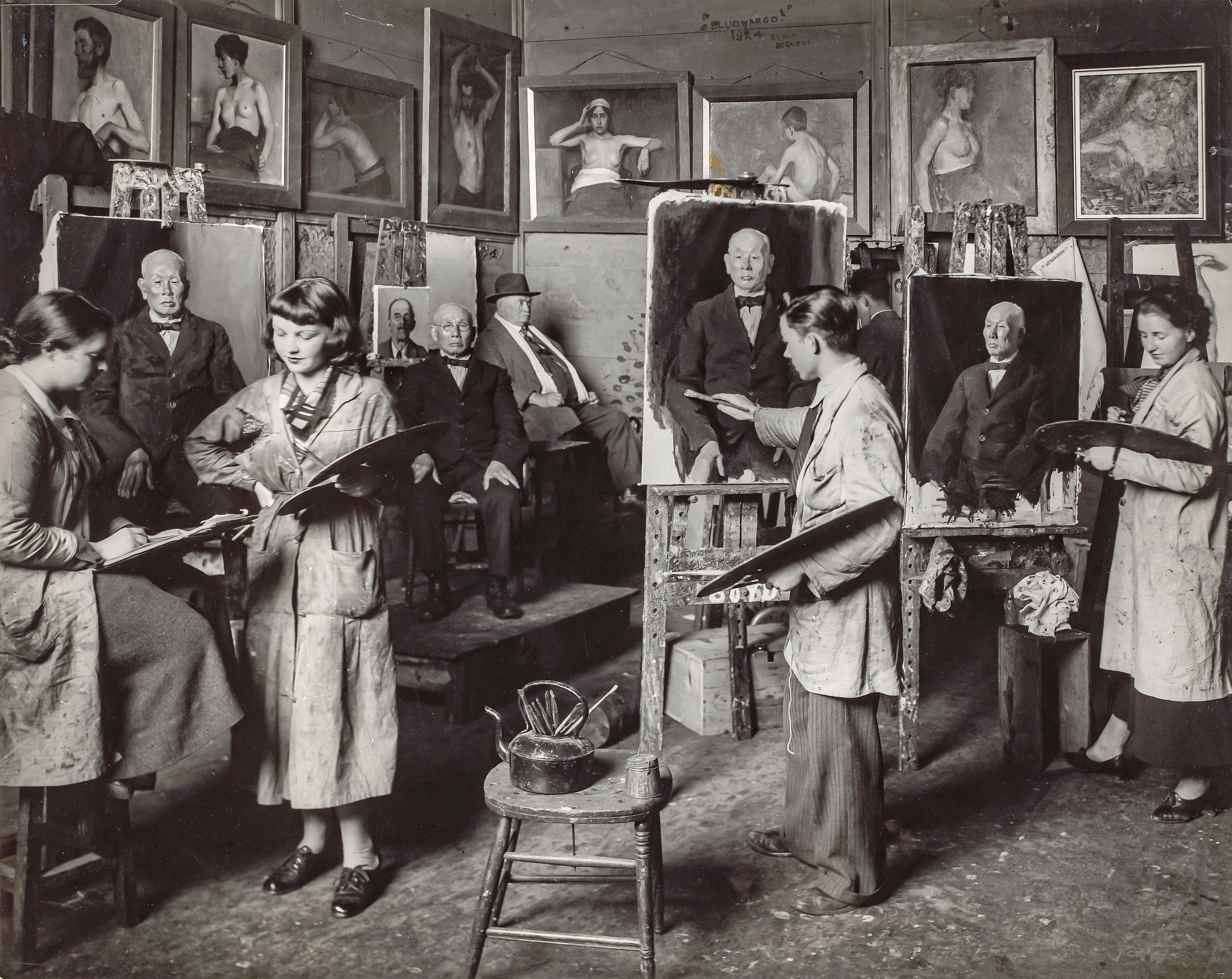
Melbourne National Gallery School life class in 1935 (L-R) Phyl Waterhouse, Alannah Coleman, Charles Bush, Jean McInnes and Miss Eastwood (most not standing in front of their own canvases). Lining the walls, works by Hugh Ramsay, John Longstaff, Max Meldrum, James Quinn, Isaac Cohen and Charles Wheeler. Taken for Table Talk magazine

Coleman's mother encouraged her interest in art, and from the age of fourteen Coleman studied at the National Gallery of Victoria schools in Melbourne from 1933 to 1939, under William B. McInnes and Charles Wheeler. Her attractiveness, social talents and calm demeanour noted by her associates were an asset when she served as honorary treasurer of the National Gallery art students’ annual ball at the Palais de Danse, St Kilda on 17 September 1936, with a ‘ballet of cave men and modern maidens' (Alannah Coleman and Elizabeth Paterson) against scenery painted by the student artists. The following year, at the St Kilda Town Hall, Coleman and Paterson's theme for the ball was Mexican, for which ‘huge mural decorations of futuristic Mexican figures painted on immense sheets of brown paper lined the walls.’

Elizabeth Paterson and Sidney Nolan’ were amongst several of Alannah's student colleagues to whom she remained close. On 16 December 1938, she performed as witness to their brief marriage and was godmother to their daughter. Other fellow students were Joan James (née Currie), Joan Malcolm, Joy Hester, Albert Tucker, Howard Matthews, Yvonne Lennie (future wife of Arthur Boyd), Phyl Waterhouse and Charles Bush, with all of whom she continued friendships. An archive of approximately 319 Aerogramme letters and 21 postcards that Alannah wrote weekly to Bush over 1971–1989 is held in the State Library of Victoria. She was among the founders of the Contemporary Art Society when attending its first meeting with Hester, and Coleman exhibited frequently with the organisation. Coleman was the model for William Dargie’s work shown in a July 1939 exhibition with paintings by P. G. Moore and Kathleen Howitt (Mrs Dargie), at the Athenaeum gallery.

== War years ==
With the outbreak of WW2, in 1940 Coleman figured frequently in the social pages where she was noted for her fashion sense. Her contemporary, poet and broadcaster Alister Kershaw, whose portrait she painted was runner-up in the 1944 Archibald Prize, remembered:

Back in the Thirties and early Forties there were about fifty square yards at the top of Melbourne's Little Collins Street where [...] the sight of a beard didn't provoke a display of popular indignation. You could even get away with sandals. The bewitching young artist Alannah Coleman could get away with more than that. Her costume was, as a rule, richly international. Once when we were having dinner together, she arrived wearing velvet trousers and a Breton fisherman's striped shirt. A cape like those worn by officers of the Bersaglieri hung to her ankles. An Egyptian fez was perched becomingly on her long blonde hair. A quiver of arrows slung over her shoulders added a Robin Hood or Saxon touch. If she had anything on her feet at all, it can only have been a pair of Roman sandals. Anywhere else in the city, she might have been run in on a charge of disturbing the peace; here, she received no more attention than was due to an exceptionally attractive young woman.

She contributed to the RAN Relief Fund performance at the National Theatre, Melbourne, and joined the official party accompanying commander of the Free French Forces in the Pacific, Commandant Jardin, for the gala first recital of Arise, O France, also at the National Theatre, in 1941.

Splits in the Contemporary Arts Society state branches over the control of it by the Angry Penguins versus the communist adherents started to appear publicly in 1943 but as Haese notes, in the Victorian council John Sinclair, Nolan, Perceval, Harris, Boyd, Allan Henderson and Alannah Coleman (the only woman on the committee), democratic principles prevailed; 'the Angry Penguins controlled rather than dominated the Melbourne branch because until 1945 the communist members maintained constant pressure on their leadership.' Coleman was close to Rupert Bunny when in 1936 he became the Vice-President of the Contemporary Art Society, and they remained friends until his death in 1947.

In 1943, Coleman married a Catholic, the Australian journalist and magazine editor, Des Fennessy who later became Australian Trade Commissioner in Seoul. The marriage was annulled in 1949.

== Artist ==
Coleman's most productive period as a painter of portraits, still-life, and landscapes, was through the war years from 1943, and until 1949. George Bell, reviewing her April 1944, widely publicised, joint show with Joan Malcolm, wrote favourably of their 'dynamic style' and of Coleman's 'great variety of manners of seeing and treating her subject.' He considered that 'a certain weakness In construction will no doubt be overcome in time', as the 'landscapes have all been treated with a worthy determination to avoid banality'. Bell listed as 'outstanding' portraits by Coleman, James Quinn, Lawson and Matthews, and landscapes by A. Keynes, G, Anderson, Isabel Tweddle in the Victorian Artists' Society Spring show of 1944. She spent a month in Sydney in November that year, working on an upcoming show, and was at Desiderious Orban's opening at Blaxland Gallery along with Douglas Watson and Charles Bush, who were then both AIF war artists. Coleman participated in November 1944 in an exhibition at the South Australian Gallery with a portrait noted as 'excellent' by reviewer Esmond George.

At a group show at the Blue Door Gallery, Melbourne, in November 1945, Colman's still life of shasta daisies was considered by The Herald reviewer a 'choice arrangement of appealing color-tones' from 'a young painter whose progress is definite and continuous', while critic Alan McCulloch considered the Daisies 'worthy of comment' amongst the 'younger artists', after having remarked that she continued 'to make progress' in a review of a Victorian Artists Society show in September that year. During the war years Coleman worked in the Navy Department, and George Bell noted a 'quiet reserve' in a portrait of a naval officer which was her contribution to the Victorian Artists' Society Autumn show of 1946.

Coleman's first solo exhibition, in November 1946, drew a cold response from The Argus reviewer (not likely McCulloch, who had been fired for his support of Tucker, so more probably, Arnold Shore):

Alannah Coleman's paintings at the Myer Gallery are more likely to appeal to disciples of modern cults than to the general body of art lovers. Whether they be portraits or pictures of Sydney suburbs or slum areas, there is little beauty in the work. They might be called fashionable just now, but if art is long fashions are not.

Elizabeth Webb, a radio personality who expressed negative views on modernism as 'malformation', noted that Coleman's 'portraits of Alister Kershaw, Dudley Barr, and of herself, were entries for the Archibald Prize and [that] all three reached the finals', and was well-disposed of evidence of Coleman's academic training in her critique of her solo show of June 1947 in Brisbane; 'Miss Coleman is not (yet) an extreme 'extremist.' She is not influenced by the 'modern' trend so completely as to ignore the basic principles of 'good drawing' in all her work.'

By contrast, Charles G. Cooper, Classics Professor at the University of Queensland, in his Courier-Mail review of the 1949 joint exhibition of paintings by Alannah Coleman and Arthur Evan Read at Moreton Galleries, Queensland, is dismissive of Read's lack of subtlety, but writes glowingly of Coleman as 'distinctly an original', praising the 'freshness, vigour and decorative excellence' of her work, and urging audiences to 'relish her piquant blend of ingenuousness and sophistication.' Artist James Wieneke of the Brisbane Telegraph is more sympathetic to Read's depictions of the slums of Sydney, and contrasts those with the 'sensitiveness and a strong feeling of romanticism' in Coleman's work, responding most favourably to the sense of humour in her Siamese Cat which has 'a quality one could definitely describe as feline. This is conveyed through detail such as the cold blue and those long, slender, moving leaves in the background—eloquent of a chilly restlessness.'

== Post-war ==
After the War, in 1946 Coleman managed the Contemporary Art Society exhibition in Sydney and moved into a studio flat in a three-storey house at 151 Dowling Street, Woolloomooloo, among other artists including Rod Edwards, and Oliffe Richmond in the downstairs studio. Nolan retreated there in 1948 after his estrangement from the Reeds at Heidi and before joining Cynthia Reed. At Darling Street, Coleman met Frank Mitchell and Robert Henry for whom she modelled their first fashion collection in 1949. Coleman also researched the 1865 period at the Mitchell Library for her costume designs for the film Robbery Under Arms. She held her first solo show, works made in Sydney, at the Myer Art Gallery in Melbourne in November 1946, the event unfortunately coinciding with the death of Alannah's mother Irene. Over December 1949 she worked on an entry for the Archibald Prize.

Stalking and an attempt on her life in June 1950 by a jealous lover precipitated her departure for Europe on the SS Ranchi. Having been welcomed to London by Charles Bush and sharing quarters in Earl's Court with Bush, his partner Phyllis Waterhouse, Joan Currie, Joan Malcolm, Douglas Watson and Peter Blayney, she set out on an adventurous, low-budget return visit with Sheila Boyle (whom she'd met on the Ranchi, for a European tour that included Lapland, Germany and France, where she and Albert Tucker had chance encounter. They hitched a lift with Sydney-born English dental surgeon Denis Sharman whom Coleman soon quietly married in 1951, but not before (it was rumoured) she had been obliged to find employment as usherette in the Royal Box at Mills Brothers Circus, and in a Bond Street jewellery store J. W. Bensons. The couple had twins Alister and Simone in 1953, and on the babies' first birthday the family moved from their central London apartment in Birdcage Walk overlooking St James's Park, and which Coleman had creatively decorated herself, into 'Cherry Tree Cottage' in Langford Close, St John's Wood, next door to Mark Hambourg. Alannah and Denis separated in 1957.

== London ==
Coleman, after her relocation to London and second divorce, launched a new career. She established in 1959 an art dealership from her apartment, the Alannah Coleman Gallery in Putney, where she promoted such expatriate Australian artists as Arthur Boyd, Tony Underhill, Oliffe Richmond, Tony Underhill and Louis James by inviting clients to see the work in the domestic setting. Sidney Nolan and Cynthia lived nearby and she continued to sell his work. Barbara Blackman remembered her as catlike (and she was, with Sunday Reed, a cat lover): ‘She slinks about in Royal circles, she is smelling out the buyer, she will purr up to him and whisper the right names’. She was conscientious; holding long parties to introduce artists to buyers; attending several previews in the evenings; advising clients in their own homes on the appropriate hanging of their purchases.

Coleman was active in establishing the Australian Artists' Association (AAA) in London, to foster connections between expatriate Australian artists and the British art world. Contemporary Australian painting achieved international status due to a number of significant exhibitions that took place in Britain between 1953 and 1964. With interest increasing, on 2 June 1961, Recent Australian Painting had been launched at the Whitechapel Gallery. Then, following the Tate Gallery's 24 January–3 March 1963 exhibition Australian Painting: Colonial, Impressionist, Contemporary – the largest such survey in the UK since 1923, but criticised for its merely token inclusion of younger artists' work—Coleman had organised another; Australian Painting and Sculpture in Europe Today at New Metropole Arts Centre in Folkestone, Kent which Sir Kenneth Clark opened on 19 April 1963, lauding it as 'the most impressive group show of Australian art ever in Britain'.

Peter Sheldon-Williams (a.k.a. 'A. Oskar' whose exhibition Coleman reviewed in 1986) writing on how 'An Australian Row Comes To Britain' in The Contemporary Review of February 1963 positions Australian Painting and Sculpture in Europe Today as a representation of the Australian avant-garde, against the conservatism of Australian Painting: Colonial, Impressionist, Contemporary which imposed the reactionary aesthetic tastes of Robert Menzies, who had founded the ill-fated Australian Academy of Art (1937–1947), on an exhibition meant to showcase the progress of Australian art. Sheldon-Williams compares Menzies with Hitler and Khrushchev in regard to despotic fear of 'change, reform and new ideas' to conclude that 'the Austrahan Exhibition at the Tate is not giving us the whole picture, is not in fact a 'true cross-section of what modem Australian Art is achieving', before detailing Coleman's bona fides and her achievement in the Folkestone alternative:

[Coleman's] earliest fame came when she was a practising artist herself first a Melbourne and later in Sydney. Miss Coleman was a familiar figure in those days in the art colonies of both these centres. She was present at the first inaugural meeting of the Contemporary Art Society of Australia when Albert Tucker was president. She made herself responsible for organizing important early exhibitions of Australian Modern Art including the big show of Danila Vassilieff, the Russian modern artist who settled in Australia and became the centre of one "establishment" storm after another. Miss Coleman was a close friend of many of the young painters of those days, including Sidney Nolan and Albert Tucker. Her association with them and others gave her keen insight into what was going on in the Australian cultural front. Now, Miss Coleman is in London. She has established herself in a magnificent salon where she is surrounded by the works of modern Australian painters and sculptors. Her address in Putney is a cultural shopwindow for the Antipodes. Nearly all Australian artists who have been in Britain or who have settled in this country have examples of their œuvre there. The first fully-public display of Miss Coleman's "collection" is being shown in the galleries of the New Metropole Art Centre in Folkestone.

Coleman organised an extension of the show with work by Boyd, Nolan, Blackman, Len French, Brett Whiteley and William Delafield-Cook at the Stadel’sches Kunstinstitut, Frankfurt-am-Main, opening on 4 July 1963. She was appointed commissioner general to the Paris Biennale for Young Painters in 1963 and was hired as director at Heal's Gallery in Tottenham Court Road, London, where she showed both Australian and British artists.

Also in 1963 Coleman married her third husband, John Newell. The couple divorced in 1968, the marriage strained by the demands of her co-directing the Ewan Phillips gallery in Maddox Street, Mayfair and directing Heal's Gallery and her research into Australian artists, which intensified, requiring her attendance at openings and events and lectures, such as those at the Royal Society of Arts.

== Bonython Gallery ==
In early 1970, Albert Tucker, whom Coleman had represented, suggested to Kym Bonython that she should manage shows at his eponymous gallery in Sydney. When she arrived, Mollie Lyons reported in the Women's Weekly that the 'art world turned up in full force this week at the Bonython Gallery to welcome home Alannah Coleman after 19 years overseas'. The Bulletin interviewed her for its February issue and recorded how during her time in London, she had witnessed the growing international recognition and value of Australian art in the market. She said that Australian paintings, once absent from major auction houses like Christie's and Sotheby's, were now fetching significant prices, and there was increasing interest in Australian colonial art particularly among Australian collectors in the UK. Of the broader art market, Coleman commented on the high prices commanded by artists like Francis Bacon and the scarcity of works by Picasso and Jackson Pollock.

A portrait by Charles Bush of Coleman surrounded by framed works and folios of drawings was a finalist in the 1970 Archibald Prize, and Alannah's weekly letters to Bush date from 1971.

On assuming the position, she oversaw solo shows by Brett Whiteley (June–July 1970) and Ken Reinhard (July–August 1970) which had already been arranged, though she herself curated paintings by Victor Vasarely which she had obtained through contacts in Paris for a sell-out show, and staged a large survey of about 30 Australian modernists; Australian Irresistibles 1930–1970, over August–September 1970. Artist and reviewer Elwyn Lynn thought it 'a most commendable survey even in a city bereft of them', and discerned an Australian modulation, or even rejection, of French 'ease' in the way:

...Godfrey Miller romanticises Jacques Villon in a shadowed circle, Paul Haefliger’s Picassoid-Braque piece is invaded by German Expressionism; [Anthony] Underhill lacks French crispness; Passmore gives his Cezannesque landscape a lowering, romantic sky; Fullbrook softens his cubist shapes in a fleeting landscape with a romantic mist, and even Fairweather, in his fine Gamelan...inclines to a fugitive fuzziness that is foreign to its partly French origins.

The Bonython appointment lasted only a year, due to disagreements over the financial viability of the large gallery, which closed after its losses, in 1976, and the less formal openings and events that Coleman found contrary to European conventions.

== Return to England ==
Returning to the UK, Coleman stayed with friends then moved to Deal House, Stour Street, Canterbury on 1 October 1971. She next moved on 18 February 1978 to 6 Rodborough Road, Golders Green. She organised shows for the Qantas gallery and the New South Wales House gallery in London, continued to be recognised and consulted for her expertise on Australian artists who worked and showed in Britain, and wrote occasional articles on contemporary art and artists for various publications in London and Australia. She was made a member, by invitation, of the International Association of Art Critics.

Alannah Coleman died on 12 September 1998 at Marie Curie Hospice, in Lyndhurst Gardens, Belsize Park, and a high mass for her was held on 5 October at St. Mary's Catholic Church, Hampstead. Obituaries were published in The Independent, The Australian and The Age.

A biography, Alannah Coleman: A Life in Art by Dr Simon Pierse was released in 2022 and launched at Heidi Museum of Modern Art on 3 December 2022.

== Exhibitions ==
- 1944, from 4 April: paintings by Alannah Coleman and Joan Malcolm, opened by actor Claude Flemming at Tye's Velasquez Galleries 100 Bourke Street, Melbourne
- 1944, September: Victorian Artists' Society Spring Show
- 1945, 21–31 August Contemporary Art Society Exhibition with artists: Lawrence Adolphus, Gordon Andrews, Jean Bellette, Bill Cantwell, Edward Collings, Mary Curtis, Peter Dodd, O. Edwards, L. Elbourne, Cedric Flower, Yvonne Francort, Bernard Hesling, Avis Higgs, N. Ivangine, Margot Kater, Herbert Kemble, M. Kimlin, Amie Kingston, V. Kinsky, Alicia Lee, Ruth Levy, Margo Lewers, Raymond Lindsay, Herbert McClintock, Alick McKenzie, Eleanor Martin, Jesse Martin, Frank Medworth, Brian Midlane, Hal Missingham, Alistair Morrison, Justin O'Brien, Desiderius Orban, Ruth Pasco, M. D. Paxton, Carl Plate, Freda Robertshaw, Roderick Shaw, Charles Swain, E. Wall, Douglas Watson, Mary Webb, Robert Williamson, Jocelyn Zander, Elizabeth Martin, W. J. Bergner, Arthur Boyd, Mary Boyd, Dorothy Braund, Noel Counihan, K. Friedberger, J. M. Gill, David Gough, Judy Hunter, J. K. Lavett, Y. Lenne, M. Cockburn Mercer, Helen Noble, Sidney Nolan, V. G. O'Connor, Roy Opie, Albert Reid, B. R. Sargent, Florence Thompson, Danila Vassilieff, Neville W. Bunning, Gwendolin Grant, Joy Hester, V. Adolfsson, Mary Harris, J. Hick, S. Keene, L. Kohlhagen, E. Milston, Clifton Pugh, D. Roberts, Tasman Fehlberg. Myer Gallery, Melbourne.
- 1945, September: Victorian Artists' Society Spring Show
- 1945, November: Group show at The Blue Door Gallery, 17 George Pde., off 113 Collins St., Melbourne
- 1946, February: Group show including George Bell, Lina Bryans, Madge Freeman, Louise Thomas. Ian Bow and Francis Roy Thompson, The Blue Door Gallery, 17 George Pde., off 113 Collins St., Melbourne
- 1946, October: Past Students of the National Gallery group show with Charles Bush, Howard Matthews, H. A. Barnes, Lindsay Edwards, Kathleen Barnes, Grahame King, Edward Heffernan, Laurence Phillips, Nornie Gude, P. Gare, G. Browning, L. Pendlebury, Phyl Waterhouse, and J. Frawley. Myer's Art Gallery, 6th floor, Bourke Street Store, Melbourne
- 1946, April: Victorian Artists' Society autumn salon.
- 1946, November: first solo show, of works made at Potts Point and Kings Cross, Sydney, Myer's Art Gallery, 6th floor, Bourke Street Store, Melbourne
  - 1947, 5 June–July: solo show at Moreton Galleries, 5 Edward Street, Brisbane, Queensland
- 1948, May: Show of Australian artists Lesley Bowker, Eleanor Martin, Ian Beer, Bettina McMahon, Alannah Coleman, June Mendoza and Peter Beaumont, organised by Lesley Bowker in her studio at 119 George St., Sydney
- 1949, from 9 May: Group exhibition of 60 members of the Society of Artists, David Jones gallery, 7th floor (Mezzanine), Elizabeth Street, Sydney
- 1949, 21 June–1 July: An exhibition of paintings by Alannah Coleman and Arthur Evan Read, Moreton Galleries, 5 Edward Street, Brisbane, Queensland,
- 1949, September: group exhibition of floral paintings, David Jones gallery, 7th floor (Mezzanine), Elizabeth Street, Sydney
- 1949, November, 5–13: Fern Tree Gully Arts Society, sixth annual exhibition, including Edith Alsop, Frank C Andrew, Len Annois, Edward Borovansky, Susan Boyd, Charles Bush, Daisy Campbell, Donald F. Campbell, Maie Casey, Ronald Center, A. Clayfield, Alannah Coleman, W. G. Collins, Eugene Cooper, Margaret Dickinson, Russell Drysdale, Alfred Dunstan, John Farmer, Harold A. Fleming, Eric L. Frazer, Norah Gurdon, Harry Harrison, Edward Heffernan, H. F. Hill, Arnold Holst, Marshall Hughes, Graeme Inson, Kenneth Jack, James R. Haughton, Margaret Joske, Frank Kane, Gavin Kleinert, Mary Macqueen, Max Middleton, John Morrissey, George Neville, Barbara Newman, Max Newton, Helen Ogilvie, Valerie O'Neill, Dick Ovenden, Esther Paterson, Gustav Pillig, M. Rankin, R. W. Rowed, John Rowell, Eugenie B. Rowell, Kenneth Rowell, Dora Serle, Frank Sherrin, Jeannettie Sheldon, Arnold Shore, Douglas Smart, Eric Smith, Peter Purves Smith, Audrey Snell, Charles Swancott, Eveline Syme, Florence Tame, Ken Thompson, Roma Thompson, Noel Thorpe, Kit Turner, Phyl Waterhouse, Percy Watson, Julius Wentcher, Charles Wheeler, Betty Buck, William Constable.

== Publications ==
- Coleman, A. (1955) dust-jacket illustration for Kershaw, Alister (1955), Murder in France, Constable
- Coleman, Alannah (1971–1989). "Letters to Charles Bush : 1971–1989". State Library of Victoria.
- –––––––– (1981) ‘Opera: London triumph for Nolan’, The Bulletin, Sydney, 3 November 1981, p. 72
- Coleman, A. (1955) dust-jacket illustration for Kershaw, Alister (1955), Murder in France, Constable
- –––––––– (1982) 'The impact of a world without time' The Bulletin 16 Nov 1982, p. 114
- –––––––– (1985). review of Images of Sydney, 1890–1950. Arts Review.
- –––––––– (1986) A. Oscar : an exhibition of paintings (Coleman is writer of introduction), Miguel Solá (Writer of added text), Windsor Arts Centre. Catalogue of an exhibition held at Arts Centre (Windsor, USA), 21 Oct. –. 7 Nov. 1986
