= Sam Fullbrook =

Australian artist (1922–2004)

Sam Fullbrook (14 April 1922 – 3 February 2004) was an Australian artist who was a winner of the Archibald Prize for portraiture and the Wynne Prize for landscape. He was described as "last of the bushman painters" (a rural art tradition). However Fullbrook was fine art-trained and his sophisticated works are in every State art museum in Australia and international collections.

== Early life ==
Fullbrook was born Samuel Sydney, named after his father, Joseph Henry Sydney, but later used his mother's maiden name of Fullbrook. He was born in the inner city suburb of Chippendale in Sydney in 1922.

From 1937 he worked as a timber cutter in Gloucester, New South Wales. He served in the Australian army and worked in manual jobs before discovering his bent for art. After the outbreak of World War II, he enlisted with the Australian Infantry Forces in 1940 and the following year was posted in Palestine but did not see active service. In the years 1943 to 1945, he trained in rifles in the Middle East and served in New Guinea.

At that time, he discovered reading and painting through the Army Adult Education program and after the war, in 1946, he enrolled in the National Gallery of Victoria Art School in Melbourne, under a federal government retraining program. Among his contemporaries at the art school were John Brack, Clifton Pugh and Fred Williams. Fullbrook painted his first portrait in Yarraville on the sugar wharf. In 1947, he moved to West Melbourne and began selling his work through the Victorian Artists’ Society.

== Career ==
Fullbrook was to have a constant and wide ranging career as a painter, beginning in 1948 with his first joint exhibition at Tye’s Gallery with art school classmate Tim Nicholl. In the same year, his father died and Fullbrook returned to Sydney, where he converted his father’s shop into an art studio. To support his painting, Fullbrook went to far North Queensland for the cane-cutting season.

Around this time, sharks and "Bondi virgins" made their first appearance in his works. He returned to Queensland where he befriended James Wieneke of Moreton Gallery and was employed by Richard Morley, founder of the Blake Prize. That was when he discovered a talent for landscapes.

His first solo exhibition was held at the Waterside Workers’ Hall, Sydney in 1952. That same year, he had a second solo show at the Moreton Gallery, Brisbane, and received honourable mention in the Archibald Prize for his portrait of his contemporary, potter Bernard Sahm. Fullbrook then travelled west across Australia, setting up a studio in Marble Bar in Western Australia, also working as a miner, cane cutter and stockman.

In 1971, he lost most of his work in a fire at his Brisbane studio, but recovered to continue working in the Queensland Darling Downs, in Sydney, on the Gold Coast and in Melbourne. Leveson Street Gallery in a 1974 issue of The Bulletin, listed Fulbrook amongst the artists Dorothy Braund, Robert Dickerson, Nornie Gude, Hans Heysen, Louis Kahan, Mary Mac Queen, Helen Ogilvie, Lloyd Rees, Constance Stokes, and Roland Wakelin whom it represented.

Fullbrook set up studios all over the country and each change in events and environment would prompt a new direction in his work. His main series were the "Darling River series", the "Phoenix" series in Buderim, Queensland, "Circus", "Brisbane River", and "The Shearer" series, among others. His oeuvre ranged over biblical themes, horse-racing, aboriginal Australians, Pilbara landscapes, Bondi, wildlife, floral works, and studio nudes.

Artist Robert Jacks said Fullbrook painted "some of the most beautiful portraits ever painted in Australia." Among them are former Australian Governor-General Sir John Kerr and media entrepreneur Reg Grundy. Others include Pat Brown and Bernard Sahm, artists, jockeys and members of the public. The Kerr portrait was submitted to hang in Parliament House but was rejected for being "caricature".

== Painting style and themes ==
Fullbrook's light and airy works were soft figuration bordering on abstraction in high-tone coloured patches, but leaving the subject entirely recognisable. Most of his paintings and scenes were about his personal interests and life experiences. He painted in oils, but worked in pastels and watercolour as well as exhibiting drawings. Reviewing a 1995 National Gallery of Victoria exhibition, Racing Colors, art critic Robert Nelson described him as:

"A colourist... Fullbrook's forte lies in the difficult balancing of patches of pinks and teal, or striations of lilac and dashes of cadmium green."

== Exposure ==
Fullbrook won the Archibald Prize in 1974 with the painting Jockey Norman Stephens. He won the Wynne Prize in 1963 with Sandhills on the Darling, and shared the Wynne Prize the following year with Trees in a Landscape showing jacaranda trees in a Sydney scene.

From the 1960s to 2001, his works were included in national tours and tours to the U.S. He exhibited in New York in 1989. He had solo shows in galleries in every Australian state.

A prolific artist, Fullbrook's works can be found in every major Australian museum, every state museum and in many city gallery collections, clubs and universities. He has been collected commercially and privately in Australia, the United States, Canada, China, Japan, the U.K., New Zealand, Europe and Malaysia.

== Personal life ==
Fullbrook married Janice Greenwood in 1966, but his wife suicided the following year, and is buried in the Walkerston Cemetery, Mackay, Queensland. In 1983, he remarried, to American, Mary Jane.

After a lifetime's travelling, Fullbrook decided to live permanently in Brisbane from the mid-60s. He took a property "Crosshill" on the Darling Downs in the 1990s. He was an Australia Day Ambassador in 2001.

At his property in central Victoria, he kept 20 racehorses and entered them at country race meetings.

== Death ==
Fullbrook died of cancer in 2004 at Daylesford Hospital, aged 81.

== Awards ==
- 1963 Wynne Prize
- 1964 Wynne Prize (shared with David Strachan)
- 1966 David Jones Art Prize
- 1967 H C Richards Memorial Prize for Painting, Townsville Prize
- 1969 H C Richards Memorial Prize for Painting, L. J. Harvey Memorial Prize for Drawing
- 1970 Maude Vizard-Wholohan Prize
- 1974 Archibald Prize

Awards
Preceded by Janet Dawson	Archibald Prize; 1974 for Jockey Norman Stephens	Succeeded by Kevin Connor
