= Phyl Waterhouse =

20th-century Australian woman artist and gallerist

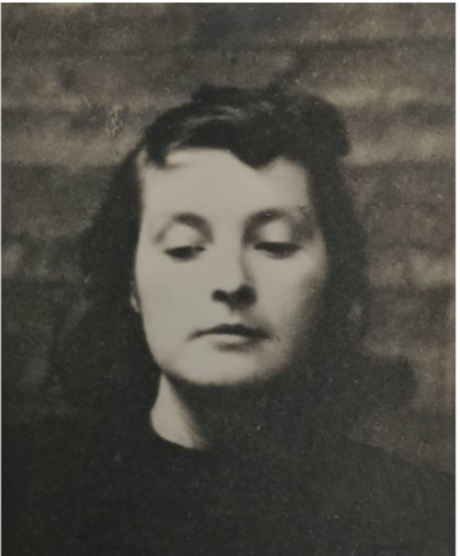
- Phyl Waterhouse in 1947 photographed by Charles Bush
- Born: Phyllis Paulina Waterhouse; April 17, 1917; Moonee Ponds
- Died: April 9, 1989 (aged 71); Aireys Inlet
- Education: National Gallery of Victoria Art School
- Known for: artist and director of Leveson Street Gallery
- Style: post-impressionist
- Partner: Charles Bush
- Parents: Stuart Frank Waterhouse (father); Lucy Eliza Waterhouse (mother)

Phyllis Paulina Waterhouse (17 April 1917, Moonee Ponds—9 April 1989, Aireys Inlet) was an Australian artist and gallerist.

== Early life ==
She was the daughter of Lucy Eliza Waterhouse, and railwayman Stuart Frank Waterhouse of 35 Combermere Street, Moonee Ponds, who had migrated from England to Bacchus Marsh.

== Training and early career ==
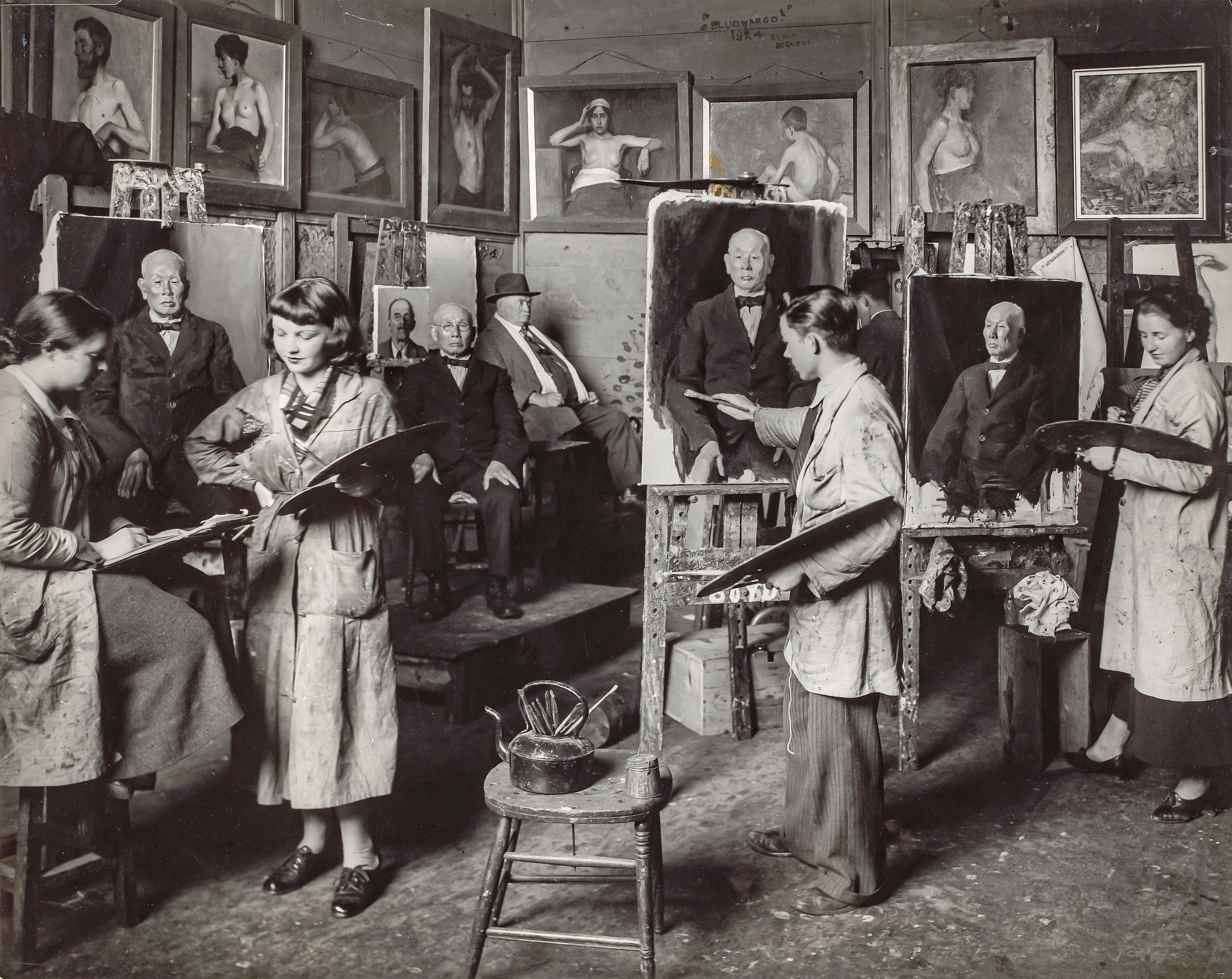
Melbourne National Gallery School life class in 1935 (L-R) Phyl Waterhouse, Alannah Coleman, Charles Bush, Jean McInnes and Miss Eastwood (most not standing in front of their own canvases). Lining the walls, works by Hugh Ramsay, John Longstaff, Max Meldrum, James Quinn, Isaac Cohen and Charles Wheeler. Table Talk magazine

Phyl Waterhouse developed an early interest in drawing that intensified due to chronic illness as a child. Her parents encouraged her and she took watercolour classes at the Eastern Market, Melbourne. From 1932 she studied for seven years under William B. McInnes and Charles Wheeler at the National Gallery Victoria art schools, where she and fellow student Charles Bush became teenage friends. Contemporaries at the art school included Sidney Nolan and his first wife, Elizabeth Patterson, Howard Matthews, Joy Hester and her future husband Bert Tucker, and Alannah Coleman.

They struggled financially in those Depression years and Phyl described how "come Friday, we would put boiling water through the back of the canvas, wash it all off, put new size on, and start again". In a 1965 interview, Waterhouse recalled her time there as:

...a wonderful, wonderful tradition. And although the rats sat on the gas stove and cleaned their whiskers, we had a marvellous time, and we used to get here at 10:00 in the morning and leave at 10:00 at night. I had a few months under Bernard Hall who was a head of the art school then, and [he] put steel into my soul, because I'd worked for a long time on the antique sandled foot, the plaster cast of it. and I thought this wasn't too bad. He came down and in one sweep of his hand, wiped the whole thing out and said, "Why don't you observe it!" This was shattering. I burst into tears and ... from that moment on, I developed a donkey-like stubbornness and persisted with my painting.

Before moving to their own home and studio in Essendon, the couple lived in her parents house at Clarinda Road, Moonee Ponds, where Ivor Hele made a drawing of her in 1945; and Douglas Watson painted her portrait in oils in 1946; and Bush's surviving drawing of 1947 is of a still-life made in the house.

According to John Hetherington, their co-habiting had become necessary for Bush because he had fallen out with his father at age seventeen and had to leave home. Waterhouse and he established their first studio together in an ex-plumber's shop in Essendon which they rented for 5 shillings a week. Later, their accommodation and studios were a former grocer shop in North Melbourne, in which they established Leveson Street Gallery in 1962.

== Exhibiting artist ==
Waterhouse first exhibited with student colleagues in 1939 at Riddell's Gallery, as recorded in The Bulletin:

‘...the show of a triumvirate of youth - Phyl Waterhouse, Arthur Read and Charles Bush [...] have hung their pictures upon the walls of Riddell's galleries. Phyl, who is the feminine element among the three, wore a snood and all-black on the opening afternoon. She and her confreres were students together at the Gallery. This show is their first, and their canvases are moderately-sized and -priced. Friends rallied round them on the first day, so that the stairs were far too narrow.’

Waterhouse's career was interrupted by World War II during which she took an army civilian job, but she was again showing work in 1945. Her partner, Charles Bush, served as a war artist in Papua and New Guinea.

After the war, Bush's British Council grant enabled the couple to travel to London on the Otranto in early 1950, and they visited Italy, France and Spain to work. Their farewell party was held at the newly opened Stanley Coe Gallery in December 1949. While away, her mother announced at Phyl's exhibition at Georges Gallery that her work had been shown at the Royal Academy, London. Sculptor John Dowie, Edward and Ursula Hayward, and Ted and Nan Smith were in London together with Bush and Waterhouse, and to economise they shared accommodation in Earls Court. Dowie made a pencil study, one of few surviving from the time, of Waterhouse sitting in the flat before the friends set out across Europe.

Waterhouse found employment to augment Bush's grant money, working as a telephonist and a chauffeur, and continued to take other work throughout her career, part of which, after 1962, was the management of Leveson Street Gallery. On their return from England and finding the income from painting was too tenuous, she worked a switchboard in a radio station at night, which allowed time for painting during the day.

While she was overseas in 1950, Waterhouse's oil entitled Country Town won the £100 Crouch memorial prize at the Ballarat Art Gallery; her second success in the award after the National Gallery of Victoria purchased her 1949 entry. On their return to Australia in 1952, Waterhouse painted and exhibited mainly in Melbourne, Adelaide and Brisbane.

The frequency of her exhibiting increased over the mid- to late-1950s and into the 1980s. She entered major prizes and awards, winning several in the 1980s and her work was acquired for major collections of regional and state galleries, as well as the National Gallery of Australia.

== Style ==
McCulloch in 1945 associates Waterhouse with Margery Rankin and Eveline Syme, and in 2006 classifies her work as ‘modulated’ post-impressionism, and her main subjects as ‘lyrical depictions of buildings, trees and people’, with partilcular talent in portraiture. Waterhouse considered herself a 'realist' with a love of the heightened texture, colour and the treatment of form and composition in post-impressionism. Though she would paint an unfamiliar landscape on-site, she described her increasing frustration with working en plein air, where 'your painting would nine times out of ten end up face down in the sand' in strong winds, and so worked increasingly 'from sketches, from colour notes, from little notes made, taking them back to my studio, thinking about them, and putting down what I felt about this; my impression of a subject.' She made attempts at abstraction but the response discouraged her.

In 1965, Waterhouse noted that, for portraiture, she preferred subjects whose personality appealed to her. She worked directly from the model first, but not in a "photographic manner". Then, having established their appearance, would continue alone in the studio with her impression of the subject to achieve "a good painting first and foremost", with a sufficient likeness.

Attracted by its support of individuals without allegiance to a specific school, the couple were affiliated with the Independent Group, amongst Lina Bryans, Edith Alsop, Madge Freeman, Bernard Lawson, Norman Macgeorge, Margaret Pestell, James Quinn, Dora Serle, Eveline Syme, and R. Malcolm Warner, most of whom were post-impressionists and early modernists, and together showed their paintings annually. Waterhouse also exhibited with the Melbourne Contemporary Artists which had split from the original Contemporary Art Society.

== Reception ==
The Bulletin commented on Waterhouse's first exhibition in April 1939:

‘Every artist worth his salt is an experimenter, and Phyl Waterhouse, Arthur Read and Charles Bush, showing their wares at Riddell's Galleries, Melbourne, are three products of the National Gallery school who are obviously trying to do something. But they are confronted with the possibility, if they climb out of one pit, of falling into another. Mr. Read is flirting with various forms of expressionism, and his friends are glancing in the same direction. Few of their attempts merit exhibition more than the average pupil's.’

The Sun critic George Bell, reviewing her small paintings in 1945, reported that, “Among many outstanding pictures are ... two architectural pieces In charming and reticent color by Phil [sic] Waterhouse...," when she showed alongside her partner Bush, Harold Herbert, George Colville, Isabel Tweddle, Charles Wheeler, James Quinn, Louise Thomas, Arnold Shore, Ian Bow and Norah Gurdon at the Blue Door gallery, 17 George Pde., off 113 Collins St., Melbourne.

Also that year, Daryl Lindsay, director of the National Gallery, whose collection policies were by then known as conservative, judged the Geelong Art Gallery Association's competition and, finding no work worthy of it, did not award the £75 J. H. McPhillimy prize. Nevertheless, The Herald noted that Waterhouse's "Pine Trees, Somers" "caught his eye".

Reviewing the Melbourne Contemporary Artists exhibition at the Athenaeum Gallery in October 1945, which was also opened by Daryl Lindsay, George Bell commented that. "Phil Waterhouse shapes up seriously with two of her townscapes". Waterhouse appealed even to the conservative taste of Robert Menzies, who opened her solo show at Georges Gallery, at 162 Collins St., Melbourne, not long before the last exhibition of Menzies’ Australian Academy of Art. His praise of her "lucidity" he contrasted with the "incoherence" in modernist art.

Her solo show at George's gallery in 1950 incorporated Australian paintings with drawings she sent from England. The Bulletin reported that:

'They are vigorous sketches, one of the most vivid being “Hampton Court Avenue,” in which the dark trees in the foreground are relieved by the red building behind them. “Country Hotel” and “Gisborne” have atmosphere about them; the portrait of Jane Casey hasn't. It may or may not be a good likeness, but the artist hasn't given her sitter any air to breathe with.'

In review of the June 1959 group exhibition at Australian Galleries, Bulletin critic Mervyn Skipper, then in the last year of his life, extemporises a colourful comparison of the artists with the bodgie razor gangs of the era to indicate that these 'tortured Van Goghs,' 'flinging pots of paint at canvas and labelling the result “abstraction,”' had discarded all sense of style and craft. He declares that Phyl Waterhouse's 'familiar shorthand has degenerated into something close to a scrawl' in her Green Still Life.

Patrick Hutchings writing in The Bulletin, on the 1961 Perth Art Prize, won that year by John Olson, remarked that Phyl Waterhouse's Queensiand Copper Country, amongst the many abstractions "redeems the pledge of representative painting with a Boydish folded landscape of soft peach and buff, and shares with Henri Bastian's primitive 'Cooktown' the task of reminding us that direct statement is still possible in painting".

Writing on her entry in the 1970s Archibald Prize, which included radical works, Elwyn Lynn considered Waterhouse, with partner Bush, to be amongst the "dedicated, dogged portrait painters".

== Leveson Street Gallery ==
In 1962, along with their friend June Davies, Phyl and Charles founded the Leveson Street Gallery, on the corner of Leveson and Victoria Streets, North Melbourne, which they later relocated to Carlton as Leveson Gallery (in the building later occupied by Bridget McDonnell Gallery) and it operated until 1985. Its exhibitions were mainly those of emerging artists, and when interviewed in 1965 Waterhouse proposed that it was the first artist-run gallery in Melbourne. Robert Grieve, writing about the gallery in The Bulletin in 1967 considered that its 'high standing among painters' was due to the directors themselves being artists.

After her husband's death, Constance Stokes found herself and her family with a large debt. She had not exhibited since 1933 and, having three teenagers, had ceased painting by the late 1950s. It was Phyl Waterhouse who encouraged her to work toward a solo show at Leveson Street. On 29 November 1964, the exhibition of over forty works opened, was favourably reviewed and sold well, so that Stokes received four thousand guineas.

Leveson Street Gallery listed the artists it represented in a September 1974 issue of The Bulletin as: Veda Arrowsmith, Charles Bush, Mary Beeston, Dorothy Braund, Italian sculptor Pino Conte, Robert Dickerson, William Drew, Tom Fantl, Sam Fullbrook, Robert Grieve, Nornie Gude, Hans Heysen, Max Hurley, Haughton James, Louis Kahan, Juliana Keats, George Lawrence, Francis Lymbumer, Mary Mac Queen, David Newbury, Helen Ogilvie, L. S. Pendlebury, Arthur Evan Read, Lloyd Rees, Bernhard Rust, William Robinson, Max Sherlock, Julian Smith, Constance Stokes, Dorothy Sutton, Roland Wakelin, Phyl Waterhouse, Douglas Watson and Maxwell Wilks.

== Personal life ==
The couple only to married in 1979, when Waterhouse was 62, and further evidence of her lifelong feminist ethos was the portrait of suffragette Vida Goldstein, which Waterhouse painted in 1944 from a photograph made when Goldstein attended the International Suffrage Conference in the USA in 1902. It is held in the National Library of Australia. She objected to being referred to as a woman painter:

You would have thought that this was the sort of thing that went out when Queen Victoria was reigning and women painted under noms de plume, but believe me, it hasn't...your painting [should be] viewed as a painting, as a work of art, completely irrespective of whether you're a woman painter.

Her sympathies were also with the labour and trade union movements, and she was one of 85 exhibitors who were recruited by Noel Counihan for the 6th May Day Art Exhibition in the Lower Melbourne Town Hall, from 13 to 18 June 1958. Waterhouse was likewise a ready contributor to charitable causes, for example, flower arrangements for hospital funds, the design of tickets for a 1955 Red Cross "Carnival Fantasy", murals representing the ancient Greek Olympics for The Olympic Torch Ball, held in St Kilda during the opening night of the Games (held that year in Melbourne) to aid the Society for the Prevention of Cruelty to Children; and donation of works for an Anti-Cancer Campaign. In the 1960s she created three murals for the Royal Children's Hospital.

Waterhouse died at Aireys Inlet on 9 April 1989, aged 71, and Bush, only months later, aged 69. In the Castlemaine Art Museum, which holds six of her works, there is a photographic portrait of Phyl taken at Aireys Inlet by Charles in the 1980s.

Retrospectively, in 1993 Charles Nodrum Gallery, Melbourne featured her work, with others, in "The Changing Face of Melbourne”, and, in 2000, Mirka Mora remembered Waterhouse and Bush dining with Georges Mora and herself at their Balzac Restaurant in the late 1950s and early 1960s.

== Exhibitions ==
- 1940, April: Group show with Arthur Read and Charles Bush, Riddell Gallery, 190 Little Collins Street, Melbourne
- 1945: Group show, Blue Door gallery, 17 George Pde., off 113 Collins St., Melbourne.
- 1945, 23 October—3 November: Melbourne Contemporary Artists’ Society, Athenaeum Gallery
- 1946, 30 April—18 May: Myer Gallery, group show of floral still life, 6th floor, Myer Bourke Street Store, Melbourne
- 1946, October: Melbourne Contemporary Artists, Athenaeum Gallery
- 1948: Solo show at Georges Gallery, Melbourne
- 1949, October/November: Melbourne Contemporary Artists group show, Melbourne Artists’ Society Gallery
- 1950, February: Melbourne Contemporary Artists group show, Stanley Coe Galleries
- 1950, August: Watercolours, with Brian Jones, Louis Kahan, R. Malcolm Warner, Stanley Coe Galleries
- 1951, September: Independents group show with Edith Alsop, Lina Bryans, Charles Bush, R. Malcolm Warner and the recently deceased James Quinn. Athenaeum Gallery, Melbourne
- 1952, August: Independent Group, group show with Eveline Syme, Edith Alsop, R. Malcolm Warner, Dora Serle, Lina Bryans, Peter Bray Gallery, Melbourne
- 1952, 25 August—8 September: Charles Bush, Phyl Waterhouse joint show Johnstone Gallery (nine oil paintings and two watercolours by Phyl Waterhouse)
- 1953: Dunlop Art Prize, including Scott Pendlebury (winner), Arthur Boyd, Kenneth Jack, Graham Moore, and Len Annois. Tye's Gallery, Melbourne
- 1953: Victoria's Snowlands, Victorian Artists' Society Gallery
- 1955, May: Contemporary Art Society of Australia, Preston Motors, Melbourne* 1955: Dante Alighieri scholarship award show, AGNSW
- 1956: £1500 “Women's Weekly”, portrait competition, AGNSW
- 1957: “Women's Weekly”, portrait competition, AGNSW
- 1958: “Women's Weekly”, portrait competition, AGNSW
- 1958, March: Independents Group, Athenaeum Gallery
- 1958, 13–18 June: 6 May Day Art Exhibition, Lower Melbourne Town Hall
- 1959, March: included in Australian Contemporary Paintings, recent acquisitions, AGNSW
- 1959, March: entrant in the Blake Prize
- 1959: Blaxland Gallery, group show of landscapes with Thomas Gleghorn, Robert Juniper, Robert Grieve, J. Carington Smith, Judy Cassab, Herbert Flugleman, Sali Herman, Lloyd Rees, W. E. Pidgeon, Jan Molvig, Roy Fluke, Irvine Homer, John Coburn and Charles Bush
- 1959, June: with Sylvaine Selig, Tate Adams, Edwin Tanner, Robert Dickerson, Ray Crooke, Arthur Boyd in Australian Galleries 3rd anniversary exhibition, Collingwood
- 1960, January: Sulman Art Prize entrant (a self-portrait)
- 1960, August: Third Anniversary group show, Clune Galleries, 59 Macleay Street, Potts Point, Sydney
- 1960, December: Small paintings 10x6 inches selected by director Vi Johns, John Martin's Art Gallery, Rundle Mall, Adelaide
- 1961, February: Wynne Prize
- 1961, April: Royal S.A. Society of Arts Autumn Exhibition, Adelaide
- 1961, December: Perth Art Prize entrant, Perth Art Gallery (now AGWA)
- 1964, 30 April–10 May: Paintings by Phil Waterhouse, Studio Nundah, Canberra
- 1965: Winemakers Art Prize, multi-artist exhibition; Art prize sponsored by The Wine and Brandy Producers' Association of Victoria.
- 1974, 19–20 March: entrant in Liberman Memorial Prize, The Age gallery
- 1976, 11 September: 1976 Caulfield City Council Invitation Art Exhibition, Caulfield Arts Centre

== Publications by ==
Alongside William Dobell, Ernst Buckmaster, Nornie Guide, Sir William Dargie, Esther Paterson and others, Waterhouse was a contributor of illustrations for a children's book published in 1961 in aid of Yooralla.

== Awards ==
- 1949 and 1950: Crouch Prize
- 1956: Henry Caselli Richards Prize
- 1959: Australian Women's Weekly prize
- 1966: Grafton prize
- 1980: Albury art prize
- 1981: St Catherine's Art Award,
- 1981: Woodend Art Award
- 1982 and 1983: Burke Hall Award
- 1985: St Kevin's Award

== Represented in collections ==
- Art Gallery of South Australia
- Art Gallery of Western Australia
- National Gallery of Victoria
- Queensland Art Gallery
- Parliament House
- National Library of Australia.
- Bendigo Art Gallery
- Art Gallery of Ballarat
- Benalla art gallery
- Castlemaine Art Museum
- Geelong Art Gallery
- Broken Hill Art Gallery
- University of Melbourne
