= Fellowship of Australian Artists =

Australian art organisation

Murray Griffin (left), William Dargie, Dick Ovenden (in front) and Violet Mclnnes with Septimus Power's The Buckjumper prepare for the first exhibition of the Fellowship. From The Herald 13 November 1950

The Melbourne-based Fellowship of Australian Artists was established in 1950 in response to the demise of the Australian Academy of Art.

== Founding ==
After its founding in August 1950, the Sydney Sun reported that the organisation was supported by Melbourne businessmen, one of whom, the art collector George Page-Cooper, made his furniture store gallery available to the group free of charge for its first exhibition.

Painter, cartoonist and caricaturist Richard Arthur (Dick) Ovenden (1897–1972) was organiser and secretary who in the 1920s had worked for Labor Call as 'Nevo’, the Herald and Weekly Times and the Australasian Seamen’s Journal. He invited Lieutenant-General Sir Stanley Savige to be president and Robert Menzies its patron. The avowedly anti-communist bibliophile and collector John Kinmont "Jack" Moir (1893–1958), manager of Paynes Bon Marché store, 138-144 Bourke Street, was an associate who confidently proclaimed that "this lusty infant will survive its growing pains and develop a strong body."

== Membership ==
Membership was open only to "professional artists." Members and exhibitors, of which 29 were counted in the inaugural exhibition, included:

- John Allcot
- Len Annois
- Howard Ashton
- Richard Ashton
- Will Ashton
- Alan D. Baker
- A.M.E. Bale
- Rex Battarbee
- Evelyn Baxter
- George Benson
- Allan Bernaldo
- Rechid Bey
- Shirley Bourne
- Arthur Boyd
- Rex Bramleigh
- Ernest Buckmaster
- Norma Bull
- Charles Bush
- Donald Campbell
- Amalie Colquhoun
- Archie Colquhoun
- Elizabeth Colquhoun
- Noel Counihan
- Sybil Craig
- Charles Crampton
- Ron Crawford
- George Crossley
- William Dargie
- Aileen Dent
- Douglas Dundas
- Margaret Dunn
- Cathleen Edkins
- Mary Edwards
- John Eldershaw
- John Farmer
- Alma Figuerola
- William Frater
- John Gardner
- Esmond George
- James Gleeson
- Harold Greenhill
- Ambrose Griffin
- Harley Griffiths
- Harry Hanke
- Leon Hansen
- Melville Haysom
- Sali Herman
- Hans Heysen
- Nora Heysen
- Dermont Hillier
- Edith Holmes
- Polly Hurry
- Graeme Inson
- Kenneth Jack
- Geoff Jones
- Robert Juniper
- Louis Kahan
- Roger Kemp
- Michael Kmit
- Charles Lancaster
- David Lawrance
- Daryl Lindsay
- Norman Lindsay
- C. Salis Lloyd
- Douglas Pratt
- Septimus Power
- James Quinn
- Charles Wheeler.

== Ethos ==
Though conservative, the Fellowship claimed to accommodate a variety of styles, but stipulated that in accepting works for exhibition that they display “a basic minimum of craftsmanship.” Justice John Barry, in opening the group's first exhibition, considered it a "satisfactory beginning" by "representative" artists, and remarked that:

Our best artists insisted on the right of each human being to be different, to deviate from uniformity, within the proper restraints necessary in society.

The Fellowship supported the imposition of tariffs on art coming into the country to prevent a "flood of cheap imported rubbish" against which Australian artists would have to compete. Its position opposed that of the National Gallery of Victoria and the Australian Art Association who saw import duty as disadvantaging the many Australian artists then working overseas.

== Reception ==
Argus critic Arnold Shore remarked of the Fellowship's first exhibition that "well-known Melbourne and interstate painters are represented by average works."

Alan Warren, in The Herald, dismissed the same show as "academic, and even when pleasant, commonplace," and considered that the "slick, incisive realism" of Buckminster's landscape and portrait left "little to be said," while A. D. and Amalie Colquhoun, William Dargie, Murray Griffin and Violet Mclnnes were merely proficient.

Noting the absence of "original and creative artists, William Dobell, Russell Drysdale, Donald Friend," and querying whether the Fellowship sought to "repeat Australian art history," Warren quoted George Bell's reaction: "The public will enjoy it. It Is not hard to take, as it Is designed expressly for its purpose — supply of pictures rather than ideas," and proposed that the Australian Academy of Art "failed for this reason", and because it attempted "to dominate other artists and the public, and to force general acceptance of Its own standards of art."

George Page-Cooper challenged Warren's association of the Fellowship with the failed Academy, since it:

proposed no title such as "Academician," or "F.A.A." It simply proposed itself as an organisation representative of culture in Australia, to foster a permanent appreciation of art to protect the artist and creative effort—and the buyer—and create for culture an unfailing recognition by an increasingly discerning public. Artists were asked to exhibit for one reason only—for the benefit of Australian art, based on sound draughtsmanship. The Fellowship hoped eventually to influence the creation of a "Department of culture" with activities commencing in the schools.

While listing artists, "by no means traditionalists; for instance many of the Meldrum school", who had "accepted Fellowship", Page-Cooper admitted that some who had been approached had refused, including George Bell of the Contemporary Art Society who had explained that "our respective interpretation of sound art and draughtmanship differ so fundamentally as to make co-operation impossible." Page-Cooper quoted one of the plaintiffs in the 1943 Dobell Joshua Smith case Mary Edwards' supporting letter: "I am wholly with you in believing that the present trend in Australian art needs to be met by banding together to fight for sanity and wholesomeness," while Joshua Smith himself sent a telegram supporting the Fellowship's objectives as '"worthy".

== Exhibitions ==
The Fellowship proposed to have group shows of its members' work in a different capital city annually, starting with Melbourne where for the first show Ovenden quickly assembled artworks by notable artists over one month. The highest price sought was 250 guineas (equal to A$17,134 in 2026) for Mary Edwards' work, which the Sun News-Pictorial jokingly estimated was "fifty guineas a square foot!".

- 1950, 13 November: Tye's Gallery, 100 Burke Street, Melbourne, opened by Justice Barry
