= Maude Vizard-Wholohan =

Australian artist and benefactor

Elizabeth Maude Vizard-Wholohan (13 August 1859 – 7 September 1950), commonly referred to as Mrs Wholohan, was a South Australian artist and benefactor.

== History ==
Wholohan was born Elizabeth Jane Vizard in Brompton, South Australia, daughter of Joseph Eliza(?) Vizard (died c. 30 April 1911).

She married Patrick Francis Foran Wholohan (c. 1851 – 15 September 1935) at St Mary's (Catholic) Church, Port Adelaide on 20 December 1880. In 1935 they had a home at Alexandra Avenue, Rose Park.

She studied painting under James Ashton at his Norwood Art School 1891, where she did some excellent still lifes and flower paintings. In 1893 she joined the Adelaide Easel Club, where her husband (head master at a school in Knightsbridge, later at Marryatville) was president. Her flower paintings continued to attract favorable comment. Her work sold readily at the London Exhibition of Australian Art in 1898, and her name was mentioned by Ashton alongside that of Hans Heysen when talking of promising students and alongside that of Marie Tuck by The Advertiser's art critic.

The Adelaide Easel Club, which was a breakaway from the South Australian Society of Arts, rejoined the parent body in 1901. Wholohan continued to exhibit with the Society, but she was criticised for monotonous choice of subject. By 1903 she had joined the South Australian School of Design She continued to paint, and also did some good work in sculpture and furniture-making but never achieved further praise from critics.

She was an aficionado of music performance, and for a few years sponsored a scholarship for music composition, presented in conjunction with Hooper Brewster-Jones's prizes. Some, perhaps all, of the recipients were:

- 1921 shared between Edith Piper and Gladys Bruer
- 1923 shared between Doris Collett and Spruhan Kennedy
- 1925 Captain Hugh King of the Adelaide Metropolitan Choral Society (award repeated 1926)

She died at her home, 3 Webb Street, Rose Park She had no children or relatives in Australia; she left £10,000 in her will to fund an annual Maude Vizard-Wholohan Prize of £200 for works by South Australian artists, a portrait and landscape or seascape in alternate years, the winning picture to become the property of the Art Gallery of South Australia. Opinions differed greatly as to the merits of such restrictive conditions.

In 1954 the Art Gallery board disclaimed the trust and sought a revision of its conditions from the Supreme Court. The sticking-point was apparently that administration of the trust was to be in conjunction with "an outside art group" i.e. the South Australian Society of Arts (SASA).

It is not certain whether the SASA made any awards earlier, but the Art Gallery of South Australia dates the Maude Vizard-Wholohan Prize from 1957. In its revised form there is no restriction to SA residents, there are up to five categories with different prizes, none necessarily awarded in any year, and the Art Gallery has the option to dispose of the acquired works.

- 1957 Louis Robert James, Hans Heysen, Allan C. Glover, Murray Griffin
- 1958 Clifton Pugh, Hector Gilliland, Lesbia Thorpe
- 1959 John Perceval, Charles Bush, Brian Seidel
- 1960 Len Annois, Robert Grieve Udo Sellbach (not in ref)
- 1961 James Cant, Kenneth Jack, Brian Seidel
- 1962 Eileen Mayo (prints); Jacqueline Hick, Len Annois
- 1963 William Peascod, Kenneth Jack
- 1964 Jacqueline Hick, Henry Salkauskas, Lesbia Thorpe
- 1965 Douglas Roberts, Brian Seidel, Pru Medlin, Erica Baneth (sculpture)
- 1966 Mervyn Ashmore Smith (watercolor), Geoffrey Brown (print)
- 1967 Brian Seidel, Franz Kempf (two prizes)
- 1970 Sam Fullbrook, Cecil Hardy
- 1972 Peter Powditch Robert Grieve
- 1975 Ivan Durrant (not in ref)
- 1976 Alan Oldfield
- 1977 Ivan Durrant
- 1982 Micky Allan
- 1988 Ron Radford
