= Melbourne Advertiser =

First newspaper published in Melbourne, Australia

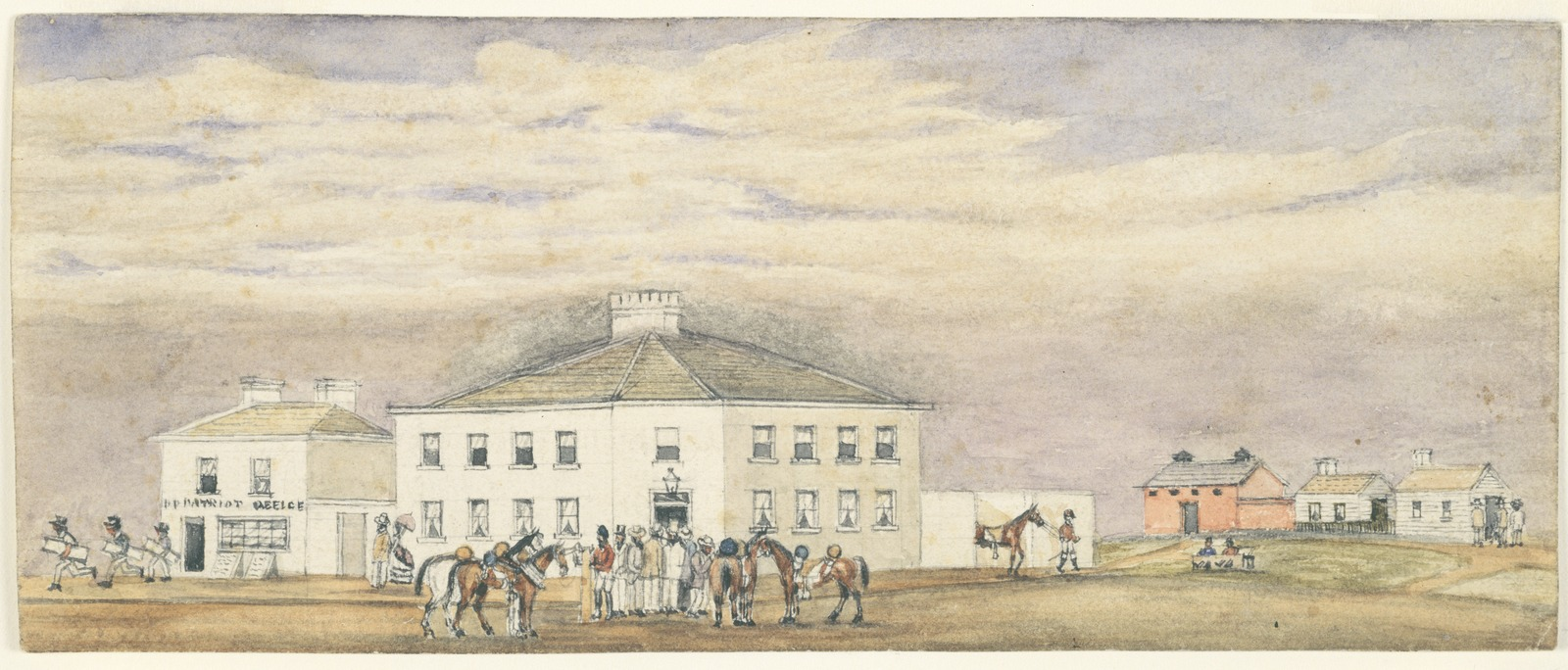
Headquarters of the Port Phillip Patriot and Melbourne Advertiser next to Fawker's former hotel (c. 1846-1848) from State Library Victoria pictures collection.

The Melbourne Advertiser was the first newspaper published in Melbourne, in what was then known as Port Phillip District, and now is Victoria, Australia. It was published by John Pascoe Fawkner, a co-founder of Melbourne. The first edition appeared on 1 January 1838, handwritten in ink by Fawkner himself and displayed at his hotel.

Ten hand-written weekly editions were published before Fawkner acquired a wooden press and some metal fount from Launceston. The Advertiser was initially printed in a shed at the rear of Fawkner's hotel. It sold for a shilling but could be read for free at his hotel. After printing a further seventeen issues he was forced by law to cease publication because he had failed to register the newspaper. On 6 February 1839, he registered and renamed the newspaper as Port Phillip Patriot and Melbourne Advertiser. William Kerr (1812–1859) left the Port Phillip Herald in 1841 to be editor of the newspaper; he continued as editor for about ten years before becoming editor of a rival newspaper, the Times. The newspaper became the first newspaper to achieve daily publication in Melbourne on 15 May 1845.

The paper was renamed The Melbourne Daily News and Port Phillip Patriot on 9 October 1848 and then simply The Melbourne Daily News from November 1848 to 30 June 1851.

The original printing press still exists and is stored at the Scienceworks Museum in Melbourne.

Images and transcripts of 16 issues of the Melbourne Advertiser (1838) are available freely online, via the State Library of Victoria. Most issues published during 1839–1845 are available freely online, via Trove. Issues published during 1845–1848, when it was known as the Port Phillip Patriot and Morning Advertiser, are also available freely online, via Trove.

Issues of The Melbourne Daily News and Port Phillip Patriot are available freely online, via Trove, an Australian online library database. Issues of The Melbourne Daily News are also available freely online, via Trove.
