= Stephanie Taylor (Australian artist) =

Stephanie Taylor (1899–1974) was an Australian artist, printmaker, gallerist, lecturer and art writer and broadcaster. She attained a wide audience in the later 1930s when the Australian Broadcasting Commission featured her art programs on radio stations in Sydney and Canberra as well as her hometown of Melbourne.

== Early career ==
Taylor was the daughter of colonial artist, Elizabeth Ball, who had studied at the National Gallery School in the 1860s, was elected as an associate of the Victorian Academy of Arts in 1879 and exhibited with that group. Elizabeth Ball married Captain Charles Taylor and settled in Williamstown where Taylor and her three siblings were born.

Taylor studied with sculptor Charles Douglas Richardson, who became a lifelong friend and whose memorial exhibition she organised in 1933. She also studied at the National Gallery of Victoria School from 1914 to 1922. After leaving the school she shared a studio in Collins Street with fellow Gallery student Dorothy Moore. She showed with the Melbourne Society of Women Painters and Sculptors in the 1920s.

Taylor was a competent etcher in the English painter-etcher tradition and a watercolourist. Her greatest impression on her contemporaries was, however, as a lecturer, broadcaster and gallerist, as an incipient iteration of the later curatorial profession. She also published art criticism in the 1930s with the Melbourne journal Adam and Eve.

== Cultural impact as an art lecturer ==
Taylor was best known as a lecturer on the history of art in Melbourne and presented lectures during the 1930s at the National Gallery of Victoria. Although she was opposed to modernism, she supported the Gallery's purchasing of expensive European masterworks. She presented exhibition reviews and lectures on art for ABC radio as early as the 1920s as well as teaching a course in the history of Australian Art at the Emily McPherson College and also in 1934 an art history course for the University of Melbourne. The Sydney Morning Herald claimed that ‘hundreds of art lovers’ had enjoyed her lectures and noted that the Athenaeum Club had made a list of outstanding public lectures delivered in Melbourne and that Taylor had been selected for this honour alongside major scholars from the University of Melbourne of that era, Professors Osborne and Crawford and Sir Ernest Fiske. Perhaps her greatest impact on Australian cultural life was her active lobbying for the establishment of a School of Art History at the University of Melbourne in the 1930s. Her suggestion that the University should teach historical and theoretical matters around art predates the establishment of the Herald Chair of Fine Arts by nearly a decade.

== Feminist art advocacy ==
Unlike many women artists in Australia prior to the 1970s with the exception of Portia Geach, Taylor made many pro-feminist public statements, particularly in relation to equal representation and visibility of artists in the Australian art market. In 1940 she led a deputation to the Chief secretary of Victoria complaining that the director of the National Gallery of Victoria, James Stuart MacDonald was opposed to women artists. "Most of the few examples of work by women artists are kept in basements and storerooms that are not accessible to the public," she said. "It is rare for a piece by a woman to be purchased for the collection." In 1929 she criticised Arthur Streeton for mentioning only one woman artist in an article outlining the history of Australian art. She stated that works by ‘70 or 80’ Australian women artists had been bought by public galleries across the country and listed a group of Australian women who had received major awards and honours overseas. In 1939 she wrote to the editor of the Age "I still maintain that there is a popular prejudice against women in the fine arts."

== Later career ==
During the 1940s she was no longer employed by the National Gallery of Victoria but managed the Velasquez Gallery in Tye's store, 100 Bourke St., Melbourne. She also offered her services as an art conservator. In 1949, she was described as "one of Melbourne's best known woman painters"

She held a number of solo exhibitions in Melbourne as well as exhibiting with groups such as the Melbourne Society of Women Painters and Sculptors

- 1926 Athenaeum Gallery (with Mabel Pye) — oils and watercolours
- 1934 Everyman's Gallery Melbourne — oils, watercolours and fan designs
- 1939 Centenary Club Melbourne
- 1946 Velasquez Gallery Melbourne
- 1949 Tye's Velasquez Gallery Melbourne — watercolours

In 1953 after a lengthy period of hospitalisation, she married Harold Green.
