= Desmond Fennessy =

Australian journalist (1916–2007)

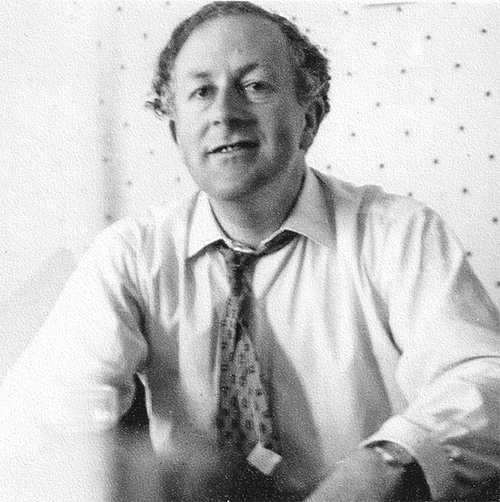
Desmond Fennessy, at age 41, in London, 1957

Desmond James Fennessy (21 May 1916 – 4 August 2007) was an Australian journalist and magazine editor, and Australian Trade Commissioner in Seoul.

== Early life ==
Desmond Fennessy was born 21 May 1916 in Malvern to Lillian Kathleen (née Keiran) and James Joseph Fennessy, postal assistant, and was the elder brother of Nancy, Joan and James. The family lived at 10 Florence Ave., Kew and was Catholic. He attended Xavier College where in 1931 he received awards for essay writing. His father died in 1933 at only 47 years of age and when Desmond was seventeen.

== Journalist ==
At 23 Fennessy was writing humour for Bohemia magazine, and for The Argus in 1939 he penned an omnivorous response to their request for lists of guests for the ‘perfect’ dinner party, nominating for "a good party and not merely a bleak gathering of the leading figures from Who's Who;" A. P. Herbert, English humourist, author and politician, "because his jovial quips would put the other guests In a happy mood, and because he Is the only politician who can be relied upon not to bore his listeners;" Salvador Dalí, in order to know more about Surrealism; Sam Goldwyn "because I want to know if his name really is Sam Goldfish, and if he is as illiterate as his critics allege;" Peter Fleming, for his stories of strange lands and peoples; Orson Welles; critic Hannen Swaffer to discover whether he was "as eccentric as he is supposed to be;" "Believe-It-Or-Not" Ripley to "tell him of a few strange oddities I have discovered off my own bat;" Osbert Sitwell; French journalist Magda de Fontages [sic] so that she "may be able to sell her story to Sam Goldwyn;" and Eddie Cantor for his funny face.

== War service ==
Before WWII he lived at 6 Tara Avenue, Kew and was a correspondent for the London Dancing Times, He enlisted in 1939 in the 2nd Australian Imperial Force and served in the Pacific, during which time he wrote for Salt, the Army Education Journal, and for the Australian War Memorial's As You Were. He remained living in Kew after his brief marriage in 1943 to Melbourne-born artist, later curator and independent art dealer, Alannah Coleman.

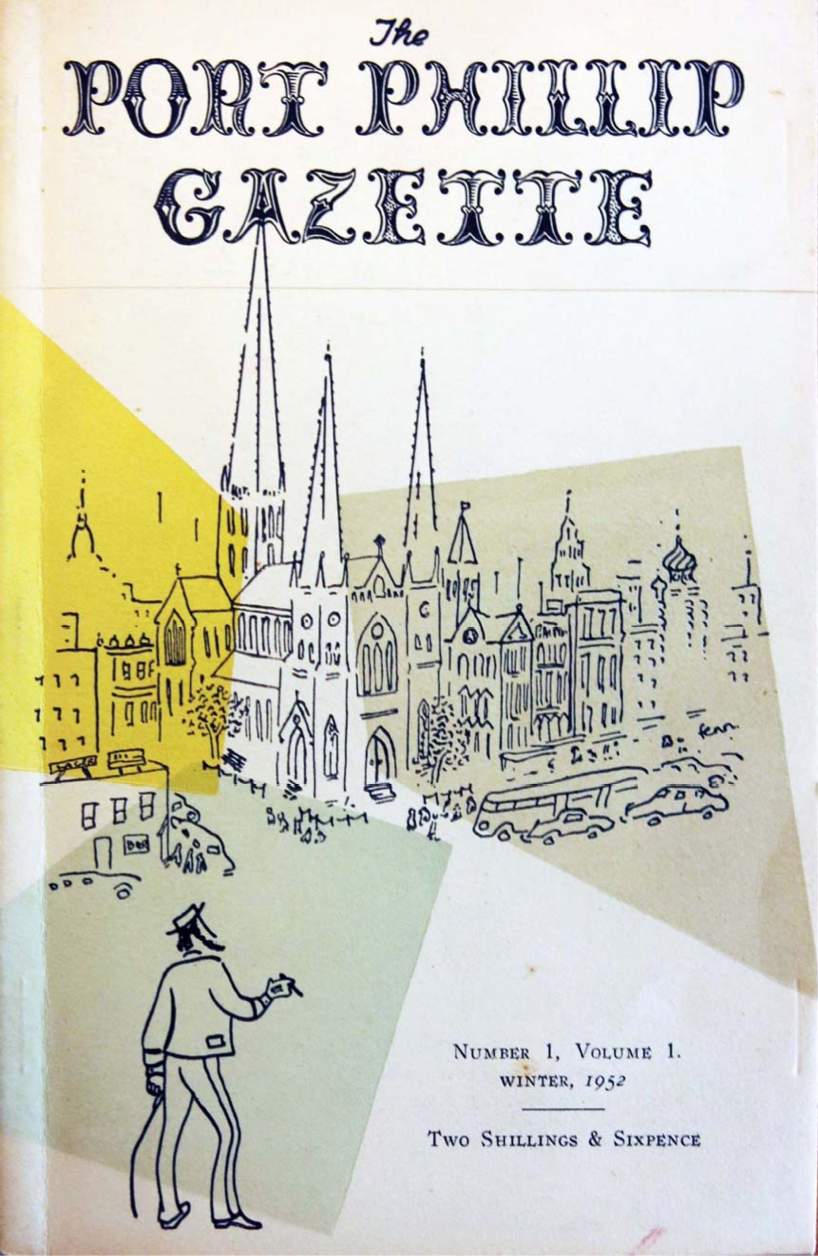
The Port Phillip Gazette Vol. 1, Number 1, illustration by Desmond's sister Joan.

== The Port Phillip Gazette ==
Following their divorce Fennessy founded and edited The Port Phillip Gazette, published by Rising Sun Press, which from 1952 to 1956 irregularly issued seven 64-page numbers offering short stories, essays, humour, and critical reviews of paintings, plays, books and films. Tim Burstall mentions in early 1954 that Fennessy ‘was proud of it in a quiet sort of way.'

== Overseas engagements ==
Following the demise of the Gazette, Fennessy moved to London in 1957, working briefly in Fleet Street and as correspondent to Australian newspapers. In June 1957, he wrote lamenting that Albert Tucker was not better known in his own country as he considered the artist's work original. Later in 1957 he relocated to Ghana after its independence and worked as editorial adviser its Ashanti Times, with plans to make it a weekly news magazine like the London Observer, and to increase its pages to carry more features and illustrations.

== 1960 return to Australia ==
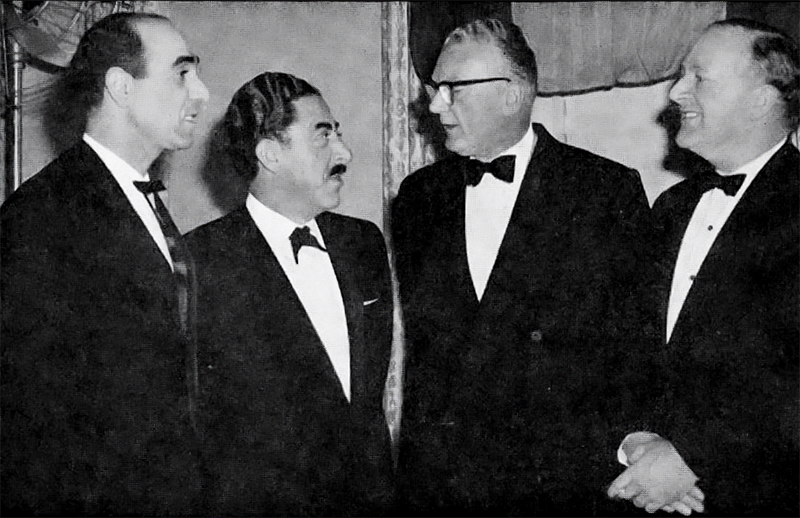
Cover of Overseas Trading showing (L-R) Rudolph Aboukhater, a correspondent in Australia for the Beirut Press; Dr. Karim Azkoul Consul-General in Australia for the Lebanon; Mr. Le Marchand and Desmond Fennessy, editor of Overseas Trading.

Returning to Australia in mid-1960 Fennessy, interviewed for The Age reflected on his three years in Ghana and "on trouble-free multi-racing living" compared to South Africa; he reported that "There is no apartheid at all in Ghana. The races mix on a basis of complete equality. The Ghanaians are a friendly fun-loving, hospitable people. They have absolutely no anti-white feeling."

At first he freelanced, writing fondly in Walkabout magazine as "a native son returned recently from abroad," of the city of Melbourne;

"a maiden lady in bonnet and lace-up boots, it has been bleakly remarked, and there is a spark of truth in this assertion. At first meeting Melbourne has indeed all the prim and chilling charm of a provincial English governess. But those who cherish her know that she reserves her charms, modest lady that she is, for those who love her well. Only a true Melburnian can fully appreciate those charms. And one does not become a true Melburnian until, strolling at dusk past Scots Church towards the top of Collins Street one feels the deep and calm serenity of being quite at peace with the world."

Soon Fennessy secured a position in July 1961 as editor of Overseas Trading. He married Betty Alieen Godfrey of New Norfolk, Tasmania, who had worked with him on the Gazette, on 15 July 1967 at the Wesley Church in Melbourne, and the couple moved to 33 Hopkins St, Weston in Canberra in the Australian Capital Territory.

== Trade commissioner ==
Fennessy served as assistant trade commissioner (publicity) in Singapore, in Kuala Lumpur and Singapore again. Subsequently he was appointed 1972–76 as the Australian Trade Commissioner to Korea, based in Seoul in a newly created full post; originally it had been in the remit of the trade commissioner in Tokyo who in 1969 had made it a subpost staffed by a marketing officer. Fennessy was selected for his military record, and his journalism in Melbourne and London, including as editor of Overseas Trading and of a number of foreign press journals.

When he took up the role, Australia was boosting its exports to Korea after the latter's rapid industrialisation. He oversaw an increase from A$8 million in 1966/7 to A$36 million during 1971/72, which after Fennessy had retired increased sevenfold to A$266 million in 1977/78 with higher numbers of business visitors, accelerated by coal and iron ore sales, despite perceptions that Korea was a culturally and commercially ‘difficult,’ though increasingly major, market.

== Later life ==
The couple remained in Canberra until about 1980 before returning to live in Melbourne. Fennessy died on 4 August 2007 aged 91, survived by his wife Betty and daughter Lakshmi, and is buried at Melbourne General Cemetery, Carlton North.
