= L. Scott Pendlebury =

Australian artist (1914–1986)

- Born: Laurence Scott Pendlebury; 21 April 1914; Melbourne, Victoria, Australia
- Died: May 1986 (aged 72)
- Education: National Gallery of Victoria Art School
- Notable work: The Chicory Kiln, Phillip Island, Constitution Dock, Hobart, Old Farmhouse, Road to Whistlewood
- Spouse: Eleanor Constance "Nornie" Gude (m. 1943)
- Family: Anne Scott-Pendlebury (daughter) (born 1946), Andrew Pendlebury (son; (born 1952)
- Awards: Dunlop Art Contest (1953); Wynne Prize (1956, 1957, 1960, 1968)

L. Scott Pendlebury or Laurence Scott Pendlebury (21 April 1914 – May 1986) was an Australian landscape and portrait artist and teacher. He married fellow artist Eleanor Constance "Nornie" Gude (8 December 1915 – 24 January 2002) in January 1943 and they were the parents of Anne Lorraine Pendlebury (born 21 August 1946), a stage, film and TV actress; and Andrew Scott Pendlebury (born 1952) a guitarist-songwriter.

Pendlebury won the Wynne Prize four times for his landscape paintings with The Chicory Kiln, Phillip Island (1956), Constitution Dock, Hobart (1957), Old Farmhouse (1960, shared with John Perceval's Dairy Farm, Victoria) and Road to Whistlewood (1968). He was a finalist in the Archibald Prize twenty-four times, including Nornie Gude (Artist) (1944) and Anne and Drew Pendlebury (actress and musician respectively) (1979). His work was presented in the state galleries of New South Wales, Queensland, South Australia, Tasmania and Victoria. Pendlebury worked at Swinburne Technical College as an instructor from 1946 to 1963 and then as head of the art school until his retirement in 1974. He died in May 1986, aged 72.

== Biography ==
Pendlebury was born on 21 April 1914 in Melbourne. His father was Thomas Pendlebury (1873 – 20 October 1945), who worked at the Government Printing Office, and his mother was Jessie (died 25 January 1935); his older siblings were Thelma, Kath, Lyla/Leila and Thomas junior. Pendlebury attended the National Gallery of Victoria Art School from 1932 to 1938. While there, in 1936, he met fellow artist, Eleanor Constance "Nornie" Gude (8 December 1915 – 24 January 2002), daughter of Ballarat-based music teacher and orchestra conductor, Walter Gude. On 28 January 1943 Pendlebury and Gude married.

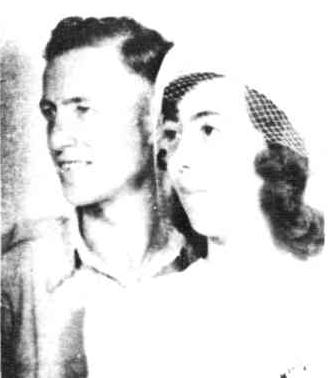
Pendlebury and Gude on their wedding day, Australasian, published on 6 March 1943

During World War II, on 26 April 1945, Pendlebury enlisted in the Australian Army and was discharged as a Sergeant on 21 December that year. Pendlebury and Gude's children are Anne Lorraine Pendlebury (born 21 August 1946), who became a stage, film and TV actress; and Andrew Scott Pendlebury (born 1952) a guitarist-songwriter.

In May 1953 Pendlebury won the Dunlop Art Contest, with a first prize of A£300, ahead of Arthur Boyd, for his oil painting, Late Afternoon – Rhyll. It was Pendlebury's fourth award in the competition, he finished third in 1952, fourth in 1951, and fourth previously in 1950 – the competition's inaugural year. The contest was sponsored by the Dunlop Rubber Company of Australia (later became Ansell) and aimed to "foster contemporary Australian art on aesthetic merits alone". One of the 1953 judges, Arnold Shore, reported in The Argus, that Pendlebury's work was a "sober, well-considered landscape" and it won against about 900 entries from throughout Australia. When exhibited in Adelaide, The Advertiser's Elizabeth Young preferred the watercolour entrants and felt Late Afternoon – Rhyll "completely lacks subtlety and with a slick harshness apes to a certain extent the contemporary approach, while having nothing of its essential spirit".

Pendlebury has won the Wynne Prize for a landscape painting, four times: The chicory kiln, Phillip Island (1956), Constitution Dock, Hobart (1957), Old farmhouse (1960, tied with John Perceval's Dairy Farm, Victoria), and Road to Whistlewood (1968). He qualified as a finalist, twenty-four times, in the Archibald Prize by painting portraits of notable Australians, including related subjects: Nornie Gude (Artist) (1944), Walter Gude (1945), Nornie Gude (1949), Self Portrait (1951), Nornie Gude (1959), Anne as "Irena" in the Three Sisters (1968), Nornie Gude (1978), and Anne and Drew Pendlebury (actress and musician respectively) (1979).

His art work was presented in the state galleries of New South Wales, Queensland, South Australia, Tasmania and Victoria. Pendlebury worked at Swinburne Technical College as an instructor from 1946 to 1963 and then as head of the art school until his retirement in 1974. Pendlebury died in May 1986, aged 72.

== Art prizes ==
Archibald Prize – Finalist
1944 Nornie Gude (Artist) – His wife
1945 Walter Gude – His father-in-law
1946 Professor W. A. Osborne – Professor of physiology (Dean of Faculty of Medicine, University of Melbourne), man of letters and broadcaster
1947 Harold Beck –
1948 S.B. Robertson, Esq. –
1949 Nornie Gude – His wife
1950 Dr. Paul Ehrenfeld –
1951 Self Portrait – Himself
1952 A. T. S. Sissons –
1953 Miss M. Stuart –
1954 Nigel Manning, BSc –
1956 Brett Randall –

Archibald Prize – Finalist
1957 Dr. Byron Stanton –
1958 Dr. Cyril Tonkin –
1959 Nornie Gude – His wife Gude entered the portrait, Scott Pendlebury
1960 Dr. Kel Semmens –
1961 Andor Meszaros, Sculptor –
1962 Best Overend, A.R.I.V.A., F.R.A.I.A., M.A.P.I., R.V.I.A. –
1968 Anne as "Irena" in the Three Sisters – His daughter
1973 Max Jost –
1974 Starless and Bible Black –
1978 Nornie Gude – His wife
1979 Anne and Drew Pendlebury (actress and musician respectively) – His two children
1980 His Honor Judge Lazarus –

Dunlop Art Contest
1950 . – Fourth
1951 . – Fourth
1952 . – Third
1953 Late Afternoon – Rhyll – First
1954
1955

Wynne Prize
1950 The Cyprus Tree – Finalist
1951 Hawthorn Quarry – Finalist
1953 The Opera House – Finalist
1954 Chicory Kiln, Phillip Island – Finalist
1956 The Chicory Kiln, Phillip Island – Winner
1956 A Street in Kew – Finalist
1957 Constitution Dock, Hobart – Winner
1959 Street Scene, Melbourne – Finalist

Wynne Prize
1960 Old Farmhouse – Winner: Trustees' Watercolour
1961 Autumn Light – Finalist
1962 Australian Landscape 1962 – Finalist
1968 Road to Whistlewood – Winner
1969 Across the Mulgas – Finalist
1970 The Founder's Vision – Finalist
1972 Quarry at Tullamarine – Finalist
