= Port Phillip Gazette =

Former newspaper of Victoria, Australia

There were two Australian periodicals called The Port Phillip Gazette.

The first was the second newspaper published in Melbourne, in the then Port Phillip District and what is now Victoria, Australia. It was first published by Thomas Strode and George Arden in 1838.

The title was revived for an otherwise unrelated Melbourne literary magazine 1952-56.

== The original Gazette ==
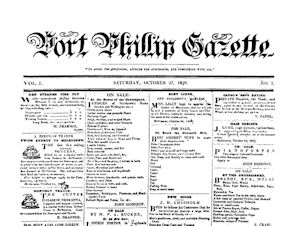
Cover page of the first issue of the Port Phillip Gazette, a four-page weekly, 27 October 1838

The first issue of the Port Phillip Gazette, a four-page weekly, appeared on 27 October 1838. From 1 January 1840, until its discontinuation in that formation 1841, it was published bi-weekly. From August 1845 to Dec. 1850 it was published as a daily newspaper the Port Phillip Gazette and Settler's Journal.

Writer George Arden, second son of Major Samuel Arden, of the East India Company, passed through Melbourne in 1838 as he emigrated to Sydney as an eighteen-year-old. He returned in October that year with printer Thomas Strode, and they launched the Port Phillip Gazette, proclaiming an aim to "assist the enquiring, animate the struggling, and sympathise with all." They also published the first poem and the first book to be printed in Melbourne. The Gazette was increased in size and it appeared semi-weekly. From May–June 1842 Augustus Greeves edited the Port Phillip Gazette while Arden was absent but next year retired from the staff and entered politics, becoming mayor in 1849. Though Arden was a competent writer, his youth and indiscretion led him to criticise the administration of Melbourne's first police magistrate William Lonsdale and resulted in conflict with Judge John Walpole Willis for which he was defendant in the first civil libel case in the colony; George Cavanagh, editor of the Port Phillip Herald, offered surety for Arden when Willis sent him to gaol. Arden subsequently lost the Gazette to his creditors in November 1842 and died on the goldfields of Ballarat in 1854.

The Gazette was next edited and published by the Scottish-born Thomas McCombie, who became editor and part proprietor in 1844 and until 1851 when his political interests had come to dominate. The newspaper became a daily as the Times in about March 1851, with William Kerr as editor. Kerr had previously been editor of the Port Phillip Herald (1840–41) and the Port Phillip Patriot and Melbourne Advertiser (1841–51) newspapers. The Times ceased publication on 30 June 1851.

The Gazette's journalists included Irishman Henry Frencham who had arrived in Melbourne in 1840. In June 1851 he wrote about having discovered gold in the Plenty Ranges, though his specimens contained none. He left the Gazette in November that year to go prospecting in Ballarat, Castlemaine (then called Forest Creek), and Bendigo. Discharged convict John Davies also wrote for the paper in 1842-3, and despite Judge Willis' harsh treatment of Arden, commended him; "We like him the better that he has never administered one kind of justice to the rich and another kind to the poor." The Presbyterian clergyman James Forbes expressed his views on politics and education in the paper before starting his own Port Phillip Christian Herald. George Henry Haydon contributed illustrations during Kerr's editorship.

The Gazette introduced copperplate printing to Victoria in 1839. The introduction of lithography in Victoria in 1840 is also attributed to the Gazette.

== 1952 revival ==
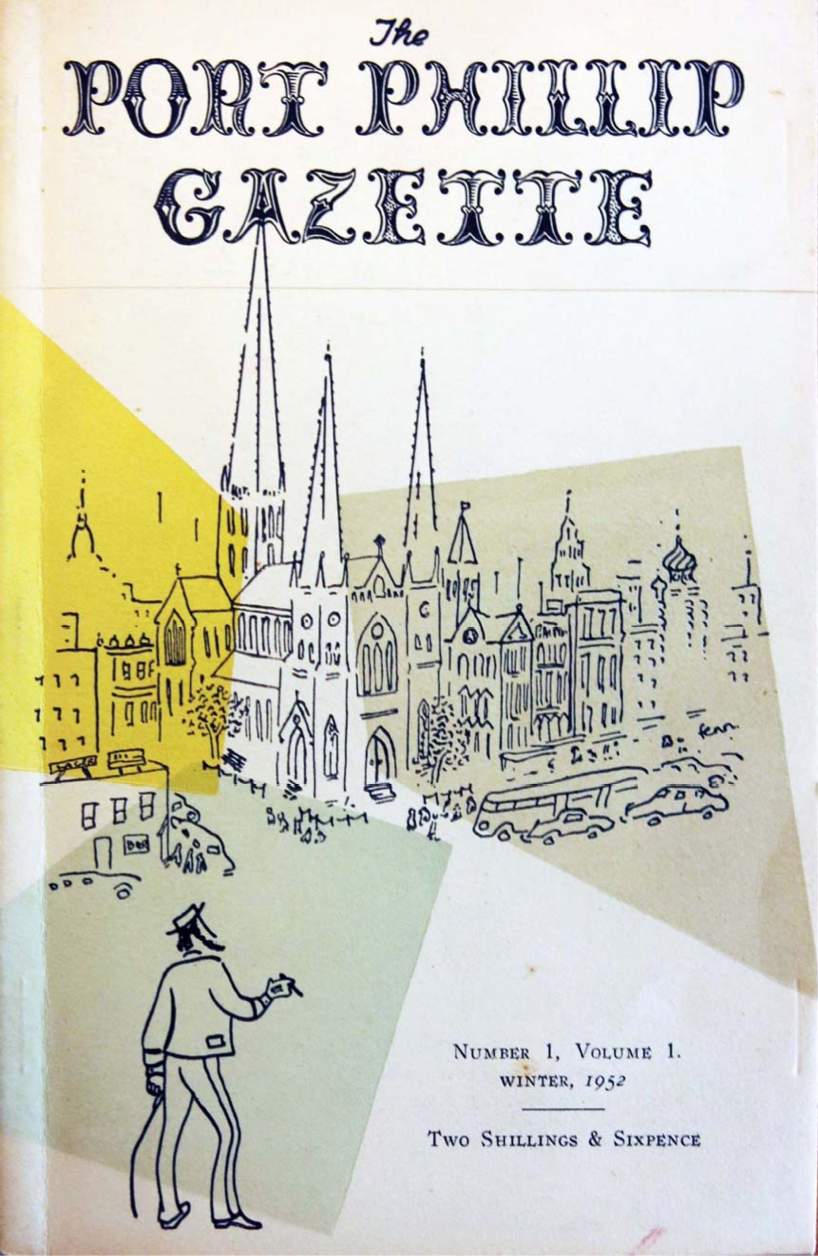
Cover of The Port Phillip Gazette Vol. 1, Number 1, with image by Joan Fennessy

The title Port Phillip Gazette, deliberately archaic and with a correspondingly vintage copperplate-style masthead, was revived for a literary quarterly in 1952. However, the editorial of the inaugural issue is at odds with the connection to the original publication so named;

"We decided finally on Port Phillip Gazette because we rather like our irascible old predecessor, John Pascoe Fawkner, who first published his cantankerous sheet, The Port Phillip Patriot, in 1839. It seems to us an unpretentious title with no nonsense about it, and it proclaims unequivocally our origin and milieu."

Nevertheless, a lineage can be traced through William Kerr (above) from Fawkner.

Edited at 192 Canterbury Rd., Canterbury, by Desmond Fennessy a journalist who was writing in 1939 for the literary magazine Bohemia, it was published by Rising Sun Press, and came out in seven 64-page issues over 1952-6;

Volume 1:

- No. 1 Winter 1952
- No. 2 Summer 1952-3
- No. 3 Autumn 1953
- No. 4 Spring 1953

Volume 2:

- No. 1 Autumn 1954
- No. 2 Summer 1955
- No. 3 Autumn 1956

The cover price was 2/6d, equivalent to a value of A$4.85 in 2021, and an annual subscription of 11 shillings (equal to about A$20 in 2021).

The contents were printed in 10pt. Ronaldson typeface. Its illustrations throughout were drawn in pen, with spot colour for the cover, by Fennessy's sister Joan. Each cover included the signature figure of John Batman, reputed founder of Melbourne, like the appearances of Eustace Tilley on anniversary covers of a magazine to whose style they aspired; The New Yorker, and like that magazine of that era it eschewed photographs. Tim Burstall mentions in early 1954 that Fennessy ‘was proud of it in a quiet sort of way.’ The editor promoted as policy that; 'We do not intend to publish the sort of stuff that we think you want to read. We will publish what we want to read ourselves and can't find elsewhere. If it is not what you want to read too, that's too bad and we can't be worried."

=== Reception ===
The new magazine attracted positive attention, though with some conservative detractors. Its style was described in the Melbourne Age in 1954 as "a sensible, sophisticated tone, still a trifle imitative of the New Yorker but with an accent that is unmistakably Australian," while The Sun recommended it as "sleekly modern in its style, which is modelled without apology on that of The New Yorker's notes of metropolitan life The writing is amusing, provoking, intelligent and at times almost brilliant. The magazine adopts no pretentious poses, grinds no political axes, and is unselfconciously Australian in its flavor. There are some refreshing sections of literary, art; theatrical and film criticism."

=== Content ===
Asserting the magazine's independence, the inaugural editorial declared In addition to reviews of theatrical and arts events, articles, poetry and short stories were also accepted. Contributors included Fennessy himself, H. A. Lindsay, Allan Dawes, Niall Brennan, David Martin, James W. Kern, Gordon Gow, Vincent Buckley, and Barry Humphries who among several articles included text of his first performance as Edna Everage.

The fourth issue contained a short story by David Martin, an article by Gordon Gow on television in the United Kingdom (before it had been introduced in Australia), a Vincent Buckley critique of some Bulletin poets, some notes on America under the heading "Behind the Cellophane Curtain," by Neil Clerehan, "Capital Punishment", dealing with affairs in Canberra, particularly the Senator Kennelly incident in the Labor party, and the supposedly dark sources of some A.L.P. funds and telephone "tapping," alongside reviews of books, films, plays and art exhibitions.

Australian poet Kenneth Slessor provides an insight into the contents of Vol. 2, No. 1:

"It is gratifying to find that this ominously intelligent little Australian quarterly, with its occasional reminder of The New Yorker (which it resembles on the scale of a Peruvian shrunken head), has survived its first year, a period during which most of its kind in Australia generally expire. The current issue, on the contrary, is very much alive, with short stories, humor, critical reviews of paintings, plays, books and films, and a ferocious attack on contemporary values in Australian poetry."

The magazine offered contributors a fair rate at a time when other such publications were expecting them gratis, or at 10/6 per 1000 words. J. P. (Jack) McKinney served his apprenticeship in journalism on the Gazette, and later worked on the Melbourne Herald, subsequently freelanced for the next 35 years

=== Demise ===
After failing to raise subscriptions for a monthly publication the seventh, and last, number of the Port Phillip Gazette quarterly was that of Autumn 1956. Editor Fennessy left for the UK and in 1957 was working in Fleet Street, before moving on to edit the Ashanti Times in Uganda until 1960, and then Overseas Trading, before becoming a trade commissioner for Australia in Korea.
