= Tony Underhill =

Anthony Barton (Tony) Underhill was an Australian artist born in Sydney in 1923.

== Army career ==
Underhill joined the Australian Army in 1941. During this time he met William Dobell who taught him art and he completed his training with Dobell at the Sydney Technical College from 1945-46. He was a semi-official War Artist in New Guinea and North Australia from 1942-43.

== Artistry career ==
He had his first solo show in Melbourne in 1947, then moved to England the following year. He taught at Hornsey and Guildford Colleges of Art and became head of post-graduate painting at Birmingham Polytechnic. His works are held by the Art Gallery of New South Wales.

== Death ==
Underhill died in London on 24 May 1977.

== Oral history ==
Underhill was interviewed in 1965 by Hal Missingham about his life and career as an artist. The recording can be found at the National Library of Australia.
