= Velasquez Gallery =

Art museum in Melbourne

Coordinates: 37.812177°S 144.970209°E

Velasquez Gallery, also known as Velasquez Gallery at Tye's, and later Tye's Art Gallery, was a Melbourne art gallery that showed contemporary traditional, and later, modernist Australian art, including some sculpture and prints, as well as Australian indigenous art. It operated from 1940 to 1955.

== History ==
The Velasquez Gallery, located in the basement at the rear of Tye's Furniture Building, 100 Bourke Street, Melbourne, was one of the few places to exhibit in 1940s Melbourne. The gallery opened during WW2 on 4 June 1940 with an exhibition of work by Australian proponent of Tonalism, Max Meldrum, and "autumn leaves from Mr. Tye's Macedon garden decorated the gallery". When it first opened in June 1940, The Age described its facilities;

The Velasquez Gallery an interesting development in the progress of art in Melbourne is the establishment of a new gallery — to be known as the Velasquez Gallery— by Tye and Co., at their Bourke-street premises. The gallery, which is 50 feet square, is artificially lighted on a carefully considered plan, which allows for adjustments and modifications, and will ensure a uniform and even glow, such as cannot be got by a daylight arrangement. The general setting of the gallery is adequate, and pictures will be seen under the best possible conditions. The gallery will open with a one-man exhibition by Max Meldrum on June 4.

The business later expanded to 110-116 Bourke Street.

== Ethos ==
The manager was painter/printmaker, critic, broadcaster and lecturer Stephanie Taylor (1899–1974), and director, the art collector and connoisseur George Page-Cooper (c.1895-1967). The gallery showed contemporary traditional, and later, Modern Australian art, including some sculpture and prints, as well as indigenous art. In 1948, twenty-seven of Sidney Nolan's Kelly series paintings were shown at the Velasquez Gallery for the first time. Under the management of Taylor, women artists were given much better exposure than at other galleries, and she organised a number of shows to raise funds for charities. A September 1943 report in The Bulletin demonstrates its optimistic openness to Modernism;

Art shows of various groups and the crowds they draw give abundant evidence that war hasn’t yet squelched our aesthetic senses. Norman MacGeorge, expatiating on surrealism and symbolism and such developments, drew a surprisingly large audience to the Velasquez Galleries. He took his examples from the Contemporary Art Group’s show.

== Closure ==
Page-Cooper moved on in 1952 with the unrealised intention to set up another gallery in the city before Velasquez Gallery closed early 1955. Taylor wrote to The Age newspaper:

...the passing of Tye's Art Gallery will be regretted by many art lovers who will remember some of the fine exhibitions that were held there. It Is a pity that there are not a few more public-spirited people like the late Mr. Tye, who are willing to sacrifice a little of their profits for the cultural development of the city which gives them a living.

Page-Cooper's collection, which included significant works by S. T. Gill, William Dobell, Arthur Streeton, Hans Heysen, Charles Conder and Tom Roberts, was offered for sale by the Leonard Joel auction house after his death in 1967 with further works disposed by auction in 1995.

== Exhibitions ==
As 'Velasquez Gallery':

- 1940, 4–22 June Max Meldrum retrospective, opened by Vice-Chancellor of the University of Melbourne John Medley
- 1940, July 2: Children's Exhibition, 130 works from Australia, Britain, United States, Canada, Spain, Poland and other countries, opened by Daryl Lindsay and Lady Brookes, silver coin fundraiser for the Red Cross
- 1940, 7–21 August: Arnold Shore, landscapes and still life, opened by Russell Grimwade
- 1940, August: Frank R. Crozier, war paintings and landscapes in aid of A.I.F. 22nd Battalion Comforts Fund. Curated by Cecily Crozier (niece)
- 1940, 13 September: Noel Blaubaum, Melbourne and Hobart landscapes in monotypes and oils
- 1940, 30 September - October: Paintings by Miss A.M.E. Bale,
- 1940, 18–30 November: The Bread and Cheese Club's Australian Art & Literature Exhibition
- 1941: Exhibition of paintings sculpture and pottery by Australian artists to aid the Red Cross.
- 1941: 18 February – 3 March: Exhibition of clay sculptures on Australian Aboriginal folk-lore by William Ricketts: legends collected by Sir Baldwin Spencer, K.C.M.G., F.R.S. and David Uniapon
- 1941, 9 August – 30 August: Exhibition of paintings by Edith Holmes.
- 1943, from 16 June: Red Cross fundraising exhibition curated by Stephanie Taylor from works, including her own, by Rupert Bunny, Arthur Streeton, Max Meldrum, James Peter Quinn, Charles Wheeler, Hans Heysen, James R. Jackson, Robert Johnson, Raymond Wallis, Robert Campbell, L. Bernard Hall, William B. McInnes, Albert Ernest Newbury, Isabel May Tweddle, Violet McInnes, Dorothy Moore, and Douglas Thomas
- 1943, 16 – 27 July: Adrian George Feint
- 1943, 16 July – 27 July: Exhibition of the Graphic Arts
- 1943, from 15 August: Exhibition of bookbinding to aid the Red Cross
- 1943, 24 August – 3 September: Contemporary Art Society
- 1943, from 14 September: Gwen Barringer
- 1943–5, 16 November 1943 – 27 July 1945: Touring Exhibition of Graphic Arts
- 1944, from 4 April: paintings by Alannah Coleman and Joan Malcolm, opened by actor Claude Flemming
- 1944, 10 – 20 May: Stephanie Taylor, 43 watercolours and oils
- 1945: First annual exhibition, artists E. Alsop, Wallace Anderson, Clothilde Atyeo, A.M.E. Bale, E. Monette Baxter, Tom Bell, Josl Bergner, Arthur Boyd, Ian Bow, Lina Bryans, Nutter Buzacott, Victor E. Cobb, Valerie Cohen, Yvonne F. Cohen, W. Coleman, Elizabeth Colquhoun, F. Lawrence Coles, Noel Counihan, Sybil Craig, Peggy Crombie, Mabel Crump, Aileen Dent, Max Dimmack, Ailsa Donaldson, Ambrose Dyson, Esme Farmer, John Farmer, Alma Figuerola, Burton Fox, Madge Freeman, William Frater, Grace Gardiner, Ina Gregory, Nornie Gude, W.G. Gulliver, Michael Hall, John Heath, Edward Heffernan, Roy Opie, Betty Paterson, Esther Paterson, John Perceval, A. Plante, Muriel Pornett, James Quinn, M. Rankin, Jack Sampson, Dora Serle, Bruno Simon, David Sing, Colvin L. Smith, J.T. Smith, W. Spence, N.F. Suhr, Jean P. Sutherland, Jo Sweatman, E.W. Syme, Arnold Shore, Stephanie Taylor, George H. Tichauer, Louise Thomas, Violet Teague, Francis Roy Thompson, (Note: See New Gallery of Fine Art.) Rollo Thomson, Albert Tucker, Kit Turner, Danila Vassilieff, J. Wentcher, Tina Wentcher, James V. Wigley, Nora Wilkie, Dora L. Wilson, Noel Wood, Marjorie Woolcock, Joan Yonge, Marguerite Mahood.
- 1945, 24 April to 5 May: Exhibition of Aboriginal arts & crafts
- 1945, 5–16 June: Roger Kemp - first solo exhibition, 37 works
- 1945, 2–13 July: Contemporary Child Art to Aid Red Cross Funds, Arranged by Woman"s World, Exhibition opened by Lady Brookes at Velasquez Gallery, Tye's Building
- 1945, 1 March – 1 April: Exhibition of paintings by Ivan Yakovlev
- 1945, 3 – 13 April: Australian C.E.M.A. Victorian Division, Autumn Arts Festival. First Annual Exhibition.
- 1945, 16 – 23 May: Exhibition of works of art by well known Australian artists for the benefit of The Lord Mayor's Appeal (The Rt. Hon. Cr. Sir Thomas S. Nettlefold, K.B., O.B.E.,) for totally and permanently disabled service men and service women.
- 1945, 16 – 27 July: Exhibition of the Graphic Arts; Bread and Cheese Club, Australian Bookplate Club.
- 1946, 8 – 19 January: Three Tasmanian artists; Winifred Biggins, Eileen Brooker, Dorothy Stoner
- 1946, 12 – 23 March: Exhibition by Water Colour Group
- 1947, from 24 July: Sculpture by Arthur Fleischmann and Lyndon Dadswell, opened by Frank Thring
- 1947, September: John Middleton
- 1948, 1 May – 8 June: Edith Holmes
- 1948, April: The Kelly paintings of Sidney Nolan 1946-47
- 1948? 7–19 June: Elizabeth Durack paintings

By the late 1940s in publicity and in general references to it, the gallery is usually just 'Tye's Gallery’:

- 1948: Loan collection of paintings from Dr. and Mrs. T.J. Kiernan, Irish Legation, Canberra, A.C.T.
- 1948, October: Stephanie Taylor, 64 watercolours
- 1948, 26 October – 5 November: Loan exhibition of paintings of horses...to benefit Ada Mary A'Beckett Free Kindergarten, Fisherman's Bend.
- 1949, June: Dutch paintings
- 1949, from 13 September: paintings by official R.A.A.F. and War Memorial artists Eric Thake, Harold Freedman and Max Newton to mark Air Force week, opened by Air Marshal G. Jones
- 1949, September: Stephanie Taylor, watercolours and oils
- 1949, from 1 October: Leonard French
- 1950, from 1 February: British Council exhibition of prints and photographs
- 1950, from 7 February: Swiss poster design
- 1950, 23 May – 2 June Tenth anniversary 1940 - 1950
- 1950, from 13 November: Inaugural exhibition of the Fellowship of Australian Artists
- 1952, 11 March: Spencer Jackson Historical Australasian Art Collection, opened by Daryl Lindsay
- 1952 Photographs of Yugoslavia
- 1952, October: Children's Art Exhibition at Tye's Gallery, opened by Archbishop Mannix, included work by Germaine Greer in the Under-14 section
- 1954, 6 April – 23 April: Contemporary Art Society commemorative exhibition; 86 painters and sculptors including women artists Mirka Mora, Erica McGilchrist, Ethel Barnes and Elizabeth Vassilief
- 1954, 14 September – 25 September: Artists for Peace.
- 1954, 6–23 April: Contemporary Art Society Commemorative Exhibition
