= Nornie Gude =

Australian artist

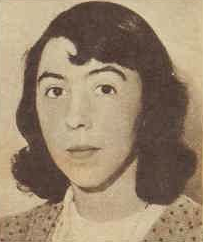
- Born: Eleanor Constance Gude; December 8, 1915; Ballarat, Victoria, Australia
- Died: January 24, 2002 (aged 86); Melbourne, Victoria, Australia
- Education: National Gallery School
- Known for: Painting
- Spouse: L. Scott Pendlebury

Eleanor Constance "Nornie" Gude (Dec 8 1915 – Jan 24 2002) was an Australian artist.

== Early life ==
Gude was born in 1915 in Ballarat, Victoria to Stella Rehfisch and Walter Gude, musician and violin teacher, and conductor of the St Patrick's Cathedral orchestra and choir in Ballarat. Her parents met when Stella was 27 and the 42-year old never-married Walter was teaching her the violin. Nornie and her sister Gilda were both raised in Ballarat before moving to Melbourne on the eve of World War II.

She was accepted into the Ballarat Technical Art School at 15 because of her advanced skill in painting, and trained there from 1931 to 1936. While there she was the Art Editor for The SMB, the magazine of the Ballarat School of Mines in 1934. She won the esteemed MacRobertson Scholarship in art worth £100 a year. She later went on to the National Gallery School from 1936 to 1939, studying with Sidney Nolan and Charles Bush, and became the first woman to win the National Gallery Students Travelling Scholarship.

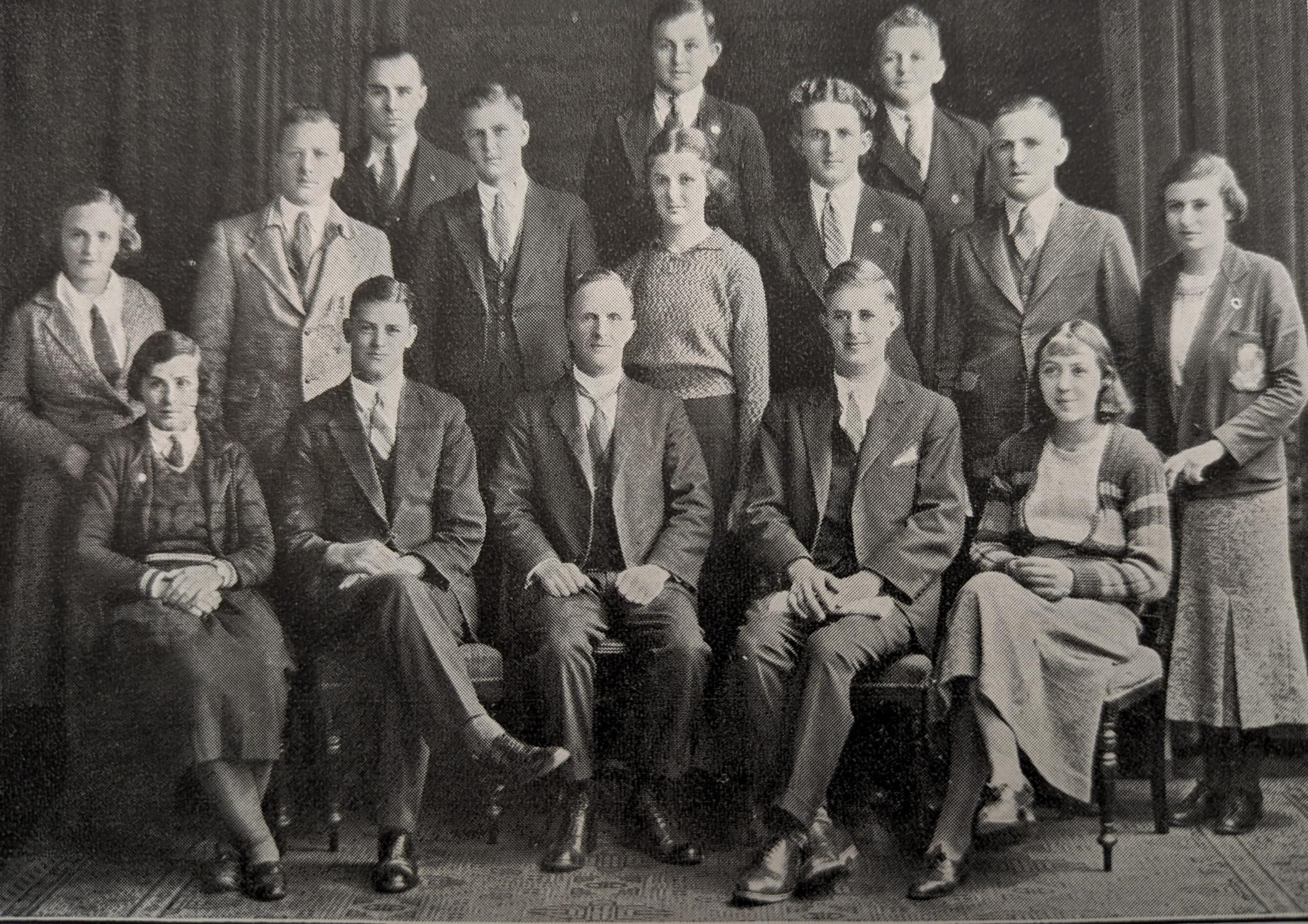
SMB magazine (School of Mines and Industries Ballarat) Editorial Committee, 1934 (Nornie Gude, Art Editor, seated front right)

== Career ==
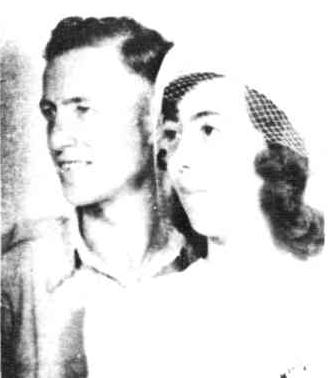
Nornie and her husband Laurence on their wedding day, Australasian, 6 March 1943

Gude won many awards for her painting both while at school and throughout her career. In 1958 she went on a study tour through England and Europe. Her works were described by Harold Herbert as "slick and clever." She exhibited with the Victorian Artists Society and the Australian Water Color Institute in Sydney. Leveson Street Gallery listed Gude amongst the artists it represented in a 1974 issue of The Bulletin. In 1988 she was a finalist for the 'Sail and Bicentenary award' at the ACTA Bicentenary Maritime Art Awards Exhibition with her work "'The Bounty' on Sydney Harbour."

Nornie met her husband, fellow painter Laurence Scott Pendlebury, while studying together at the Gallery School. They had two children, Anne and Andrew, both of whom followed artistic pursuits. The family lived in Caulfield, Nornie painting in her studio there.

She once said about art "You spend your first 20 years learning the technique and the next 20 years losing it." Her work is represented in collections at the National Gallery of Victoria, Parliament House, and the Art Gallery of Western Australia, as well as regional collections in Ballarat, Geelong, Castlemaine Art Museum, and Bendigo.

Gude died peacefully at home with her two children in Hawthorn on January 24, 2002.

== Awards ==
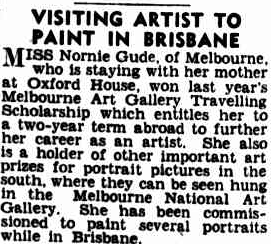
Visiting artist to paint in Brisbane, Courier-Mail, 23 May 1942

- 1941 - National Gallery School Landscape Prize
- 1948 - F. E. Richardson Prize (Geelong Art Gallery)
- 1951 - F. E. Richardson Prize
- 1953 - Perth Art Gallery Prize
- 1958 - Voss Smith Prize
- 1970 - Pring Prize
- 1988 - Doug Moran Naval Prize
- 1990 - Doug Moran National Portrait Prize

== Exhibitions ==
- 1954 - Artists for Peace exhibition, Tye's Gallery
- 1988 - 'Evespan' - Some Australian Women Artists 1920-1988, Albury Regional Art Centre
