= Mary Macqueen =

Australian artist (1912–1994)

Mary McCartney Macqueen (29 January 1912 – 15 September 1994) was an Australian artist who was known for her drawing, printmaking and mixed media works on paper. Her artistic style was expressive, gestural and experimental.

== Life, training and influences ==
Macqueen was born Mary McCartney Ballantine, elder daughter of Mr and Mrs A. D. Ballantine, in Carlton, Victoria, on 29 January 1912. Inspired by her grandmother's drawings, and encouraged by her parents, she developed a love for drawing from early childhood. Her primary and secondary schooling was at the Princes Hill State School, Mount Albert Central School and the Methodist Ladies College in Melbourne. She studied commercial art for one year in 1927 at the Swinburne Technical College, and took private drawing lessons with Catherine Hardess in 1928 at Hawthorn.

In 1930, at the age of eighteen, she married (Thomas) Allan Macqueen or McQueen, son of Rev. Finlay McQueen (died 18 November 1934), a widowed accountant and fruit exporter with two sons, Frederick and Allan. Over the ensuing ten years she did very little drawing and was instead occupied with raising those two and her own daughter and two sons, born between 1931 and 1935. In 1939 Macqueen resumed her drawing and also began to experiment with watercolour painting. In 1941 she returned to Swinburne Technical College to study with William Dargie for a term. Her subject matter during this period consisted of everyday domestic scenes at her home, and the buildings, landscapes and people of Melbourne. In March 1945 she held her first solo exhibition of watercolours at the Kozminsky Galleries in Melbourne. In 1946 she attended drawing sessions with George Bell, who spoke to her about Cubism, Georges Braque and Rauol Dufy. However, her intuitive drawing style was at odds with his highly structural approach and she ceased the lessons when her fourth child was born. Dorothy exhibited annually with the Victorian Artists Society, but faced the prevalent prejudice against those of her gender; of her contribution to its October 1950 Spring exhibition, critic Alan Warren was slighting: "Women painters, such as Violet Mclnnes, Dora Serle, Marjorie Woolcock, Dorothy Stephen, Roma Ward, Lesley Sinclair and Mary Macqueen have produced some competent pictures in their respective spheres."

Between 1956 and 1958 Macqueen attended printmaking classes at the Royal Melbourne Technical College, now RMIT University, where she developed a fascination for lithography. To be able to print at home, she converted an old hand mangle into a press, which she continued to use throughout her artistic career. As her printmaking skills and experience increased she was asked to teach for one day a week at RMIT. This was later expanded to include instructing students in free drawing techniques. She taught at RMIT for more than a decade.

In the 1960s, Macqueen began to focus on animals as the subject matter for her work. She often visited the Melbourne Zoo to draw animals from life and was particularly fond of drawing giraffes. After her husband died in September 1970 she embarked on several overseas trips, which included visits to England, Mexico, Kenya, Bangladesh, Canada and the United States. Works from her travels were presented at Leveson Street Gallery. These travel experiences contributed to the 1980s being described by Macqueen as "the decade which was to become the most interesting and productive in my life".

Mary Macqueen died at the age of 82 on 15 September 1994.

== Style and works ==
Macqueen's artistic style was typically spontaneous, expressive and gestural. She specialised in line drawing, lithography and mixed media works on paper. Her most successful line drawings efficiently distill the character and essential qualities of her subject matter, which included animals, landscapes and scenes of domestic life. Throughout her career she sought to draw the perfect line. Macqueen believed that "a good pure-line drawing takes every ounce of concentration and effort and is a rare achievement".

In the 1970s, the discovery of handmade Nepalese paper in a Buddhist shop was a crucial moment for Macqueen, as it allowed her to explore drawing on the reverse of the paper to create soft translucent colours and delicate tonal washes. A 1988 exhibition of paper works at the Powell Street Gallery, Melbourne consisted of ink, gouache and collage works on Nepalese paper, notably omitting her line drawings. Many of the works were based on scenes from countries she had visited, and they demonstrate the breadth of her experimentation with the medium. Her work in the exhibition shows influences of Cubism and Fauvism.

== Accomplishments ==
=== Awards ===
Macqueen was the recipient of numerous prizes, including

- Victorian College of the Arts Drawing prize, 1957
- May Day prize for drawing, 1958
- Mornington Peninsula Regional Gallery Portland prize, 1965
- Spring festival of Drawing (work acquired), 1973
- Ronald award, Latrobe Valley Arts Centre, 1973
- Maitland prize for prints, 1974
- F. E. Richardson prize (for watercolours), Geelong, 1976.

=== Selected solo exhibitions ===
The exact number of Macqueen's solo exhibitions is uncertain. Some sources cite "about 26" and others "just under 30"

- 1945 Kozminsky Galleries Melbourne
- 1948, 1950 Georges Gallery, Melbourne
- 1967, 1969, 1971, 1974 Crossley Gallery, Melbourne
- 1973, 1983, 1984, 1985, 1988 Powell Street Gallery, Melbourne
- 1976, 1978, 1980 Stuart Gerstmann Gallery, Melbourne
- 1975, 1977, 1979, 1981, 1982 Ray Hughes Gallery, Brisbane
- 1981, 1983, 1986 Tynte Gallery, Adelaide
- 1986, 1989, 1991, 1993 Charles Nodrum Gallery, Melbourne

=== Selected group exhibitions ===
- 1943 – 1957 Victorian Artists Society
- 1956 The Arts Festival, Olympic Games, Melbourne
- 1960 – 1964 Contemporary Art Society Annual Exhibitions
- 1963 Australian Print Survey, Travelling exhibition to all State Galleries
- 1966 Australian Prints Today, Smithsonian Institution, Washington D. C
- 1971 Contemporary Australian Prints, Auckland City Art Gallery
- 1975 Recent Drawings, National Gallery of Victoria
- 1977 Selection of 41 Modern Prints from Australia, Japan Print Association, Tokyo
- 1981 Spring Festival of Drawing, Mornington Peninsula Arts Centre
- 1982 The College Show, V.A.B. Regional Development program, travelling exhibition to East Coast Regional Galleries
- 1983 Australian Perspecta, Art Gallery of New South Wales
- 1984 The Australians, C.D.S. Gallery, New York
- 1985 Half in the Sky, Australian Women Artists, Art Gallery South Australia

=== Represented ===
Macqueen is represented in many major Australian art galleries such as the National Gallery of Australia, National Gallery of Victoria, Art Gallery of New South Wales, Queensland Art Gallery and numerous regional Australian art galleries. Numerous works are also held in the Cruthers Collection of Women's Art.

== See also ==
Kenneth Macqueen (1897–1960), another Australian watercolorist, but not known to be related
