= Charles William Bush =

Australian painter

Charles William Bush (23 November 1919 – 13 November 1989) was an Australian painter.

== History ==
Bush was born in the Melbourne suburb of North Carlton, the son of signwriter Andrew Charles Thomas Bush (born 1898), and Alice Maud Bush née Rohsburn (died 21 April 1936)

He was educated at the newly opened Coburg East School and, during that time, his four-year-old brother was struck by a car and killed in 1929, while the pair were crossing Bell Street, Coburg. Bush attended Coburg High School to age 14, then began studying art at the National Gallery of Victoria (NGV) school. It may have been around that time that he started working at his father's business. His mother died a few years later, in 1936.

The relationship with his father (who also had the responsibility of another son, Reginald George Bush (c. 1929 – 12 November 1950)) became strained, so Bush left home to live at Essendon with the parents of fellow-student Phyllis (Phyl) Waterhouse (1917–1989). The two young artists later rented a studio in Essendon and began living together. It became a long-term relationship, but they only married on 21 June 1979.

Bush was called up for National Service, with the Citizen Military Forces (CMF) 1941–1943, then transferred to the 2nd AIF as war artist with the Army Historical Unit 1943–1946, achieving the rank of lieutenant.

In 1949, he received a British Council grant which took him to London, where he studied under Bernard Meninsky then exhibited at the Royal Academy in 1951

He was appointed teacher of drawing at the NGV school in 1954.

In the late 1950s and early 1960s, he compered a weekly television program, My Fair Lady, on HSV-7 in Melbourne. He also appeared in a version of the show on ADS-7 in Adelaide.

In 1962, he co-founded (retired 1972) Leveson Street Gallery in North Melbourne, with Phyl Waterhouse and June Davies.

He was art critic for The Australian for a number of years from 1966.
