= Louis Kahan =

Austrian-born Australian artist

Louis Kahan AO
- Born: Ludwig Kahan; 25 May 1905; Vienna, Austria-Hungary
- Died: 16 July 2002 (aged 97); Melbourne, Victoria, Australia
- Known for: Portraits
- Awards: Archibald Prize 1962

Louis Kahan AO (25 May 1905 – 16 July 2002) was an Austrian-born Australian artist whose long career included fashion design, illustration for magazines and journals, painting, printmaking and drawing. He is represented in most major collections in Australia as well as in Europe and USA. He won the Archibald Prize in 1962 with a portrait of Patrick White.

== Biography ==
Louis Kahan was born in Vienna on 25 May 1905 to Russian Jewish parents, Wolf and Dina (nee Kutcherska), who were from the Ukraine and had fled Pogroms in the Russian Empire.He initially trained as a tailor with his father. However, he was particularly drawn to art and as a young man sketched his father's clients, who included famous actors and musicians of the day. In 1925 he travelled from Vienna to Paris where he worked with renowned couturier Paul Poiret, first as a tailor and then designer. Through Poiret he met many artists, including Henri Matisse, Raoul Dufy and Maurice de Vlaminck. He designed costumes for Josephine Baker, Colette and the Folies Bergère. He immersed himself in the bohemian life of the city and began life drawing in Montparnasse. At this time he also produced freelance illustrations for newspapers and magazines.

He studied printmaking at Académie de la Grande Chaumière in Paris and Hornsey College of Art in London.

He enlisted in the French Foreign Legion in 1939 and was sent to Algeria, North Africa as a war artist, although he had never received any formal art training. He had an exhibition at Oran in 1942. He was a voluntary artist for the Red Cross between 1943 and 1945. During this time, photography of soldiers was not permitted. Louis made over 2,000 drawings of wounded soldiers being cared for in the hospital at Oran and these were v-mailed (an early form of microfilm) to the families of soldiers. When he found that the originals were being destroyed after transmission Kahan began to save them and over 300 were later given by him to the Red Cross Museum in Washington, USA.

He returned to Paris after the war, and was employed by Le Figaro to sketch the court scenes of the war trials.

After travelling across the United States he moved to the Perth suburb of Dianella in Western Australia to join his family. His parents and sister had fled the Holocaust in Europe in 1939 and settled in Australia shortly before the Second World War. In Perth he had his first solo exhibition and began to be recognised by the art world, with work purchased by the Art Gallery of Western Australia.

He moved to Melbourne in 1950 where his talent for portraiture was recognised by Melbourne Herald art critic, Alan McCulloch, who introduced him to Clem Christesen, editor of Meanjin. He made many portraits of Australian and other celebrities, including Geoffrey Blainey, Judy Cassab, Manning Clark, Arthur Boyd, Dame Joan Sutherland, Yehudi Menuhin and Luciano Pavarotti. Many of the original drawings for Meanjin are now in the Baillieu Collection of Melbourne University.

After living in London for some time he returned to Australia in 1959 and then to Melbourne in 1960. Here he collaborated with producer Stephen Haag, designing sets and costumes for opera and theatre. The Victorian Art Centre, Melbourne, has a large collection of his portraits of musicians, and set and costume designs.

In his paintings, prints and drawings Louis Kahan explored many interests and themes, including dreams, death, and his own life. Childhood games, portraits and nudes were ongoing subjects. Symbolism particularly characterises his later works. Later, dreamlike prints and paintings often show Kahan's tools of the trade: palette, brushes, tailor's scissors and tape. These represent a kind of metaphorical self-portrait and life history.

In 1970, the Victorian Friends of the Hebrew University organised his exhibition Travel Impressions. It featured his landscapes of Hydra and Israel.

In 1981, the exhibition hall of the Sydney Opera House hosted his exhibition, Great Music Makers. The exhibition was initiated and arranged by Sydney Conservatorium of Music. It includes drawings of musicians such as Larry Adler, Claudio Arrau, Jacqueline du Pré, Jascha Heifetz, Witold Małcużyński, Zubin Mehta, Eugene Ormandy, Itzhak Perlman, Arthur Rubinstein, Henryk Szeryng, Isaac Stern and Zvi Zeitlin. The exhibition was staged again in 1994 at the Westpac Gallery of the Victorian Arts Centre.

In 1990, Niagara Galleries staged his exhibition, Survey Exhibition 1947-1990.

In 1991, the Art Gallery of Western Australia staged a retrospective of his drawings and watercolours.

In 1993, Kahan was appointed an Officer of the Order of Australia for service to the arts.

In 1997, the Jewish Museum of Australia staged an exhibition, Louis Kahan - a Portrait, of Kahan's work.

== Personal life ==
On a return trip to Perth in 1953 he met and married Lily Isaac. They had two daughters together, who both became artists.

He and his family settled permanently in Kew in Melbourne in 1960.

=== Death ===
He died in Melbourne in 2002, aged 97.

Awards
Preceded by William Edwin Pidgeon	Archibald Prize; 1962 for Patrick White	Succeeded by J. Carrington Smith
