= Len Annois =

Australian painter (1906–1966)

Leonard Lloyd Annois (1 July 1906 – 10 July 1966) was an Australian painter of watercolors.

== History ==
Annois was born in the Melbourne suburb of Malvern to William Alfred Annois and Elsie Miriam Annois, née Lloyd. His father was a well-known cricketer and singer, a member of the Harmonists quartet and male alto in St Paul's Cathedral choir.

Annois participated in numerous exhibitions and won numerous prizes for his art, which has been praised for its use of traditional English techniques with modern sensibilities, and has been associated with ballet in various contexts.

He spent most of the year 1950 in London, working and associating closely with other Australian artists, before returning to Australia and another exhibition at Georges Gallery, 162 Collins Street.

== Personal ==
Annois married Mavis Nunn of St Kilda, Victoria, on 17 February 1928. They had a son and a daughter. He died suddenly in Melbourne on 10 July 1966.
