= Dictionary of Australian Biography =

Biographical encyclopaedia of Australians deceased before 1943

- Author: Percival Serle (1871–1951)
- Language: English
- Subject: Biographies of notable Australians who died before 1942
- Genre: Encyclopaedia
- Publisher: Angus and Robertson
- Publication date: 1949
- Publication place: Australia
- Dewey Decimal: 920.094

The Dictionary of Australian Biography, published in 1949, is a reference work by Percival Serle containing information on notable people associated with Australian history. With approximately a thousand entries, the book took more than twenty years to complete. Published by Angus and Robertson, the dictionary was compiled as two volumes, Volume 1: A–K; and Volume 2: L–Z.

The book contains 1,030 biographies of Australians, or people who were closely connected with Australia, who died before the end of 1942. According to Serle in his preface:

This date closed the first one hundred and fifty years of Australia's history, for although the first fleet arrived in January 1788, the first emigrant ship, the Bellona, did not come until January 1793. Until then Australia had been merely a dumping ground for convicts, but the arrival of free emigrants foreshadowed the founding of a nation.

— Percival Serle, 1949

== Format ==
The average length of the biographies is about 640 words. Serle classified them roughly into the following twelve groups:

Group		No. of profiles
No.	Name	No. of profiles
1	Army and navy	10
2	Artists, including architects, actors and musicians	130
3	Governors and administrators	50
4	Lawyers	69
5	Literary men and women	137
6	Notorieties	17
7	Pioneers, explorers, pastoralists, men of business	161
8	Politicians	174
9	Scholars, philosophers, clergy	76
10	Scientists, including physicians, surgeons and engineers	140
11	Social reformers, philanthropists, educationists	53
12	Sporting men (cricketers and athletes)	13

Of the above profiles, the number of women included was 42 or 4 percent of the biographies. Forty-seven percent of those included in the book were born in England, 27 percent in Australia, 12 percent Scotland, 8 percent Ireland, 1 percent Wales and remaining 5 percent were from the rest of the world which included twelve from the United States, nine from Germany, and six from New Zealand.

== Awards ==
- 1949 ALS Gold Medal, winner

== Publication details ==
- Serle, Percival (1949). Dictionary of Australian Biography. Project Gutenberg Australia. LCCN 49006289. OCLC 1956219. OL 7423467W. Wikidata Q5273962.

== Notes ==
In a letter published in The Age newspaper following the announcement of the awarding of the Als Gold medal, critic Nettie Palmer pointed out that the book was not a "biography of Australian literature" but rather a dictionary of Australian biography.

== See also ==
Prior to its publication similar Australian reference works included:

- Heaton, John Henniker (1897). Australian Dictionary of Dates and Men of the Time.
- Blair, David (1881). Blair's Cyclopaedia of Australasia.
- Mennell, Philip (1892). The Dictionary of Australasian Biography from the Inauguration of Responsible Government.
- Johns, Fred (1906). Johns's Notable Australians. Later editions were published as Who's Who in Australia.
- Johns, Fred (1934). An Australian Biographical Dictionary.
- The Australian Encyclopaedia. 1926.

Subsequently, other Australian biographical dictionaries have been released including the Australian Dictionary of Biography from 1966 and Who's Who in Australia.
