= Dorothy Ellsmore Paul =

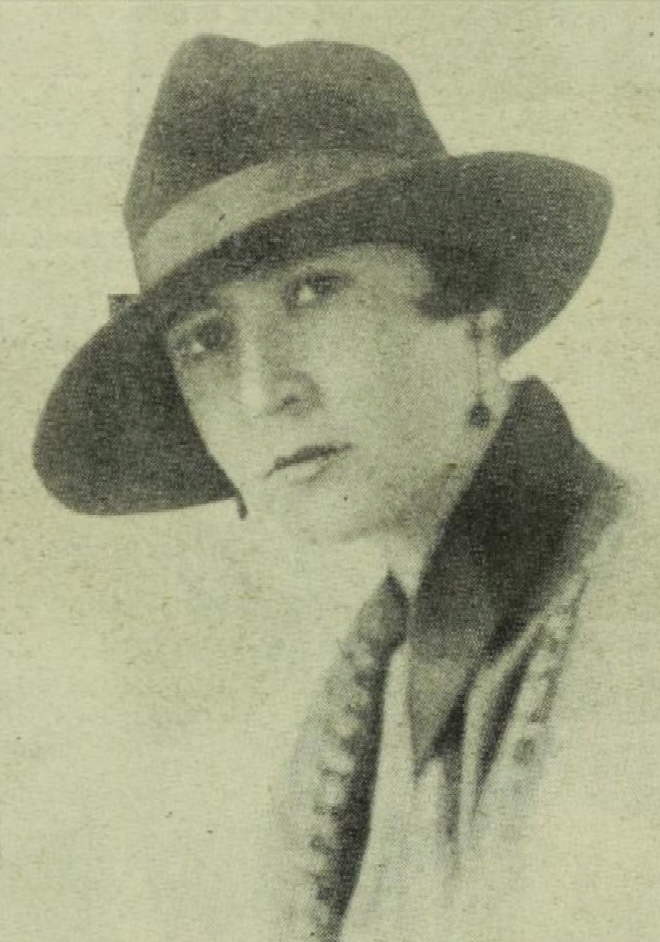
- Born: Dorothy May Ellsmore; 3 February 1902; Hertfordshire, England
- Died: July 1973 (aged 71)
- Education: Julian Ashton Art School
- Known for: Cartoons
- Spouse: Mick Paul

Dorothy Ellsmore Paul (née Dorothy May Ellsmore; 3 February 1902 – July 1973) was an Australian artist and cartoonist.

== Biography ==
Paul was born Dorothy May Ellsmore in 1902 in Hertfordshire, England. She trained as an artist at Portsmouth Technical College. She left for Australia at just nineteen years old, arriving in Sydney on 18 March 1921. Once in Sydney she trained under Julian Ashton. She had ambitions of becoming a sculptor though this never eventuated.

She was first published in The Sun with the cartoon We Do Believe in Fairies in their Sunbeams section. By 1924 she was drawing cartoons for the soldiers' magazine Aussie alongside fellow female cartoonists Mahdi McCrae, Betty and Esther Paterson, and Lillian Pedersen. The same year she exhibited her work in a black and white show at Anthony Hordern and Sons' Fine Art Gallery with such artists as Norman Lindsay, Percy Leason, and David Low.

In 1926 she was illustrating short stories for The Australian Women's Mirror and the Sydney Mail. Her illustrations also featured in The Bulletin. In 1929 she edited a book The Etched Work of Sydney Long which included a sketch of hers of the artist. They were both associated with the Australian Painters-Etchers Society. Paul wrote the introduction for the Society's publication The Charm of the Etching.

From 1931 to 1934 Paul wrote a feature section for The Australian Women's Mirror. She started with the technique for linocuts and also wrote on pattern printing, embroidery, crafting cuddle toys, making evening gloves, and even a frog pyjama case for children. These crafts and designs were featured in The Sun and The Mercury. She wrote and illustrated the stories Portrait of a Dark Girl and In Search of a Grandmother.

She married fellow artist Oswald "Mick" Paul in 1925, son of artist and social reformer Emily Letitia Paul. His portrait of her was a finalist for the 1929 Archibald Prize.

Paul has works in the collections of the National Library of Australia, the National Gallery of Australia, the State Library of New South Wales, and a bookplate of Sydney Long in the National Library of New Zealand.
