= Mahdi McCrae =

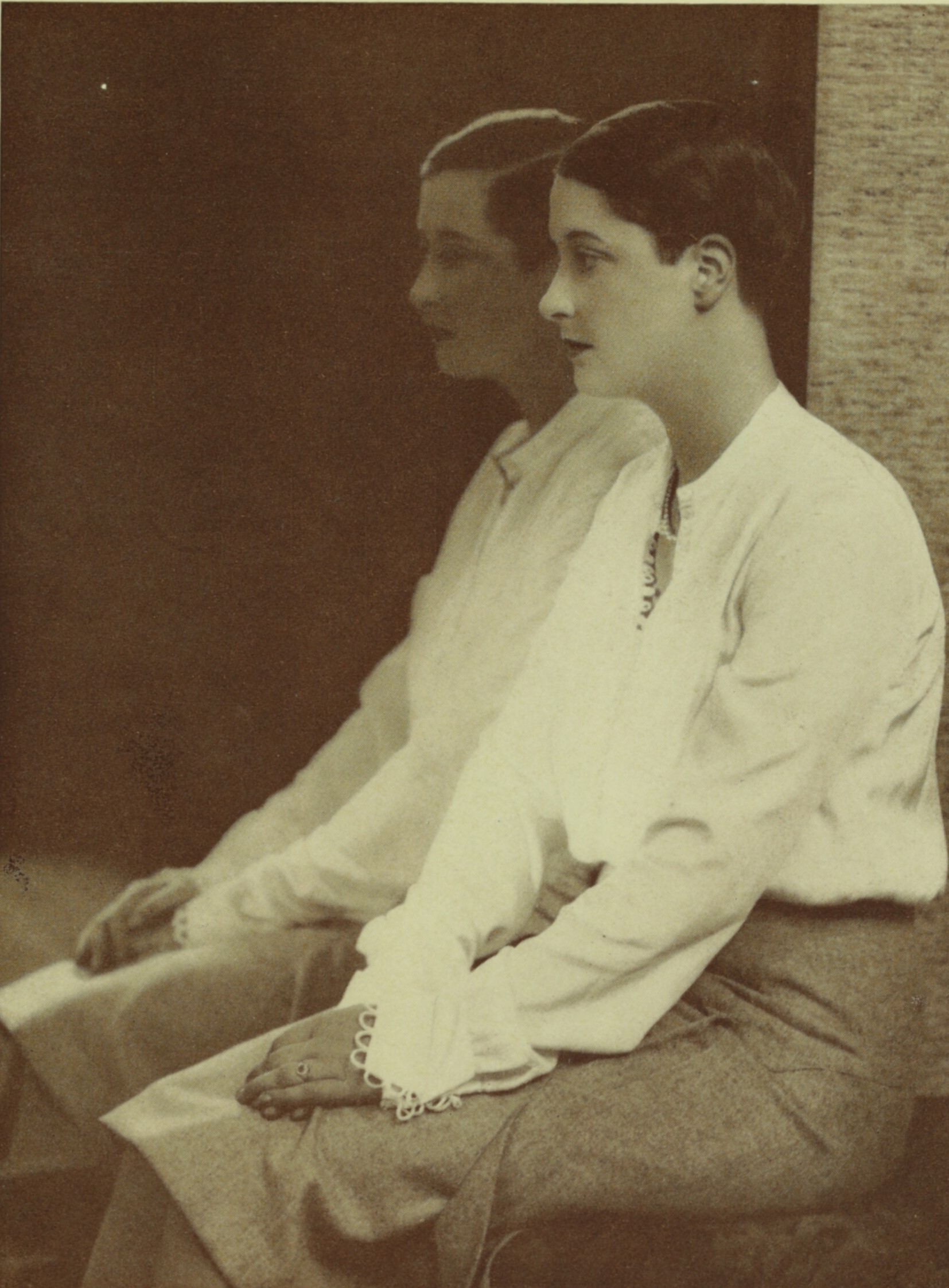
- Born: Marjory Francesca McCrae; 28 November 1907; Roseville, New South Wales, Australia
- Died: 23 June 1990 (aged 82)
- Occupation: Cartoonist
- Relatives: Hugh McCrae (father) George Gordon McCrae (grandfather) Georgiana McCrae (great grandmother)

Marjory Francesca "Mahdi" McCrae (28 November 1907 – 23 June 1990) was an Australian artist and cartoonist.

== Biography ==
Marjory Francesca McCrae was born in Roseville, New South Wales to noted poet Hugh Raymond McCrae and Annie Geraldine McCrae (née Adams). Her grandfather was surveyor and writer George Gordon McCrae and her great-grandmother was the painter and diarist Georgiana McCrae. Mahdi had two sisters, Dorothea born in 1903 and Georgiana born in 1912. Her father was friends with the artist Norman Lindsay, who illustrated his books Colombine and Satyrs and Sunlight. Norman taught Mahdi to draw and paint in watercolours. She was also a student of Thea Proctor.

Her work was published in the magazine Aussie at just fourteen years old. She was featured alongside fellow female cartoonists Dorothy Ellsmore Paul, and sisters Betty and Esther Paterson. At nineteen she had her first exhibition of fifty drawings at the Sydney Art Salon which included a caricature of painter Hans Heysen. Her work was described as "[Having] imagination and a flair for the unusual."

As a member of the prominent McCrae family Mahdi enjoyed a privileged position to be able to socialise and explore her art. Her illustrations for Aussie often featured fashionable men and women and she herself helped to organise balls. Her own fashion would get commented on in the Truth and she attended events at the Royal Sydney Golf Club. She would later design costumes for her father's theatre production The Ship of Heaven. This would not be the only father-daughter collaboration, with Mahdi also illustrating My Father and My Father's Friends.

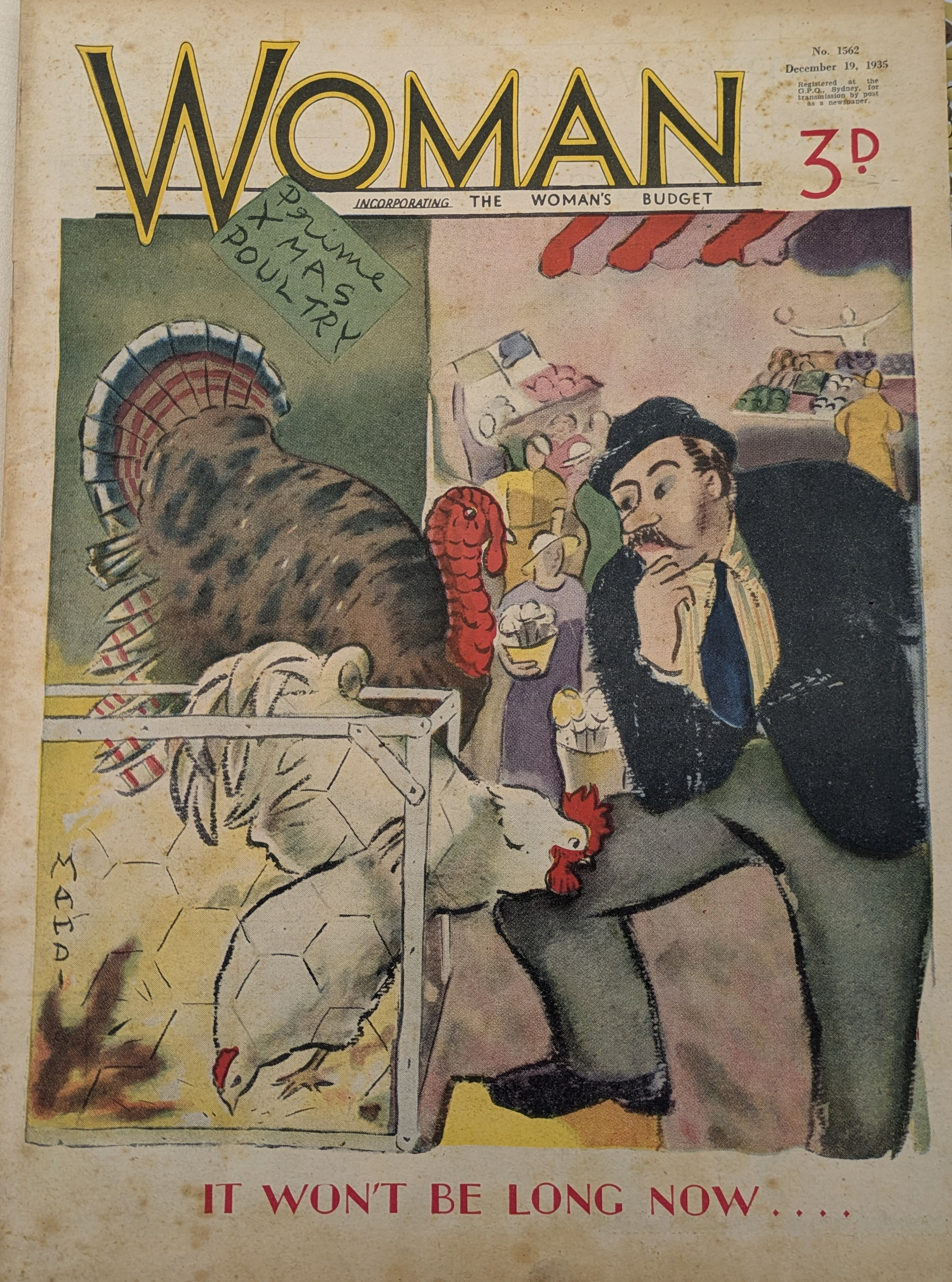
Cover of Woman magazine illustrated by Mahdi, 1935.

In addition to Aussie her work was published in The Home, The New Triad, The Bulletin, and Smith's Weekly. She had a long-running comic strip Michael and Chrystabel in the magazine Woman. Her sister Georgiana "Smee" McCrae was also published in Aussie. She joined 32 artists including Margaret Preston and May Gibbs in illustrating Ink, an annual sponsored by the Society of Women Writers of N.S.W. She even illustrated a story by David McNicoll in the Sydney Morning Herald. Mahdi would be described in The New Triad as "one of the most brilliant young artists in Sydney."

Perhaps the most prolific contributions by McCrae were her drawings of Hollywood stars for The Sun. These included Marlene Dietrich, Spencer Tracy, Bing Crosby, and Greta Garbo. Mahdi wed Ron McWilliam in 1930 and continued to work as an artist after her marriage. She kept contributing to The Sun until at least 1939.

McCrae also illustrated books with Where the Stars are Born by George Spaul in 1942, the English translation of German children's book Hauff's Tales in 1949, and William Pacey's The Adventures of King Kobar in 1954.

She was known for her sense of humour, sitting on the desk of her first boss at Woman and telling him "I never want to work here again." She would also whip out her sketch book at restaurants to embarrass her friends by drawing fellow diners. She has works in the collections of the State Library of New South Wales, and the State Library of Victoria.
