= Mabel Pye =

Australian artist

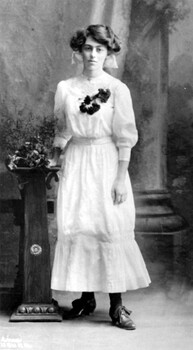
- Born: 9 April 1894; Box Hill, Victoria, Australia
- Died: 4 March 1982 (aged 87); Canterbury, Victoria
- Education: National Gallery School
- Known for: Painting, Printmaking

Mabel Pye (9 April 1894 — 4 March 1982) was an Australian artist noted for painting and printmaking.

== Early life and training ==
Pye was born in Box Hill in 1894 to Alice Eleanor Noar and her husband William Edward Pye who married in 1893. She had a younger sister Hazel, also an artist, and their father built them a studio at the back of their Loch Street home in Surrey Hills, Victoria. Her family was associated with amateur theatre group 'The Benwerrin Players'. Mabel had to be rescued when swimming at Moon Bay near Black Rock when she was 19, which she visited with her family. She studied at the National Gallery School with Adelaide Perry and Napier Wallace under Bernard Hall. She studied drawing from 1912-1915, and painting 1915-1919.

== Career ==
Working in watercolours and linocuts, Pye painted landscapes, still-lifes, and portraits with bold colours and lines. She was a member of the Victorian Artists Society from 1918-1941, and the Melbourne Society of Women Painters and Sculptors, with whom she served on the committee with Esther Paterson, Ola Cohn, Jessie Mackintosh, Sybil Craig, Lina Bryans, and Violet McInnes. As well as exhibiting with both societies she also protested to the Lord Mayor about destruction of trees on Alexandra Avenue.

She was particularly noted for her ballet scenes. As part of their training Russian student dancers were made to visit art shows, and Pye painted impressions from memory of the Ballet Rambert, and was also a member of the Australian Ballet Society. She was also known for landscapes, painting atmospheric works of the Blue Dandenongs.

She has works in the collections of State Library Victoria, the Art Gallery of New South Wales, and the National Gallery of Victoria.

== Death ==
In later life she lived in Montrose and Olinda, and died in 1982 in Mont Calm, Canterbury.
