= Dictionary of Australasian Biography =

Biographical dictionary by Philip Mennell

The Dictionary of Australasian Biography, sub-titled "Comprising Notices of Eminent Colonists From the Inauguration of Responsible Government Down to the Present Time." published in 1892, is a reference work by Philip Mennell containing information on notable Australian colonists and New Zealanders of the period 1855 to 1892.

The book was published by Hutchinson & Co. in London and consists of over 1500 biographies. The work is now in the public domain as the author died (in 1905) over 100 years ago.

== Similar dictionaries ==
- Dictionary of Australian Biography by Percival Serle, first published in 1949
- Australian Dictionary of Biography, whose first volume was edited by Douglas Pike and published by the Melbourne University Press in 1966. This Dictionary later published by the National Centre of Biography at the Australian National University and is available both as a hardcopy publication and online
