= Elsie Barlow =

Australian artist (1876–1948)

- Born: Elsie Frederica Hake; 1876; Melbourne, Victoria, Australia
- Died: 1948 (aged 71–72); Mentone, Victoria, Australia
- Known for: Painting, Printmaking
- Spouse: Arthur Barlow (m. 1901–1917)

Elsie Frederica Barlow (1876 – 15 November 1948), was an Australian painter and printmaker. She was a founding member of Twenty Melbourne Painters. She was also the first woman to have a solo exhibition in Castlemaine, Victoria.

== Biography ==
Elsie Frederica Barlow née Hake was born in 1876 in Melbourne, Australia. She was one of seven children, the youngest of six girls born to Sidney Hake and Charlotte Hemsley.

In 1894, Barlow enrolled at the Gallery School of Design where she was taught by Frederick McCubbin and Lindsay Bernard Hall. She attended the National Gallery School with her sister Dora Serle. Elsie and Dora both showed an early interest in art, taking classes at St Kilda Town Hall when they were children.

She was represented in an exhibition of Australian art at the Grafton Galleries London in 1898. Her painting Welcome News came second to Max Meldrum for the National Gallery School Travelling Scholarship in 1897.

In 1901 she married police magistrate Arthur Barlow, assistant to Sir John Madden. They had three children, a son Basil in 1904, daughter Nancy in 1906, and Betty in 1907 who died a few months after birth. They lived in Maryborough in 1909 and moved to Castlemaine in 1912.

Barlow participated in the First Australian Exhibition of Women's Work in 1907, winning 'Best Seascape' (watercolour), then in 1912 held a one woman show at the Mechanics' Institute in Castlemaine, where she displayed 90 paintings. This led to the eventual creation of the Castlemaine Art Gallery.

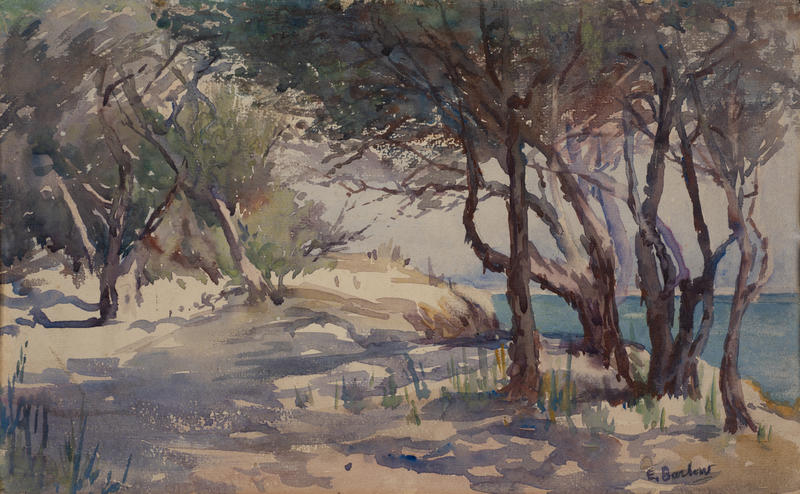
Elsie Barlow (c.1916) Beaumaris. Watercolour 22.3 x 35.3 cm. winner 'Best Seascape' (watercolour) at the First Australian Exhibition of Women's Work 1907. Castlemaine Art Museum. Gift of the artist

She had a studio in Collins Street with her sister Dora from 1899 to 1901. Barlow moved to Melbourne in 1916 and Arthur died shortly after. She opened a new studio in the Dunklings Building in Melbourne in 1919, holding an exhibition of 76 paintings and 6 pen drawings in June of that year.

She is acknowledged as the first woman to paint snowscapes which she would do by leaving the paper to weather outdoors while visiting her friend May Vale at Sassafras.

Barlow was a founding member of the Twenty Melbourne Painters Society.

Barlow died in a private hospital in Mentone, Victoria on 15 November 1948.

Watercolours of country and seaside, Pictures Collection, State Library Victoria

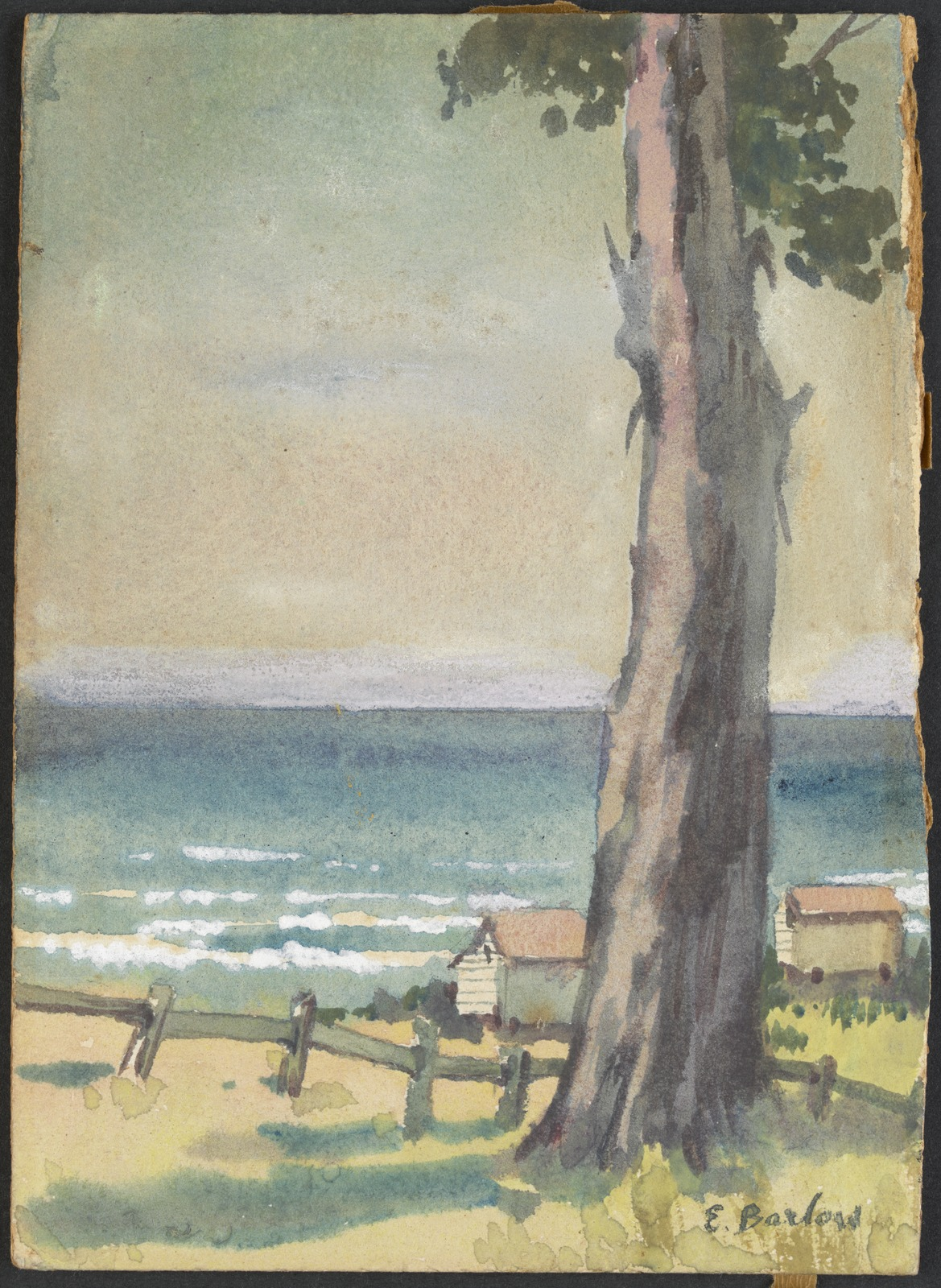
H2009.150/3

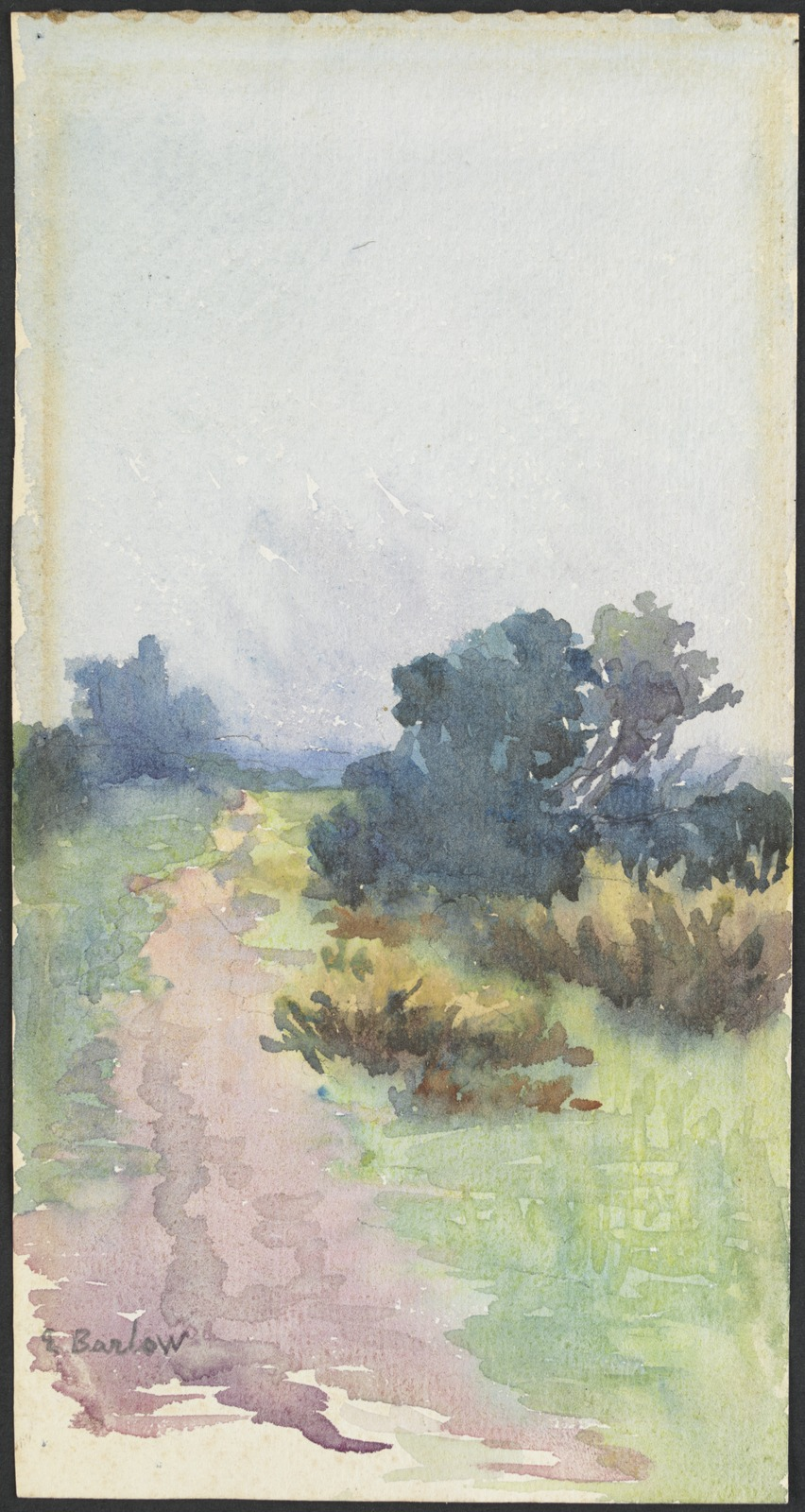
H2009.150/4

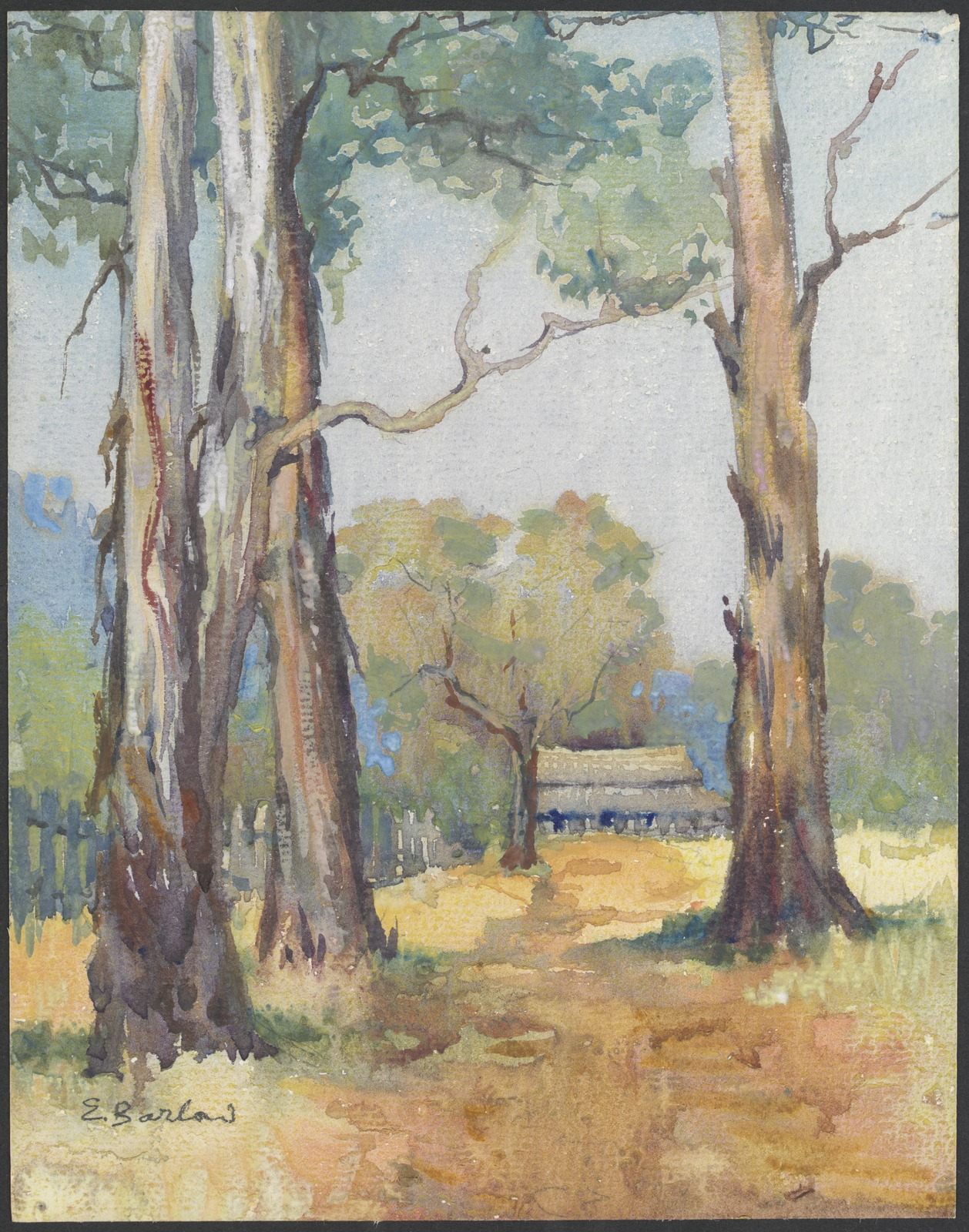
H2009.150/5

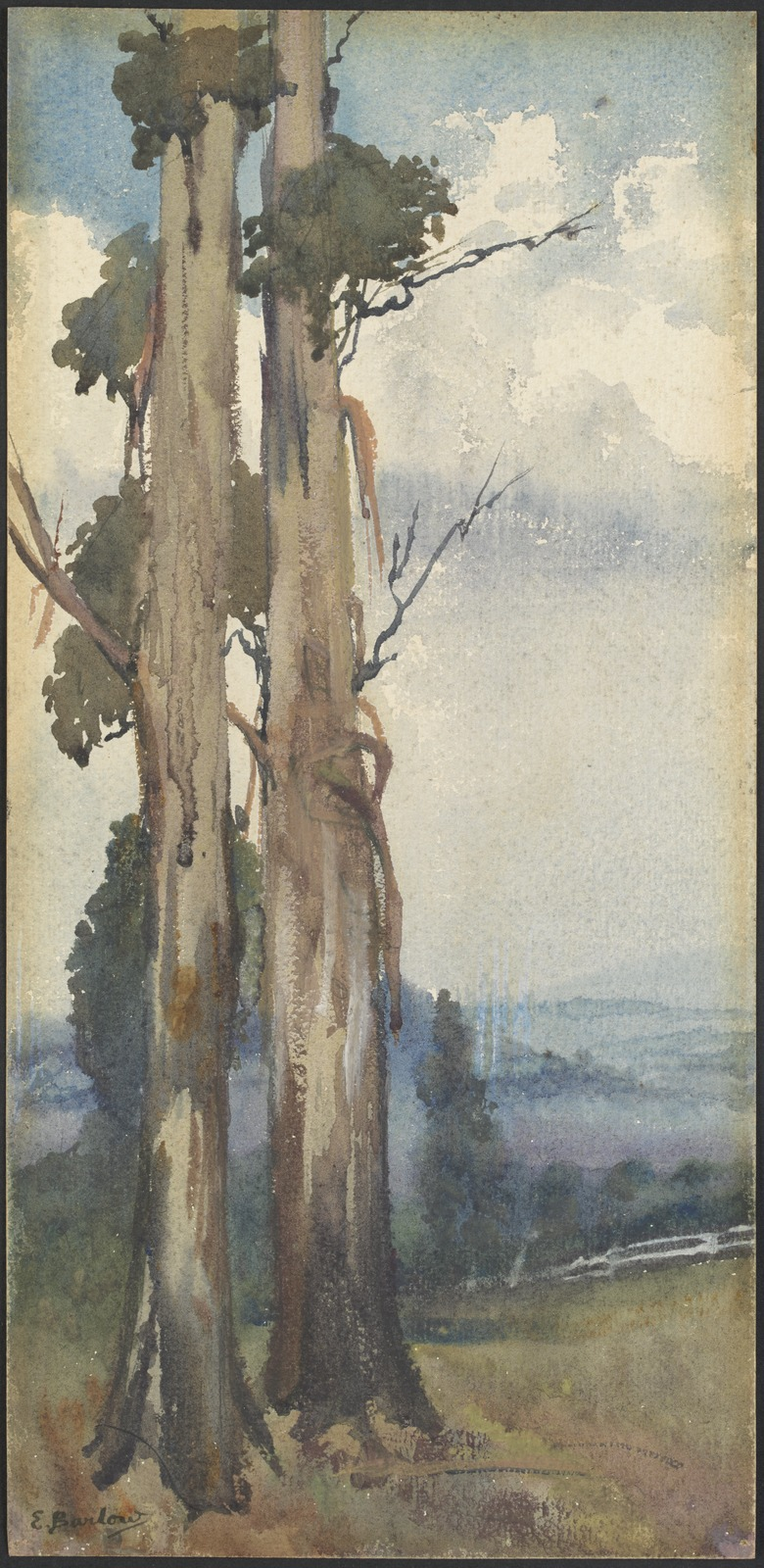
H2009.150/6

== Legacy ==
Retrospectives of her works were held in 1977 (at the Castlemaine Art Gallery) and 1978 (at the Duvance Galleries) to honour her as one of the founders of the Castlemaine Art Gallery and Historic Museum.

Hacke Place in the Canberra suburb of Conder is named in her honour and that of her older sister Dora, the misspelling of their maiden name being gazetted in 1988.
