= G. Hermon Gill =

George Hermon Gill
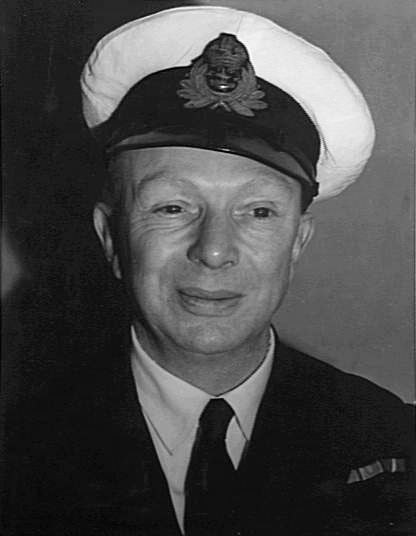
- Born: 8 March 1895; Fulham, London, England
- Died: 27 February 1973 (aged 77); East Melbourne, Victoria, Australia
- Relatives: Esther Paterson (wife)
- Military career
- Allegiance: United Kingdom; Australia
- Branch: Royal Australian Navy
- Service years: 1927–1953
- Rank: Commander
- Conflicts: First World War; Second World War
- Awards: Member of the Order of the British Empire

Commander George Hermon Gill, MBE, VD (8 March 1895 – 27 February 1973) was a Royal Australian Navy officer, mariner, journalist and naval historian who wrote the two volumes on the Royal Australian Navy in the official history series Australia in the War of 1939–1945.

== Biography ==
George Hermon Gill was born in Fulham, London, England, on 8 March 1895, the son of William Hermon Gill, a printer who worked for Cassell & Co, and his wife Alice née Clark. In April 1910 he went to sea as an apprentice with the Aberdeen Line. He obtained his second mate's certificate in 1914, and in December of that year came to Australia on the troop ship Themistocles, which carried the troops of the second contingent of the First AIF to Egypt. He served throughout the First World War with the Aberdeen Line, becoming a second officer, and ultimately receiving his master mariner's certificate in 1921. While serving as second officer on the SS Miltiades, he met Esther Paterson, an artist, who was a passenger on the ship.

Gill emigrated to Australia in 1922, and joined the staff of the Commonwealth Line in Melbourne. He married Paterson at her home in the Melbourne suburb of Middle Park on 2 June 1923. They had no children. He resigned his position with the Commonwealth Line in 1929, and took a holiday in England with Esther. When they returned to Australia, he became a freelance journalist, writing a weekly column for the Melbourne Star and later The Argus. He worked with the writer Frederick Howard on a film scenario entitled Fathful Journey based on Howard's novel The Emigrant. The scenario won a £250 prize in June 1939.

On 1 August 1927, Gill joined the Royal Australian Naval Volunteer Reserve with the rank of lieutenant. He was promoted to lieutenant commander on 30 June 1936, and called up to active duty on 4 September 1939, the day after Australia declared war on Germany. He was initially posted to HMAS Penguin, the shore base in Newcastle, New South Wales, where he served with the Examination and Naval Control services. On 16 February 1940, he was posted to HMAS Cerberus, the shore base in Melbourne, where he worked in the Navy Office as a press liaison officer with the Naval Intelligence Division. He edited the H.M.A.S. series of books, and became the head of the naval historical records section. For his services, he was made a Member of the Order of the British Empire in the 1943 Birthday Honours.

In 1944, with the war still raging, Gill was selected to write the naval volumes of the proposed official history of Australia in the War of 1939–1945. On 16 December 1944, he embarked on a six-month trip to Ceylon, Egypt, England and the United States to consult the records there before returning to Australia. He was demobilised on 14 November 1945, but remained a reservist, and was promoted to commander on 30 June 1947. He was transferred to the Retired List on 8 March 1953.

After the war Gill became editor of the journal Navy, and, commencing in the early 1950s, the South Melbourne Record, an independent weekly suburban newspaper. He also wrote a history of the State Electricity Commission of Victoria, Three Decades, which was published in 1949. All the while, work continued on the two volumes of the official history, Royal Australian Navy 1939-1942 and Royal Australian Navy 1942-1945, which were published in 1957 and 1968 respectively.

Gill died in East Melbourne on 27 February 1973, and his remains were cremated.
