= Alfred James Daplyn =

Australian artist

- Born: 1844; London
- Died: 19 July 1926 (aged 81–82); London
- Alma mater: Slade School of Fine Art
- Occupation: Painter, art educator

Alfred James Daplyn (1844 – 19 July 1926) was an English-born Australian artist.

Born in London, Daplyn studied there at the Slade School of Fine Art, the National Academy in New York City, under Jean-Léon Gérôme at École nationale supérieure des Beaux-Arts in Paris and in Rome.

Daplyn migrated to Melbourne in 1881, later becoming secretary of the New South Wales Art Society when he moved to Sydney. The Society's instructor in painting 1885–92, Daplyn influenced Charles Conder, Sydney Long and Julian Ashton. Around 1892, Daplyn spent a year painting in Samoa, meeting his old friend Robert Louis Stevenson.
