= Sydney Long =

Australian artist (1871–1955)

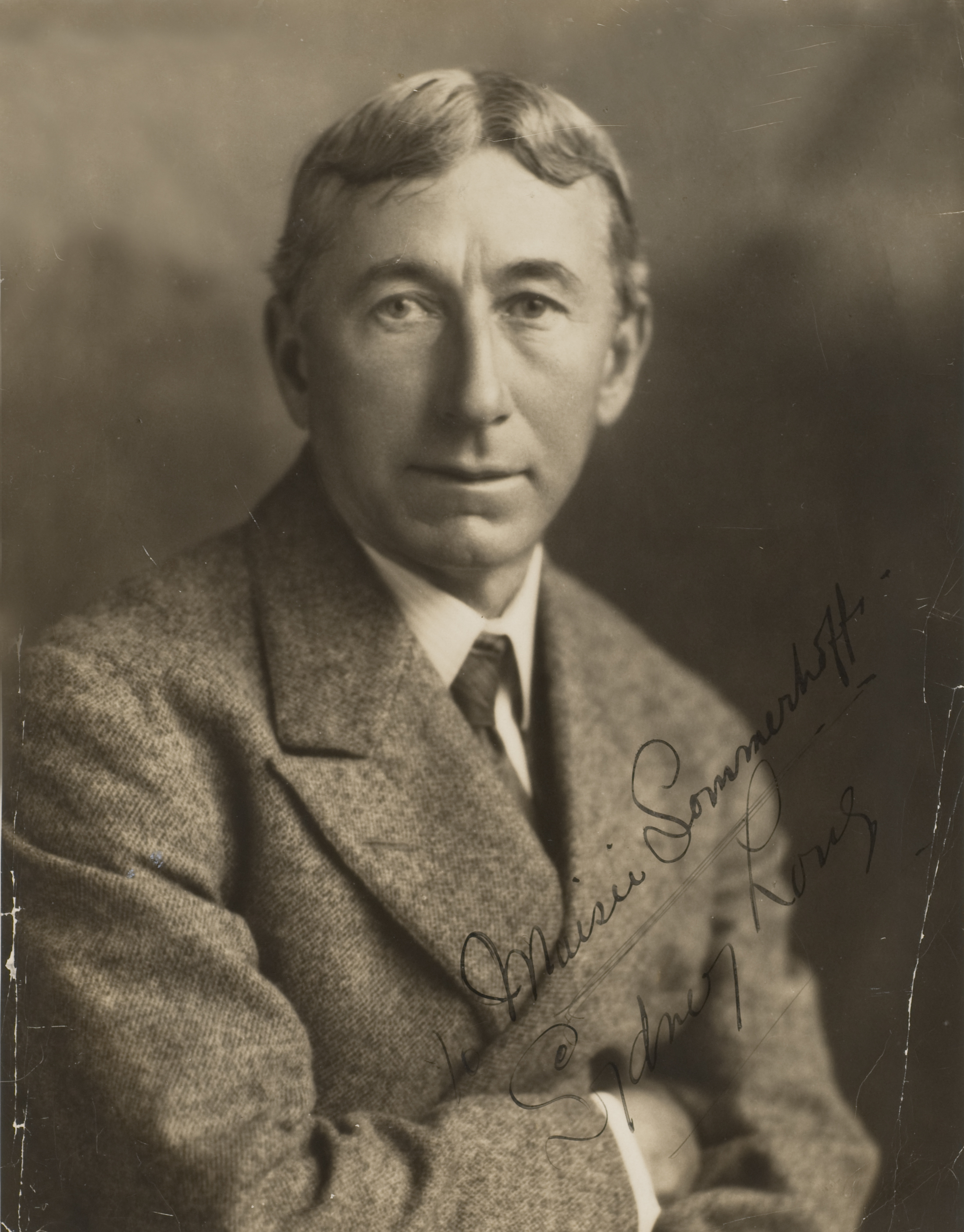
- Sydney Long, Australia, 1915-20
- Born: 20 August 1871; Goulburn, New South Wales, Australia
- Died: 23 January 1955 (aged 83); South Kensington, London, England
- Known for: Painting Printmaking

Sydney Long (20 August 1871 – 23 January 1955) was an Australian artist. Originally inspired by the Heidelberg School of Australian impressionism, Long developed his own Symbolist approach to the Australian landscape, and by the 1910s had become Australia's foremost Art Nouveau painter.

== Early life ==
For many years Sydney Long claimed to have been born on 15 November 1872. The researcher for the Australian Dictionary of Biography found that he was born on 20 August 1871 at Ifield, Goulburn, New South Wales, well after his father’s death. This uncertainty about his age and parentage may be why, in later years, he claimed to have been born in 1878.

More recently Anne Gray has discovered more possibilities for his parentage. She also discovered that although he claimed to have married Catherine Brennan in 1911, they did not marry until 1924. Despite the fluidity of Long’s biographical detail Gray has been able to verify some facts.

Sydney Long was born in Goulburn, the youngest of five siblings. He claimed to have had painting lessons from a Mrs Miller who taught him how to copy German oleographs and to paint on satin. The first painting he remembered seeing was at a country fair, a copy of H.J. Johnstone’s A billabong of the Goulburn, Victoria.

== Career ==
Sydney Long’s first known painting, The River House (1888), was probably painted shortly before he arrived in Sydney. There are records of his enrollment as an evening student at the New South Wales Art Society from 1892, where he was taught by Julian Ashton and A.J. Daplyn. He first exhibited at the Art Society’s Annual Exhibition in 1893, but by 1894 his first major painting, By Tranquil Waters, was purchased by the National Art Gallery of New South Wales. Ashton was the Trustee who advocated for the work, which was purchased “conditionally upon the artist cutting down lower portions giving more definition”. This is presumably why there are two visible signatures on the painting. The subject of boys bathing in Cooks River did cause some considerable attention, both from politicians and the media. Sappho Smith, the columnist of The Bulletin, described it as “Veal boys in a sea of ink” (6 October 1894). The critic of The Daily Telegraph wrote that it was “impudent in its very cleverness”, but The Sydney Mail wrote that “the most fastidious ‘stickler’ for propriety in art could raise no objection to studies from the nude if all artists were content to leave so much to the imagination.”

The sale enabled Long to leave his daytime employment. In 1895, when Julian Ashton, Tom Roberts and other impressionist artists left Art Society to form the Society of Artists, Long was on the initial committee. In the aftermath of the dispute, Ashton founded the Sydney Art School, and Long became one of the teachers, taking students on plein air painting excursions to the rural countryside west of Sydney. He was briefly engaged to one student, Thea Proctor, and she features in some of his paintings of this time.

This landscape inspired some of Long’s best loved landscape paintings including The Valley. However he is most widely known for his excursions into decorative Symbolism. His best known works in this style are The Spirit of the Plains (1897) and Pan (1898).

In 1902 the two warring art societies were briefly amalgamated under the new name of “Royal Art Society”. Long painted what he called “an amalgamated painting”, Flamingoes, with the dark tones favoured by the Art Society and the decorative style of the Society of Artists. He used the same model for both figures – the very young Rose Soady, who later became Rose Lindsay.

By 1907 he was second in charge of the Sydney Art School. His decorative paintings had been reproduced in the English art magazine, The Studio and he was saving to travel to Europe, and fame.

He arrived in London in September 1910, where he studied etching. Despite the intervention of World War I, he was moderately successful, and became an Associate of the Royal Society of Painter-Printmakers. On a return visit to Australia in 1921 he exhibited his English works and became one of the founders of the Australian Painters, Etchers and Engravers Society. At this time he abandoned his old links to the Society of Artists and instead began to exhibit with the conservative Royal Art Society. He returned to England in 1922, but in 1925 he returned to Sydney where he kept a studio in the city and a caravan at Narrabeen Lakes. His wife, Catherine Brennan, who he had married in England, returned with him.

The landscape around Narrabeen became the subject of many of his later paintings. From 1933 to 1949 he was a Trustee of the Art Gallery of New South Wales.

He was awarded Wynne Prize twice; in 1938 for The Approaching Storm, and in 1940 for The Lake, Narrabeen. In 1952, he was beginning to show signs of dementia so with his wife, he returned to England. In his extreme old age Long repudiated his decorative works. This may be why that after his death his widow tried, but failed, to prevent the National Art Gallery of New South Wales, from holding a memorial exhibition which focused on his early works.

== Style ==
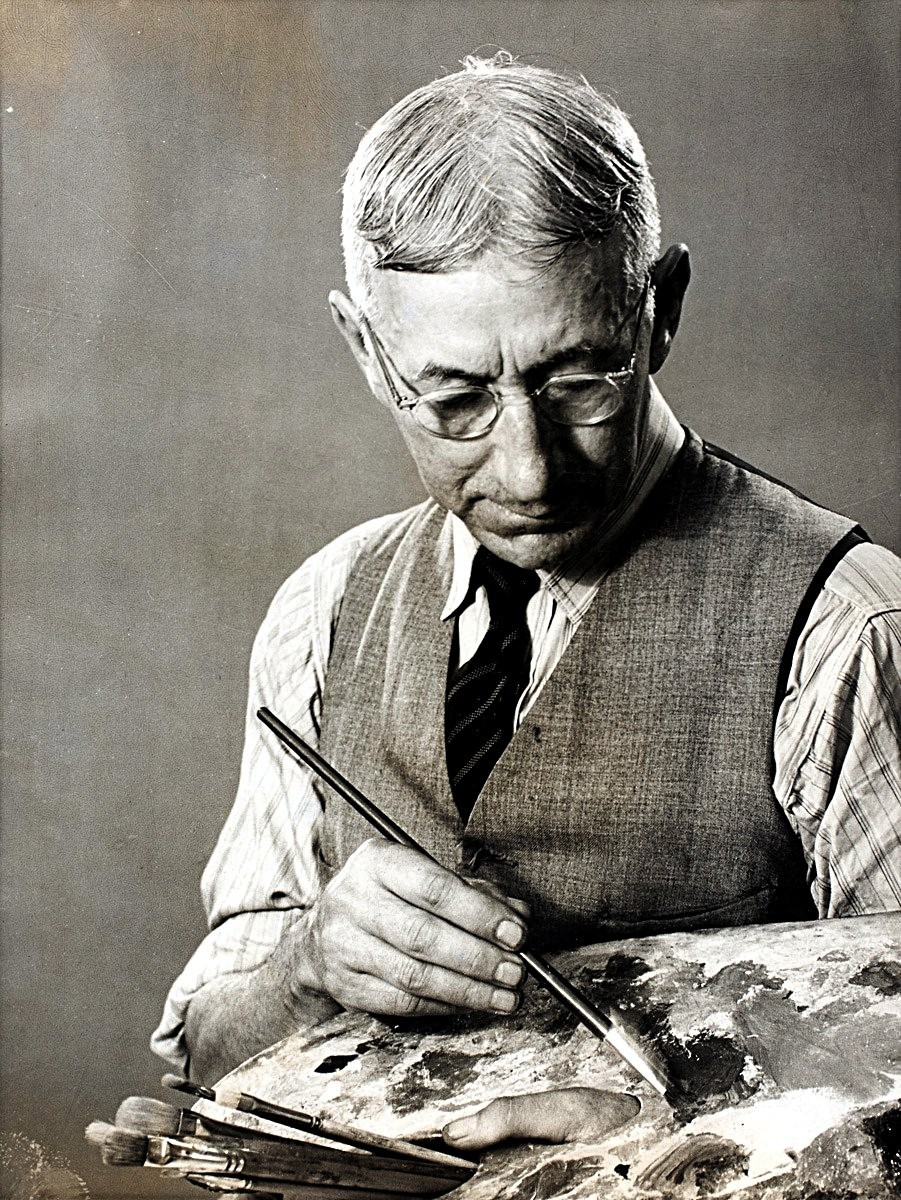
Sydney Long

While influenced by Australian Impressionism, Long's first major painting, By Tranquil Waters (1894), shows a markedly different engagement with the landscape. Long's painting of young naked bathers in a popular suburban swimming spot, owes a great deal to works reproduced in early issues of The Studio, a British publication that was easily available to Australian artists. The influence of The Studio, which advocated for the Arts and Crafts Movement can be seen in Long’s paintings from 1895 to 1909. Several of his paintings from this period were reproduced in the pages of ‘’The Studio’’.

Long's first major work in this style was The Spirit of the Plains (1897), using the flowing patterns and muted tones of Art Nouveau to create a poetic vision of a nymph leading a procession of dancing brolgas. The curve of the birds’ dance cleverly evokes a sideways treble clef, implying a musical connection. The etchings he later based on this painting became one of his most loved prints.

The following year he painted Pan which has a checkered history. It was first bought by the Art Gallery from the Society of Artists exhibition in 1898, then exchanged for ‘’Flamingoes’’ in 1902 before being lost for many years after a theft in 1905. In 1943 it appeared in an auction, where it was purchased by J.R. McGregor, a gallery trustee, who donated it back to the Art Gallery of NSW, where it remains on permanent view.

Pastorale (1909) the final painting in Long’s decorative series is lost. It remains in both Mildred Lovett’s painted Vase, an etching and a much later version of the painting, renamed after his death as Fantasy.

In London he studied printmaking at the Central School of Arts and Crafts where he was taught etching by Frank Emanuel and Malcolm Osborne. Some of his most successful etchings are reworkings of earlier paintings, while others are based on drawings and paintings make in England.

After his return to Australia he established a studio and etching workshop. A 1928 monograph by Dorothy Ellsmore Paul contains a complete catalogue of his etchings to that date. With the advent of the Great Depression the market for etchings collapsed.

In the last years of his working life, Long painted lush oil paintings, focussing on the landscape around Sydney’s northern beaches.

There have been four significant public exhibitions of Sydney Long’s work.

‘’Sydney Long A.R.E: Loan Exhibition’’ National Art Gallery of New South Wales, 1941

‘’ A memorial exhibition of a selection of paintings by Sydney Long 1878-1955 ’’ National Art Gallery of New South Wales, 1955

‘’Sydney Long’’ S.H. Ervin Museum and Art Gallery, National Trust of NSW, 1979

‘’Sydney Long: The spirit of the land’’, National Gallery of Australia, 2012

== Gallery ==
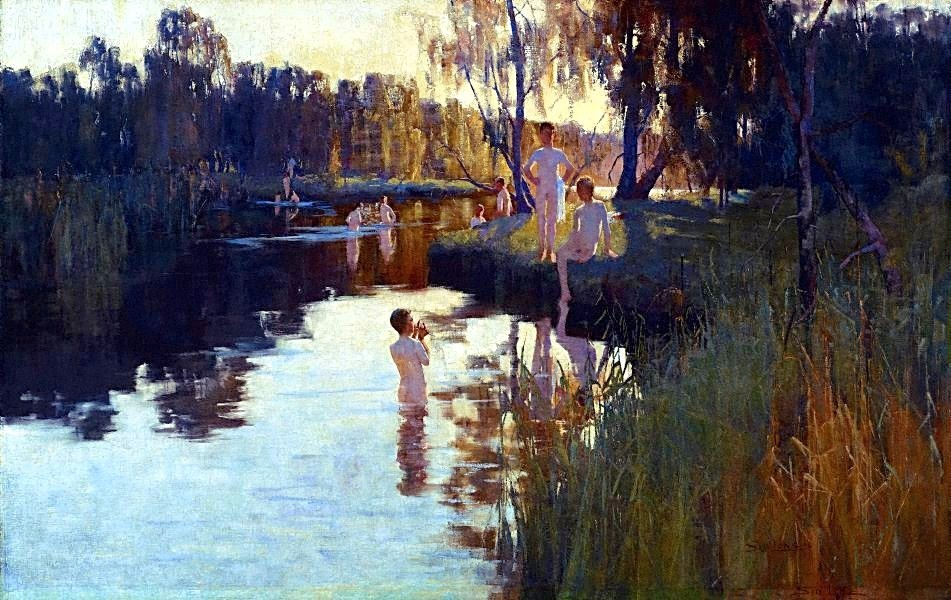
Sydney Long By tranquil waters 1894 Art Gallery of New South Wales, Sydney

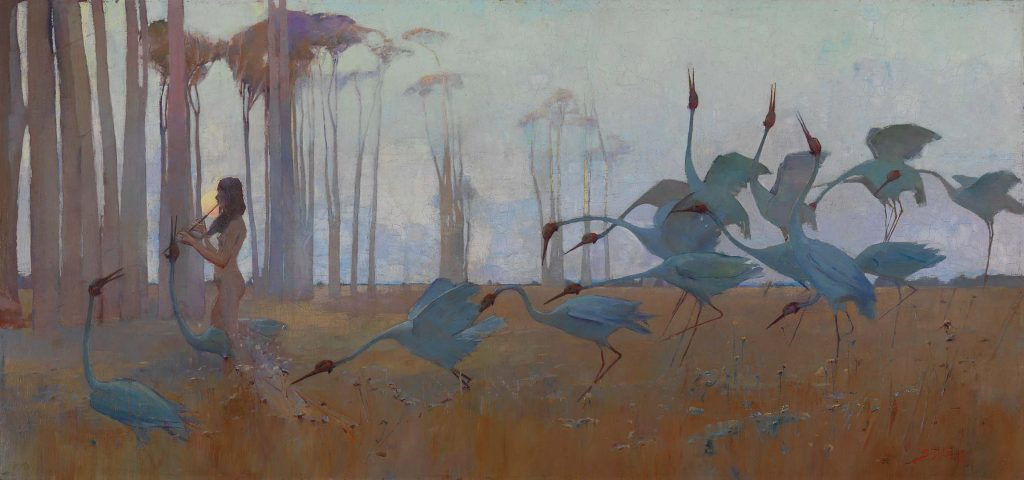
Sydney Long Spirit of the Plains 1897 Queensland Art Gallery, Brisbane

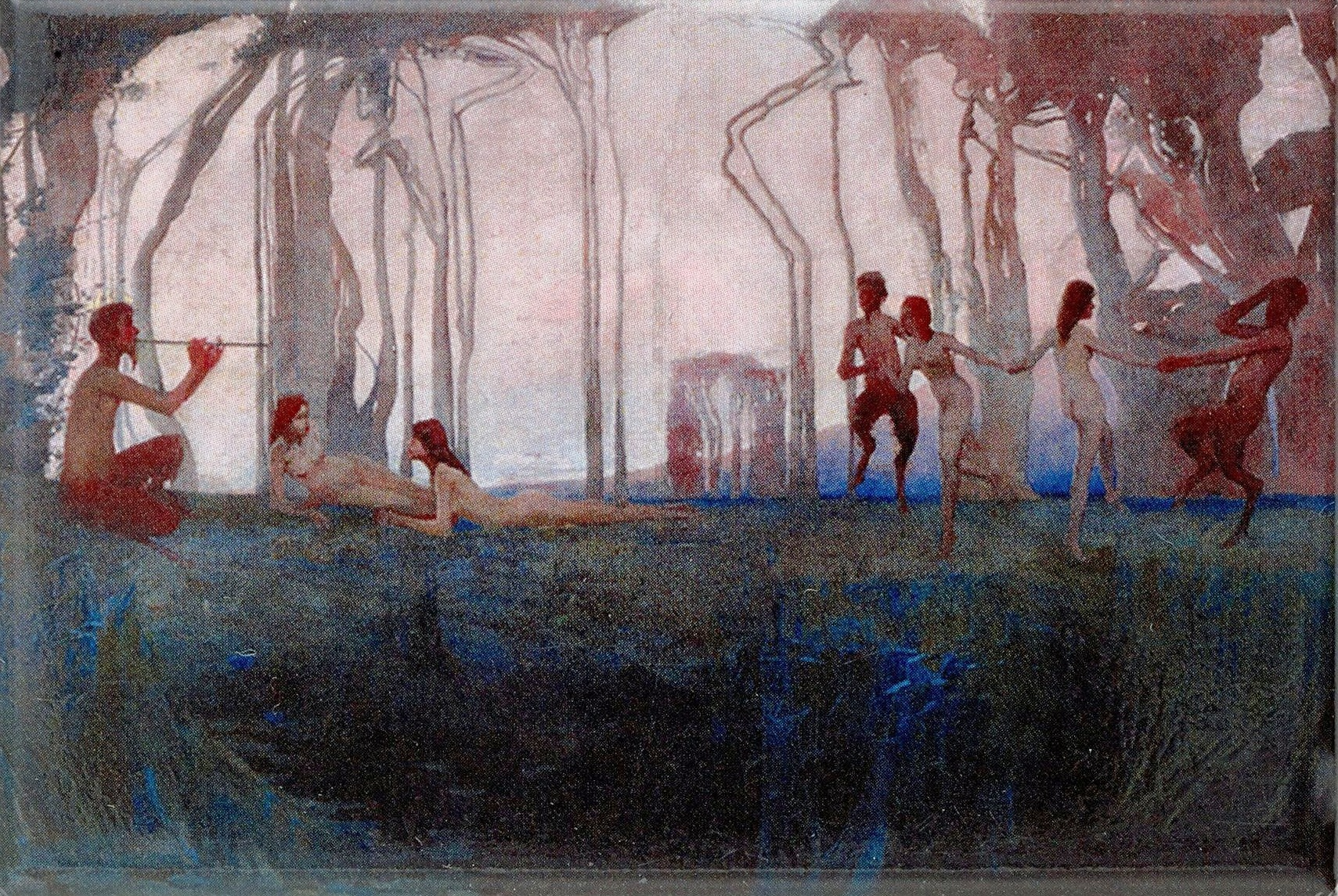
Long Pan 1898

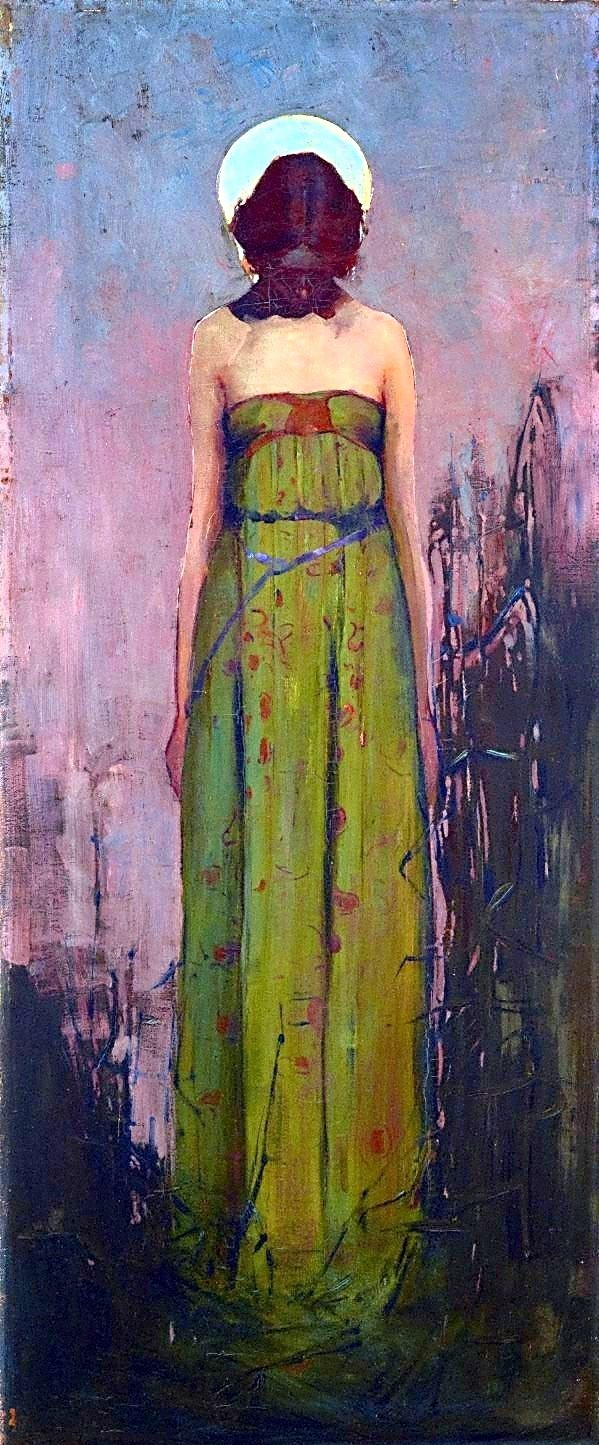
Sydney Long. Sadder than a single star that sets at twilight in a land of reeds 1899 Art Gallery of New South Wales, Sydney

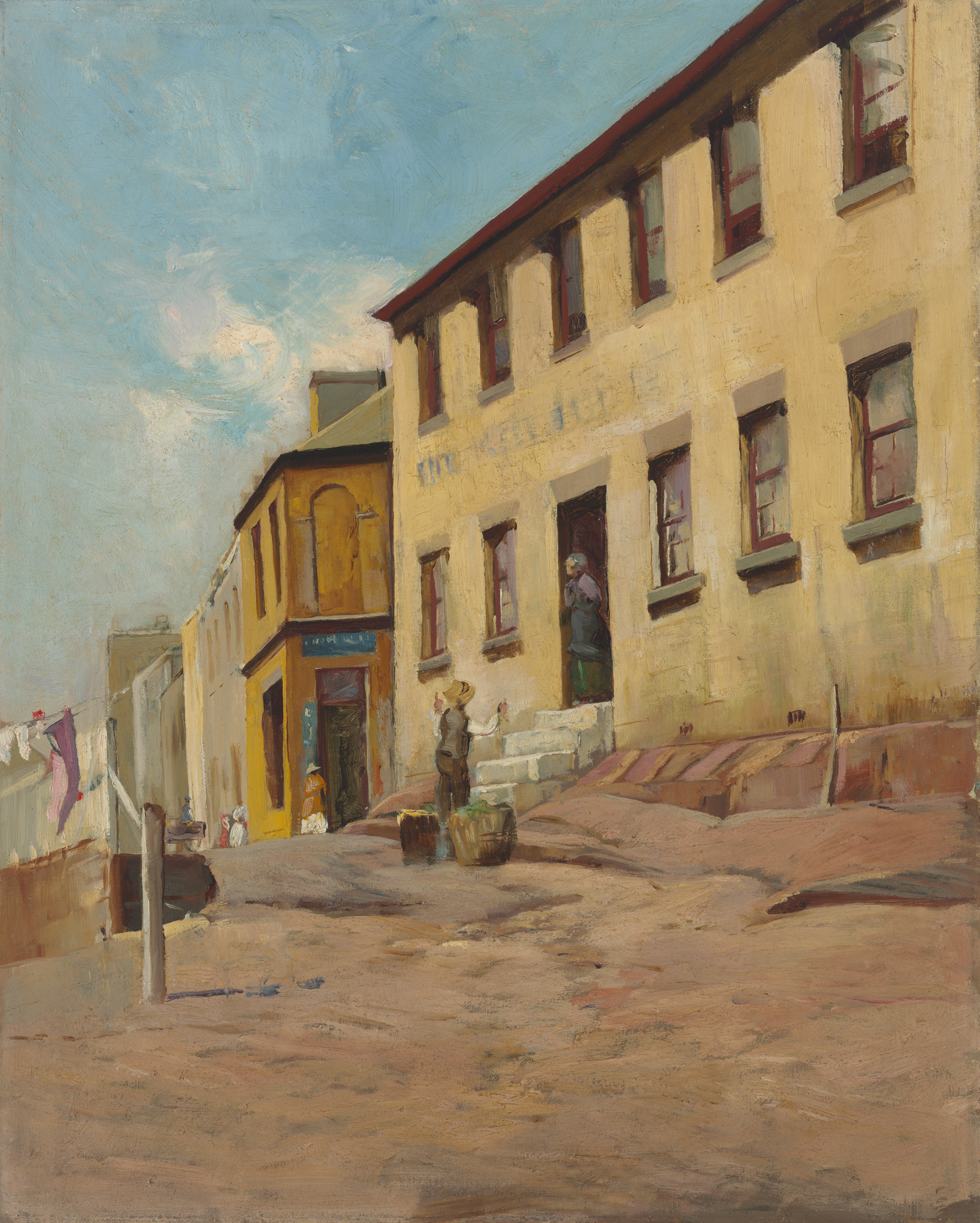
The Sailors Return Hotel, Sydney, c. 1902, by Sydney Long, State Library of New South Wales

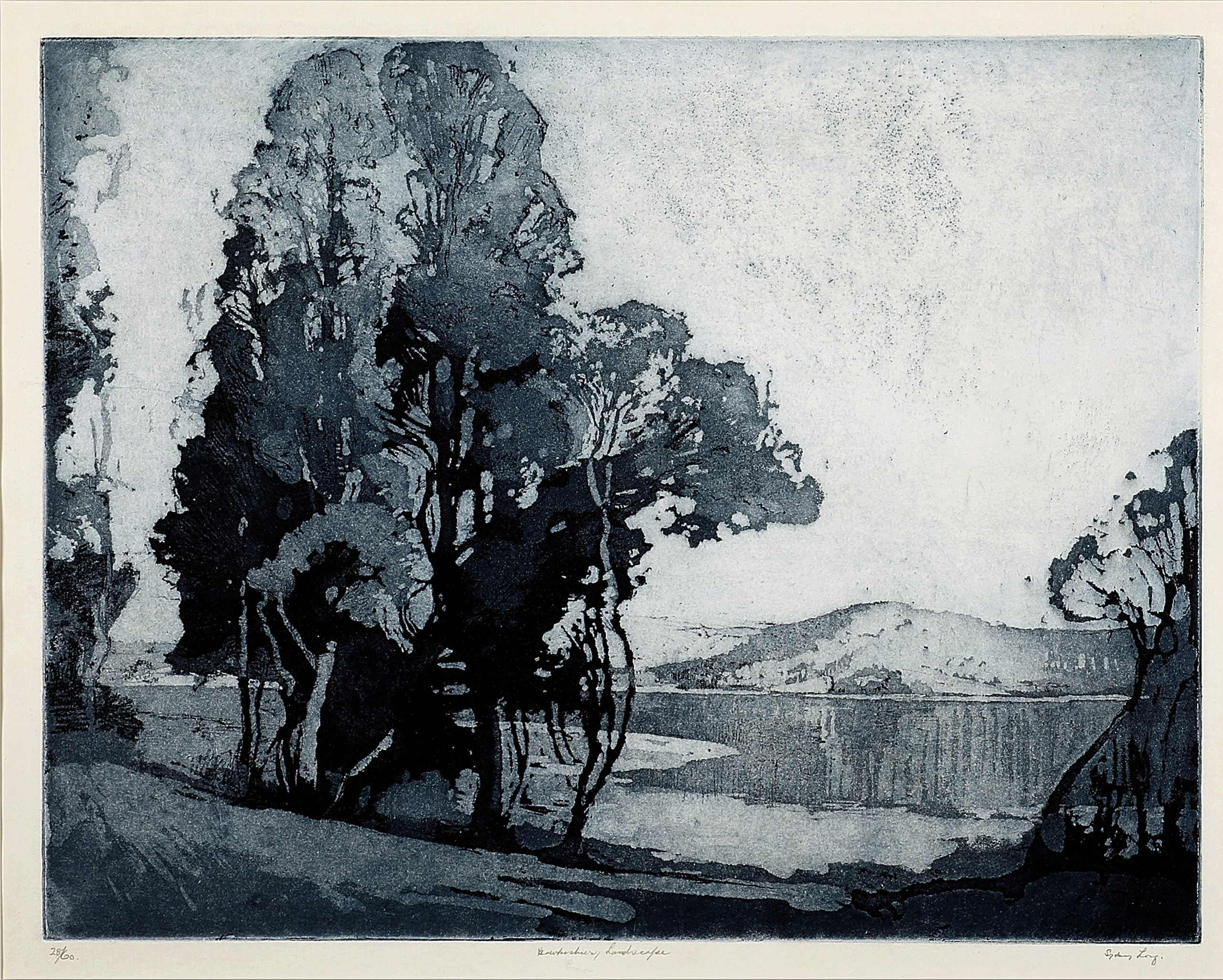
Hawkesbury Landscape (ca. 1928). Art Gallery of South Australia

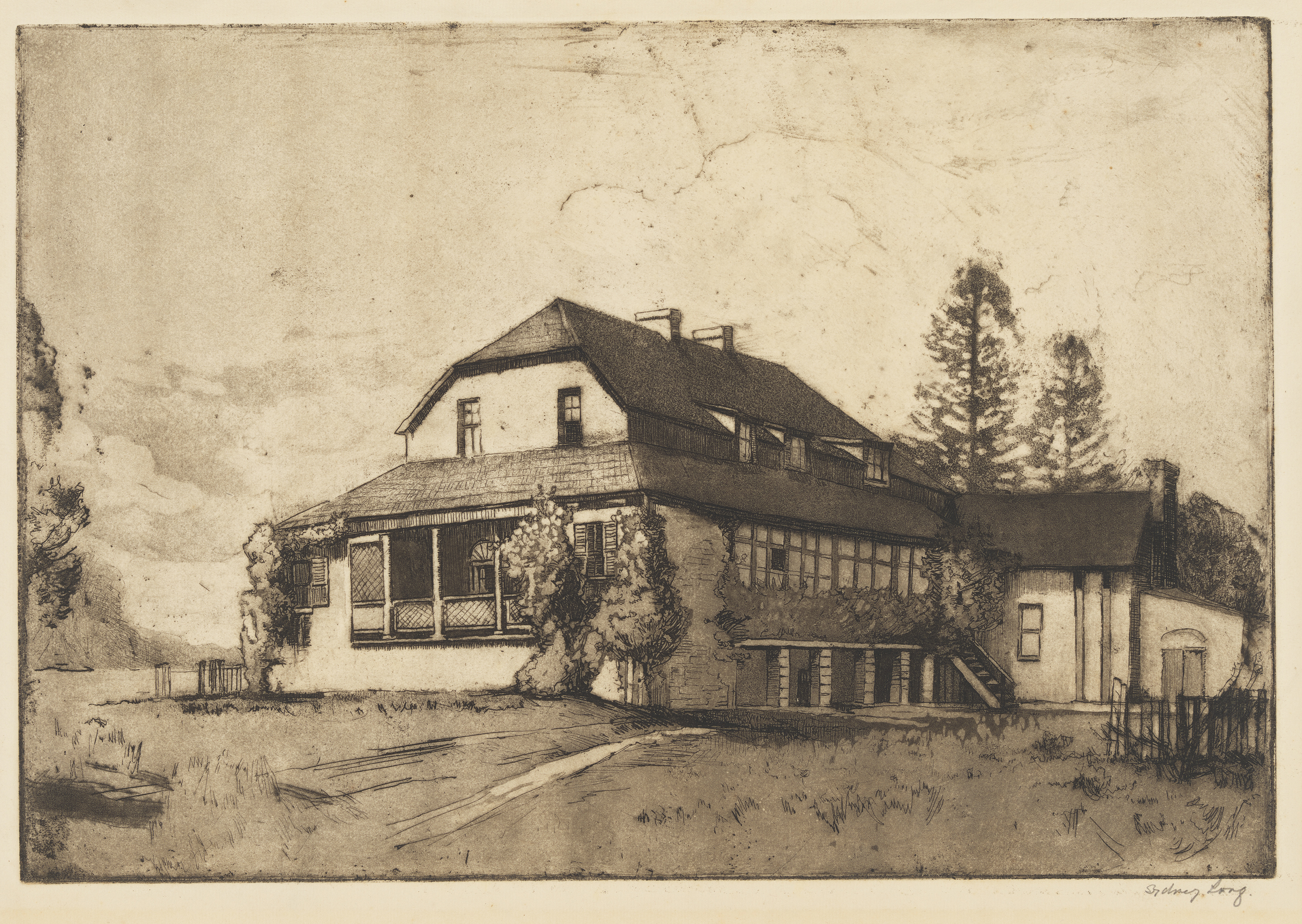
Calder House, Redfern, Sydney, ca. 1921, by Sydney Long, State Library of New South Wales

== See also ==
- Visual arts of Australia
