= Dora Serle =

Australian artist (1875–1968

- Born: Dora Beatrice Hake; 2 September 1875; Melbourne, Victoria, Australia
- Died: 10 September 1968 (aged 93); Melbourne, Victoria, Australia
- Known for: Painting
- Spouse: Percival Serle (m. 1910–1951)

Dora Beatrice Serle (1875–1968), was an Australian painter. She was the president of the Melbourne Society of Women Painters and Sculptors from 1933 to 1934.

== Biography ==
Serle was born on 2 September 1875 in Melbourne, Australia.

She studied at the National Gallery school where she was taught by Phillips Fox, Jane Sutherland, and Walter Withers. She attended the Gallery School with her sister Elsie Barlow.

In 1902 Serle travelled to Paris, France, where she was exposed to the Impressionists, which influenced her subsequent work.

In 1910 she married the scholar Percival Serle (1871–1951). In 1922 she gave birth to their third child, Geoffrey Serle, an historian and Rhodes Scholar.

Serle was a member of the Victorian Artists Society, the Melbourne Society of Women Painters and Sculptors and the Lyceum Club.

She died on 10 September 1968 at Hawthorn, Melbourne.

Hacke Place in the Canberra suburb of Conder is named in her honour and that of her younger sister Elsie Barlow, a founder of Castlemaine Art Museum, the misspelling of their maiden name being gazetted in 1988.

== Exhibitions ==
Dora exhibited with the Victorian Artists Society, but faced the prevalent prejudice against those of her gender; of her contribution to its October 1950 Spring exhibition, critic Alan Warren offered a passing mention: "Women painters, such as Violet Mclnnes, Dora Serle, Marjorie Woolcock, Dorothy Stephen, Roma Ward, Lesley Sinclair and Mary Macqueen have produced some competent pictures in their respective spheres."

- 1943, from 1 December; Inclusion in a group show of ninety-one paintings and etchings with Arnold Shore, Max Meldrum, John Rowell, Jas. Quinn, John Farmer, Mary Hurry, Allan Jordan, Margaret Pestell, Dora Wilson, Isabel Tweddle, Aileen Dent, Murray Griffin, Geo. Colville, and Victor Cog. Hawthorn Library.

== Legacy ==
Serle's paintings are in the collections of the National Gallery of Australia and the National Gallery of Victoria.
