= Philip Mennell =

Australian journalist and writer (1851–1905)

Philip Dearman Mennell FRGS (10 March 1851 – 19 October 1905) was an English-born encyclopaedist, journalist and newspaper owner, active in Australia, author of the Dictionary of Australasian Biography (1892).

== Early life ==
Mennell was born in Newcastle upon Tyne in England, the fourth son of George Mennell, a cokemaker, and his wife Hannah, née Tuke. Philip was the grandson of Samuel Tuke, the Quaker philanthropist and mental-health reformer.

Mennell was privately educated and published Lord John Manners, a Political Biography in 1872. Mennell studied law, was admitted as a solicitor, but soon afterward migrated to Victoria, Australia.

== Career ==
From May 1877, Mennell printed and published the Bairnsdale Advertiser, becoming part-owner in 1879. In 1882, Mennell left for Melbourne and worked for The Age as acting sub-editor and leader-writer.

Mennell returned to London in 1883 and represented The Age's cable syndicate. In 1891 Mennell revisited Australia as special correspondent for the Daily Chronicle. The following year he published his Dictionary of Australasian Biography, sub-titled Comprising Notices of Eminent Colonists From the Inauguration of Responsible Government Down to the Present Time, which contained over 1500 entries. Mennell also published The Coming Colony in 1892, on Western Australia.

Mennell was also editor-proprietor of the British Australasian and New Zealand Mail from December 1892 until shortly before his death. He died in London, England, on 19 October 1905.

== Works ==
- Philip Mennell (1892), The Coming Colony: practical notes on Western Australia (1st ed.), London: Hutchinson Heinemann, Wikidata Q19082708
- Philip Mennell (1892), The Dictionary of Australasian Biography: comprising notice of eminent colonists from the inauguration of responsible government down to the present time [1855-1892], London: Hutchinson Heinemann, Wikidata Q19084840
