= Percival Serle =

Australian writer (1871–1951)

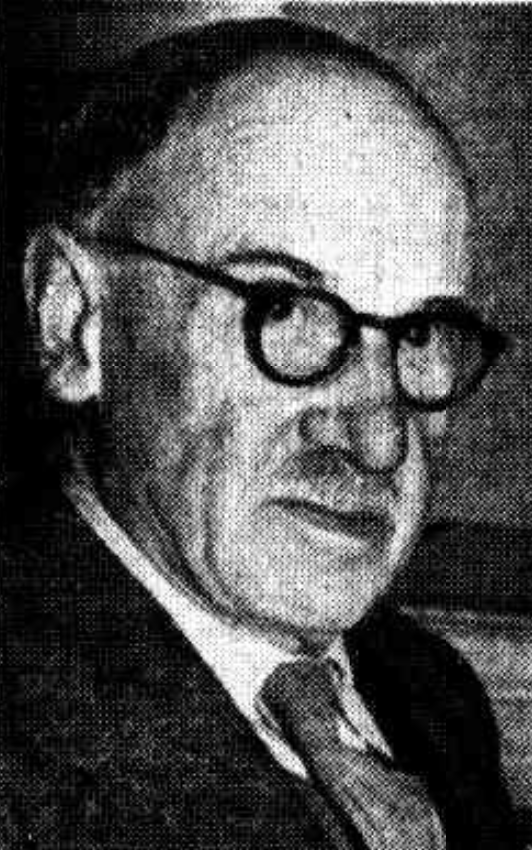
- Percival Serle (1871–1951), author of Dictionary of Australian Biography, taken around 1949
- Born: 18 July 1871; Elsternwick, Victoria, Australia
- Died: 16 December 1951 (aged 80); Hawthorn, Victoria, Australia
- Occupations: Biographer and bibliographer
- Spouse: Dora Serle (m. 1910–1951)
- Children: Geoffrey Serle (son)
- Writing career
- Notable awards: ALS Gold Medal

Percival Serle (18 July 1871 – 16 December 1951) was an Australian biographer and bibliographer. He was the author of the Dictionary of Australian Biography (1949).

== Early life ==
Serle was born in the Melbourne suburb of Elsternwick, Victoria, to English parents who had migrated as children.

== Career ==
For many years, he worked in a life assurance office before in November 1910, becoming chief clerk and accountant at the University of Melbourne.

Serle ran a second-hand bookshop during the depression; was guide-lecturer at the National Gallery of Victoria; curator of the Art Museum of the Gallery; and member of the council of the Victorian Artists Society. He was also president of the Australian Literature Society.

== Publications ==
Serle's publications included an edition, with notes, of A Song to David and Other Poems by the 18th-century English poet, Christopher Smart; A Bibliography of Australasian Poetry and Verse: Australia and New Zealand; An Australasian Anthology (with 'Furnley Maurice' and R. H. Croll); A selection of Poems by Furnley Maurice; Dictionary of Australian Biography; and A Primer of Collecting.

The Dictionary took more than twenty years to complete and contains more than one thousand biographies of prominent Australians or people closely connected with Australia. Serle commented in the Preface: "I have endeavoured to make the book worthy of its subject. It would have been better could I have spent another five years on it, but at seventy-five years of age one realizes there is a time to make an end." He was awarded the Australian Literature Society Gold Medal for 1949 for the work.

== Personal life and death ==
He married artist Dora Beatrice Hake on 29 March 1910. They were to have three children. One son, Alan Geoffrey Serle, was selected as 1947 Victorian Rhodes scholar.

Serle died on 16 December 1951, at his home in Hawthorn, Victoria, aged 80. His wife, the artist Dora Serle, a daughter, and two sons survived him.

== General References ==
- The Oxford Companion to Australian Literature (Second Edition, 1994).
