= Who's Who in Australia =

Australian biographical dictionary

Who's Who in Australia (WWIA) is an Australian biographical dictionary first published by Fred Johns in 1906 as Johns's Notable Australians. It is used as a resource for summary information on prominent Australians. WWIA is part of a series of reference works that includes Who's Who of Australian Women and Who's Who in Business in Australia.

== History ==
Who's Who in Australia began as the vision of South Australian sub-editor Fred Johns. Following his arrival in Australia in 1884, Johns compiled a volume of biographies of notable living compatriots. First published in 1906, Johns's Notable Australians contained nearly 1,100 entries. Subsequent editions were published in 1908, 1912, 1913, 1914 and 1922, before the book first appeared as Who's Who in Australia in 1927.

Fred Johns died in December 1932, bequeathing £1,500 to the University of Adelaide to found a scholarship in biography.

From 2003, the directory was published online by Crown Content Pty Ltd and later by ConnectWeb, a subsidiary of AAP which became the company Mediality.The company announced in 2022 that, after 122 years, it would cease the printed edition that year.

== Criteria for inclusion ==
- Who's Who in Australia lists persons assessed by the editors as having contributed "to Australian life on a national or international level".
- Who's Who of Australian Women lists women with significant achievements in business, government, the professions, arts, sport, etc.
- Who's Who in Business in Australia lists persons assessed as significant business leaders.

== Cumulative editions ==
The National Library of Australia holds copies and reviews of Fred Johns's publications (1906–1922), successors of 1927–28, 1933–34, 1935, 1938, 1941, 1944, 1947, 1950 and 1955, and subsequent series which were triennial (1959–1988) and annual (1991–present).
