= Fred Johns =

American-born Australian journalist and biographer (1868-1932)

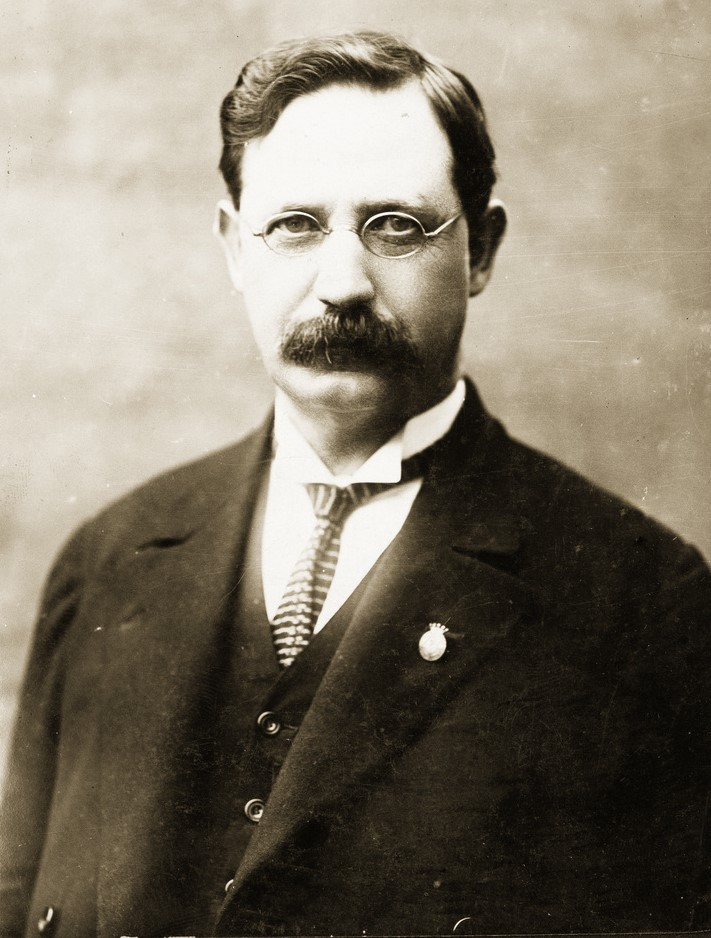

Frederick Johns (22 March 1868 – 3 December 1932) was an American-born Australian journalist and biographer.

Johns was born in Houghton, Michigan, United States, son of Cornishman Ezekiel Johns of Cornwall, UK. His father Ezekiel died while Fred was still an infant, whereupon he was taken to Cornwall, England. After leaving school, he emigrated to Australia in 1884 at the age of 16. He published Johns's Notable Australians in 1906. A later edition appeared in 1908; from 1912 to 1914 it appeared as Fred Johns's Annual. In 1922 it was revived as Who's Who in the Commonwealth of Australia, and then in 1927 as Who's Who in Australia.

Johns died at Adelaide aged 64.
