= Jessie Mackintosh =

Australian artist

- Born: 10 December 1891; North Adelaide, South Australia
- Died: 15 June 1958 (aged 66); Hawthorn, Victoria
- Education: National Gallery School
- Style: Modernism
- Movement: George Bell School

Jessie Mackintosh (10 December 1891 – 15 June 1958) was an Australian artist and photographer.

== Early life ==
Mackintosh was born Jessie Macqueen Mackintosh in North Adelaide, South Australia to Donald Macqueen Mackintosh and Maud Augusta Mackintosh (née Wadham). She had an older sister Gwendoline who died at eleven years old, and two younger siblings, Donald born in 1893, and Kathleen born in 1895. The family moved to Victoria and was living in Hawthorn as early as 1903. Her father worked as a tailor in Howie Court, Collins Street.

She first attended the National Gallery School in 1915–1916. She studied there again as well as at the Bell-Shore School of Creative Art from the late 1920s to the mid-1930s. A trained singer who also practiced as a photographer, Mackintosh had a photograph published in the Bulletin as early as 1919, and her photograph of fellow artist Jo Sweatman was published in the Herald in 1926. She studied with George Bell at Selborne Road in 1924 and moved with him to the Bourke Street School in the 1930s. Her enthusiasm for Bell's teaching led her to convince fellow Gallery School students to attend. Bell himself gave her the nickname "Messy Jackintosh."

== Career ==
Mackintosh was part of a group called the New Melbourne Art Club including her close friend Sybil Craig, Constance Stokes, Peggy Crombie, and Helen Ogilvie. Like their fellow female artists of the time, Sybil and Jessie taught themselves the linocut technique from Claude Flight's 1927 book Lino-cuts. A Hand-Book of Linoleum-Cut Colour Printing as well as studying design under Robert Timmings at the Melbourne Technical College.

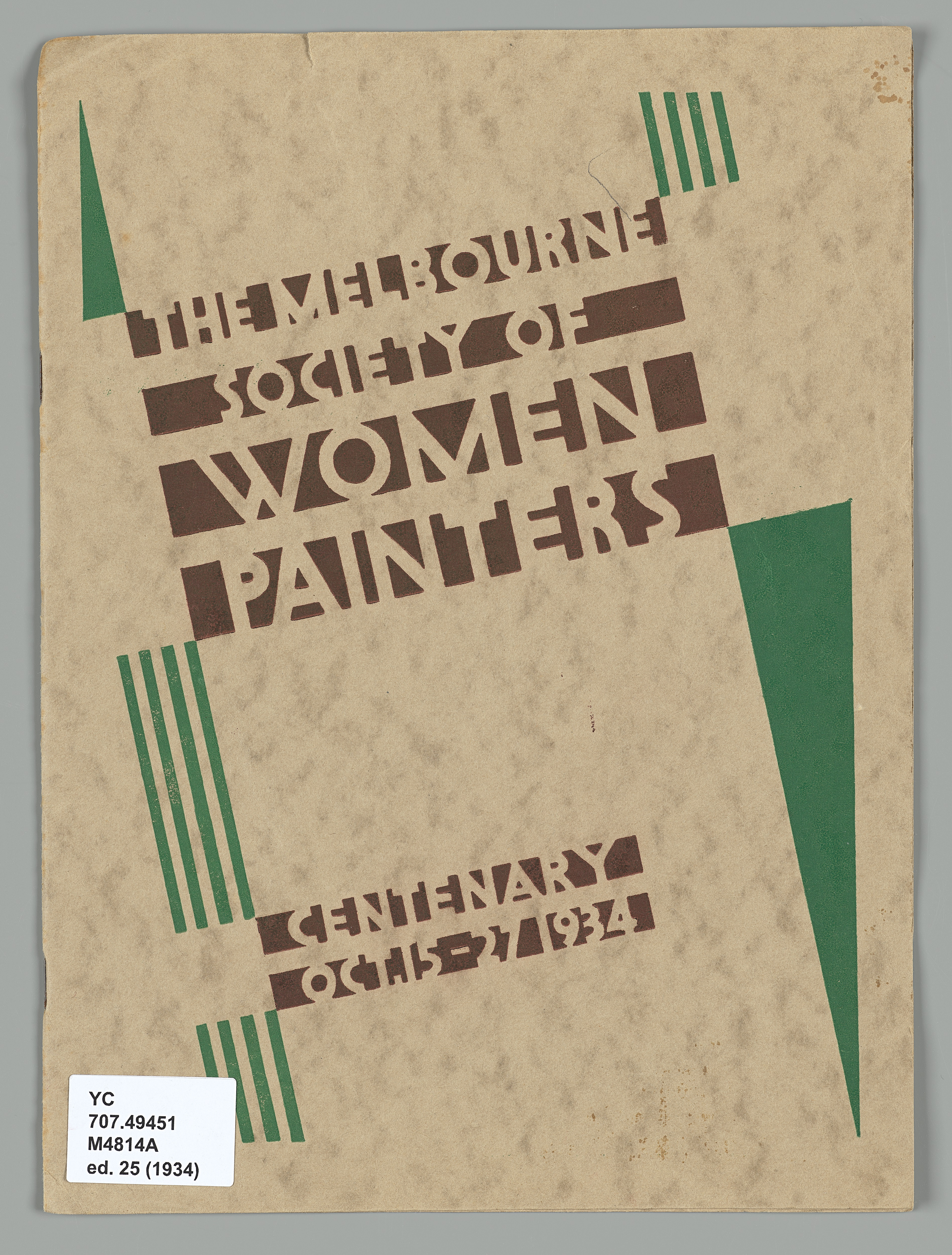
The cover of the Melbourne Society of Women Painters 1934 exhibition catalogue designed by Jessie Mackintosh

She experimented with many techniques and styles throughout her career, from the hand-coloured linocut Unloading in the 1930s to the painting Harvesters in 1946. Both works reflect Mackintosh's interest in depicting the working class, whether in the city or the fields. Women at work were observed in her 1934 portrait Patchwork of fellow artist Constance Coleman, and 1938's linocut The Tiresome Visitor of a woman washing.

Her first known exhibition was with the Victorian Artists Society in 1932. The New Melbourne Art Club's first exhibition was the following year and Bell's influence is noted describing her studies of flowers as "flamboyantly colourful." In 1935 was her first exhibition with the Melbourne Society of Women Painters and Sculptors (MSWPS) for whom she'd serve as secretary, assistant secretary, and treasurer between 1951 and 1957. She provided a radical cover design for their 1934 exhibition catalogue that reflected her modern influence, rejecting the impression that the society was just a group of "ladies." Indeed, MSWPS was flush with fellow pupils of Bell such as Marjorie Woolcock, Maidie McGowan, Anne Montgomery, and Mary Macqueen, to name just a few.

With friend Craig she would go on painting excursions, travelling to Black Rock and north of the city to paint landscapes. When exhibiting with the New Melbourne Art Club in 1937 her landscapes were described as "lively, vital, and show[ing] capacity for design." A true working artist, Mackintosh also found time to illustrate children's board games Race Round Australia (1941), Corroboree (1943) and Discovery (1945) for John Sands.

While she lived most of her life at her family's home in Hawthorn Mackintosh also spent time living in the Dandenongs. Her tragic death occurred when she was hit by a car near her house. Close friend Sybil said about Jessie: "I was always keen on Jessie's work. She was a fine draughtswoman – very able – and a good colourist. She wanted to be a modern and I came to modernism through her."

== Legacy ==
Jessie Mackintosh is best known for her linocuts. She has multiple works in the National Gallery of Victoria's collection which were acquired at a joint exhibition with Marjorie Woolcock as well as in the National Gallery of Australia, Geelong Art Gallery, Castlemaine Art Museum, Mornington Peninsula Regional Gallery, and the Art Gallery of Ballarat.

== Exhibitions ==
- Victorian Artists Society spring exhibition. East Melbourne, 1932.
- Melbourne Society of Women Painters. Athenaeum Gallery, 1932.
- New Melbourne Art Club. Sedon Gallery, 1933.
- Women Artists in Australia: a Representative Exhibition. Education Department Galleries, 1934.
- New Melbourne Art Club annual exhibition. Athenaeum Gallery, 1934.
- New Melbourne Art Club third annual exhibition. Athenaeum Gallery, 1935.
- Victorian Artists Society. 1935.
- Melbourne Society of Women Painters. Athenaeum Gallery, 1935.
- New Melbourne Art Club annual exhibition. Athenaeum Gallery, 1936.
- New Melbourne Art Club fifth annual exhibition. Athenaeum Gallery, 1937.
- Melbourne Society of Women Painters annual exhibition. Athenaeum Gallery, 1937.
- Arts and Crafts Society. Albany Court, 1938.
- Herald Exhibition of Outstanding Paintings of 1937. Athenaeum Gallery, 1938.
- New Melbourne Art Club sixth annual exhibition. Athenaeum Gallery, 1938.
- Melbourne Society of Women Painters 29th exhibition. Athenaeum Gallery, 1938.
- Art Union for Bush Fire Fund exhibition. Athenaeum Gallery, 1939.
- New Melbourne Art Club seventh annual exhibition. Athenaeum Gallery, 1939.
- Melbourne Society of Women Painters annual exhibition. Athenaeum Gallery, 1939.
- George Bell School students exhibition. Athenaeum Gallery, 1939.
- Red Cross relief exhibition. Athenaeum Gallery, 1940.
- New Melbourne Art Club. Athenaeum Gallery, 1940.
- Melbourne Society of Women Painters annual exhibition, 1941.
- New Melbourne Art Club. Kozminsky's Gallery, 1941.
- Women Artists Watercolour and Drawings. Athenaeum Gallery, 1943.
- Jessie Mackintosh and Marjorie Woolcock. Athenaeum Gallery, 1946.
- Melbourne Society of Women Painters. Athenaeum Gallery, 1946.
- Melbourne Society of Women Painters annual exhibition. Athenaeum Gallery, 1947.
- Women artists Group exhibition. Melbourne Book Club Gallery, 1949.
- Melbourne Society of Women Painters 40th annual exhibition. Tye's Gallery, 1949.
- Melbourne Society of Women Painters 41st annual exhibition. Athenaeum Gallery, 1950.
- Victorian Artists Society annual spring exhibition. Albert Street Gallery, 1951.
- Melbourne Society of Women Painters 42nd annual exhibition. Athenaeum Gallery, 1951.
- Melbourne Society of Women Painters 44th annual exhibition. Athenaeum Gallery, 1953.
- Melbourne Society of Women Painters Christmas exhibition. Tye's Gallery, 1953.
- The Herald Art Show. Treasury Gardens, 1953.
- Victorian Artists Society autumn exhibition. Albert Street Gallery, 1954.
- Melbourne Society of Women Painters autumn exhibition. Tye's Gallery, 1954.
- Melbourne Society of Women Painters 45th annual exhibition. Athenaeum Gallery, 1954.
- The Printmakers Mainly of the Thirties. Important Women Artists, 1977.
