= Betty Paterson =

Australian commercial artist, cartoonist and illustrator

Betty Paterson MBE
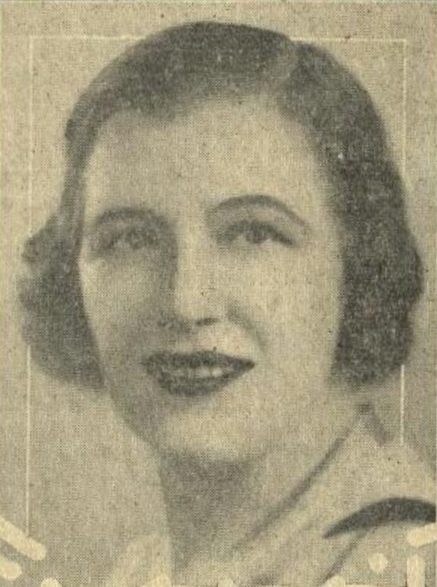
- Paterson in 1946
- Born: Elizabeth Deans Paterson; 1894; Carlton, Victoria, Australia
- Died: 5 July 1970 (aged 75–76); Middle Park, Victoria, Victoria, Australia
- Known for: Cartoon, book illustration, children's portraiture

Elizabeth Deans Paterson MBE (1894 – 5 July 1970) was an Australian commercial artist, cartoonist and illustrator. She was best known as Betty Paterson and for her pictures of babies and young children, but also wrote poetry and short stories for children, sometimes as 'Blue Ribbon'.

== Early life and education ==
Elizabeth Deans Paterson was born in Carlton, Victoria in 1894, daughter of Elizabeth Leslie (née Deans) and artist Hugh Paterson, who encouraged her interest in art. Her older sister Esther Paterson (1892–1971) was also a commercial artist, illustrator and cartoonist. Their uncle was Scottish-born landscape painter John Ford Paterson.

Educated to a secondary level in St Kilda at European-style finishing school Oberwyl, formerly Etloe Hall, in Burnett Street, run by Swiss art patron Madame Elise Pfund, Paterson studied painting beside William Beckwith McInnes at the National Gallery of Victoria art school over 1907–12 under Bernard Hall and Frederick McCubbin, who was a neighbour of her family.

Paterson sent her first drawing to The Bulletin in response to a bet by cartoonist David Low. Her drawing was published, she won the bet and began her career contributing illustrations to magazines.

At the time of her first marriage in 1923 to Kenneth Fossie Newman, Paterson had already made a name for herself for her drawings and portraits of children. She was divorced by her husband in 1931 and given custody of their daughter, Barbara, who later became an artist.

== Commercial artist ==
By the mid-1920s Paterson and her sister Esther had established themselves as commercial artists who were "the cleverest designers in Australia" of posters, illustrated books, calendars and Christmas cards. In 1922 they held a joint exhibition in Queen's Hall, Melbourne which was opened by Prime Minister Billy Hughes. Her drawings of young children were noted for their "fetching impertinence". Her 1931 solo exhibition was opened by the Melbourne lord mayor, Harold Gengoult Smith, while in 1935 the lady mayoress, Mrs A. G. Wales, did the honours.

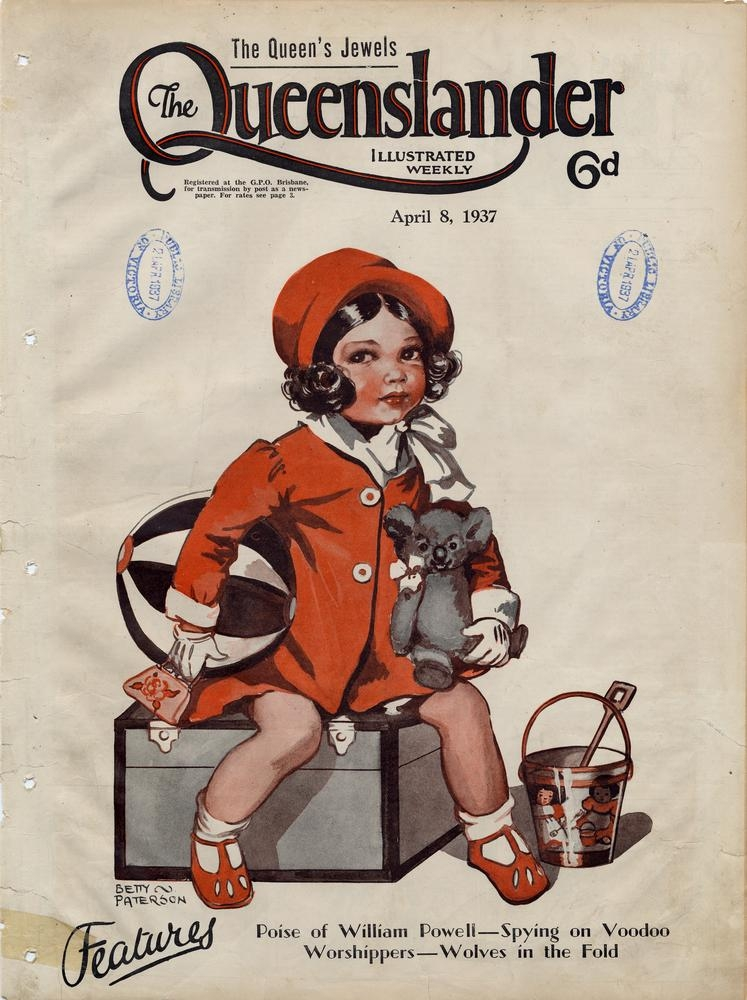
Illustrated front cover from The Queenslander, April 8, 1937

== Portraits ==
Paterson's work was published in many magazines, including The Australian Home Beautiful, The Australian Woman's Mirror, The New Triad, and The Bulletin. In the 1935 The Australian Woman's Mirror awarded an original drawing by Paterson each week to the person who made the best original contribution to the magazine.

Paterson competed in 1938 for the Archibald Prize with her painting The yellow gloves of sister Esther, purchased by art patron Howard Hinton, and which is amongst a collection bequeathed by him to the New England Regional Art Museum. A portrait of Paterson by her former art school colleague WB McInnes, held in the Art Gallery of NSW, was one of four entries by McInnes in the 1926 Archibald Prize and the fifth of his paintings to win it; while others by her sister Esther were finalists for the Archibald Prize in 1938 and 1939.

== Later life ==
In 1952 Paterson married Albion Wiltshire. Paterson died on 5 July 1970 at Middle Park in Victoria.

== Honours ==
Paterson was made a Member of the Order of the British Empire in 1966 for her service to art and the community.

== Collections ==
- National Gallery of Victoria
- New England Regional Art Museum
