= Esther Paterson =

Australian artist (1892–1971)

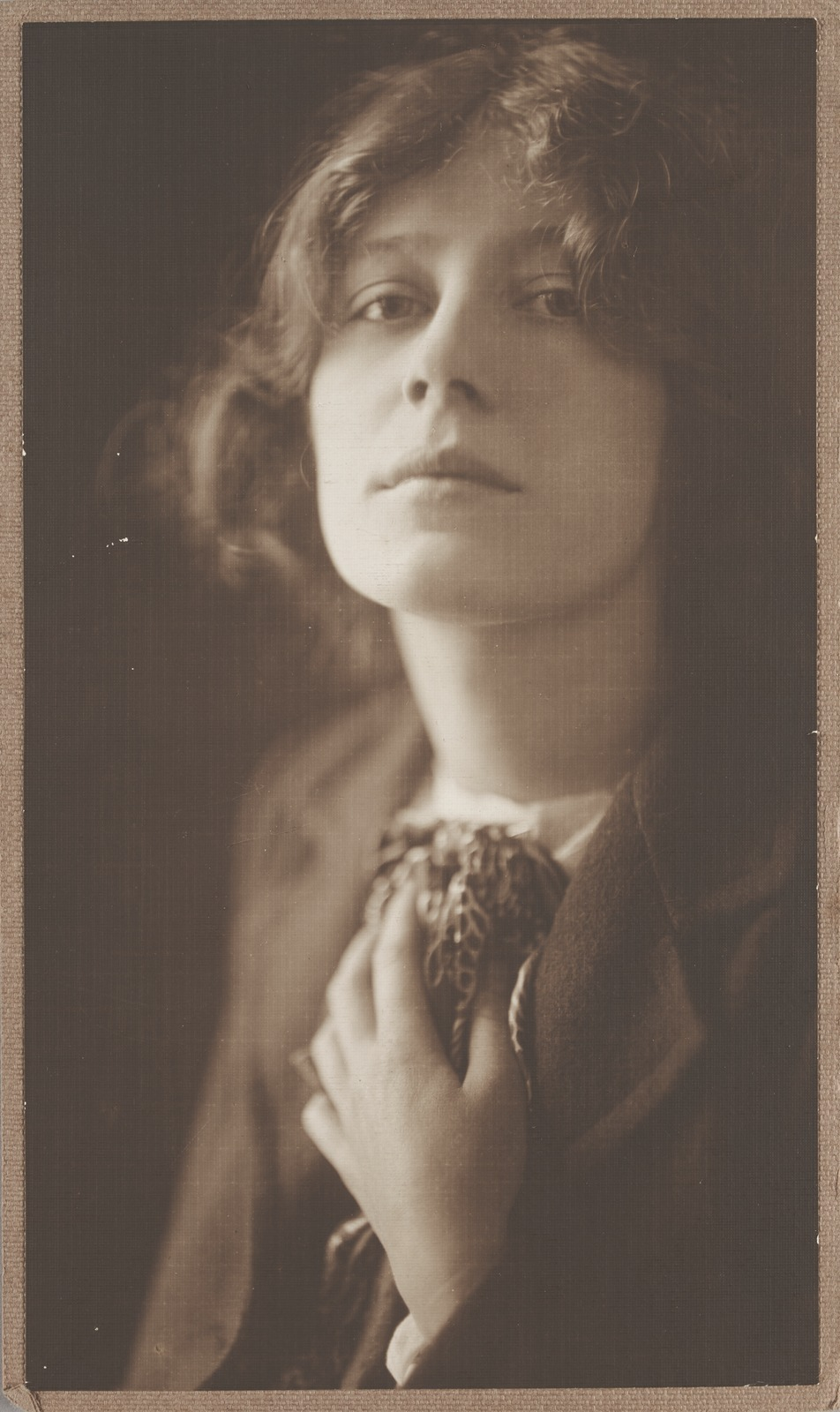
- Born: 5 February 1892; Carlton, Victoria, Australia
- Died: 8 August 1971 (aged 79); Middle Park, Victoria, Australia
- Education: National Gallery Art School
- Known for: Book illustration, Portraiture, Cartoon
- Spouse: George Hermon Gill

Esther Paterson Gill (5 February 1892 – 8 August 1971) was an Australian artist, book-illustrator and cartoonist.

== Early years ==
Paterson was born in Carlton, Victoria, the second child born to Scottish emigrants Hugh and Elizabeth Leslie (née Deans) Paterson. She was the niece of eminent landscape painter John Ford Paterson. Paterson grew up around artists, actors, and other creatives, and lived next door to Annie and Frederick McCubbin. She began her education at Oberwly School, St. Kilda. At age thirteen, Paterson studied painting at the National Gallery of Victoria School from 1907 to 1912.

Educated to a secondary level in St Kilda at European-style finishing school Oberwyl, formerly Etloe Hall, in Burnett Street, run by Swiss art patron Madame Elise Pfund, Paterson studied painting beside William Beckwith McInnes at the National Gallery of Victoria art school over 1907-12 under Bernard Hall and Frederick McCubbin, who was a neighbour of her family.

== Career ==
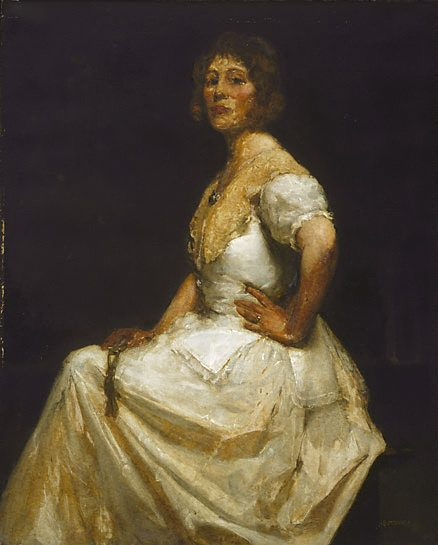
Silk and lace, 1926, William Beckwith McInnes

Paterson was publishing her illustrations while still at school with work featured in The Woman in 1908 and cartoons appearing in the Sydney Bulletin throughout 1912. This led to regular appearances in Melbourne Punch, the Argus, and other papers and journals. Her work saw her labelled by the Sun as "Melbourne's Poster Girl."

Her first book of sketches "Aussie Girls" was published in 1918 by Melbourne Publishing Company. It conveyed her ability to analyse the customs and values inherent in Melbourne society at the time. This was followed by her second book "'Me': a page from my diary" in 1919. Her talent in both illustration and poignant writings led to collaboration with writers Ethel Turner and Mary Grant Bruce, and acknowledgement from editors and publishers.

Paterson had bylines as a freelance journalist with pictorial essays in publications such as Table Talk, Home, and the Weekly Times.

Paterson nurtured the artistic talent of her younger sister Betty Paterson, who had trained as a musician at the Marshall Hall Conservatorium. Betty's drawings of babies and young children led to her also becoming a cartoonist for Punch, and the sisters even exhibited their works together. An exhibition of pictures by Esther and Betty was opened in 1922 at the Queen's Hall by then Prime Minister of Australia Billy Hughes. While the pictures were described as a "sometimes frivolous quality of humour", Esther was commended for her portraits of "Inez" and "The Purser." They were also active in helping charities during the Second World War, selling their pencil sketches at a fete in aid of Women Artists' National Service, held at Ola Cohn's East Melbourne studio.

Her work as a published illustrator was to become more prolific upon her marriage to George Hermon Gill. Gill worked as a staff writer for the Melbourne Star, the Argus, and the Herald, with Esther illustrating many of his articles.

Her portraits of soldiers both uniformed and civilian is shown at the Australian War Memorial Canberra. The National Gallery of Victoria and Geelong Art Gallery also hold some of her work. Paterson posed in her wedding dress for the 1926 Archibald Prize winning painting Silk and lace by William Beckwith McInnes, acquired by the Art Gallery of New South Wales

Paterson was the longest serving female office bearer in the Victorian Artists' Society, and a significant presence within the Melbourne Society of Women Painters and Sculptors. The Bulletin reviewing her 1931 exhibition at the Fine Art Galleries describes a "room devoted to Bulletin artist Esther Paterson...brightened by Battersea Park - here she has caught with considerable vividness a quick impression of sunlit grass with figures moving about on it. Afternoon, Essex, has something of the same evanescent quality." She showed her portraits at the 40th annual exhibition of the Society in 1949 at Tye's Gallery, Bourke Street. Fellow artists exhibited included Florence Rodway, Ludmilla Meilerts, Violet McInnes, and Mabel Pye.

In 1950 Paterson was awarded the honour of Fellow of the Royal Society of Arts, London (FRSA), showing her reach went beyond Australia to be known in England.

== Exhibitions ==
- 1931, 3 November - 17 December: Group show with John Shirlow, Allan Jordan and Charles Nuttall. Fine Art Galleries, Melbourne
- 1949, October: 40th annual exhibition of the Victorian Artists Society, Tye's Gallery, Bourke Street.

== Collections ==
National Gallery of Victoria

== Selected works ==
Aussie girls by Esther Paterson
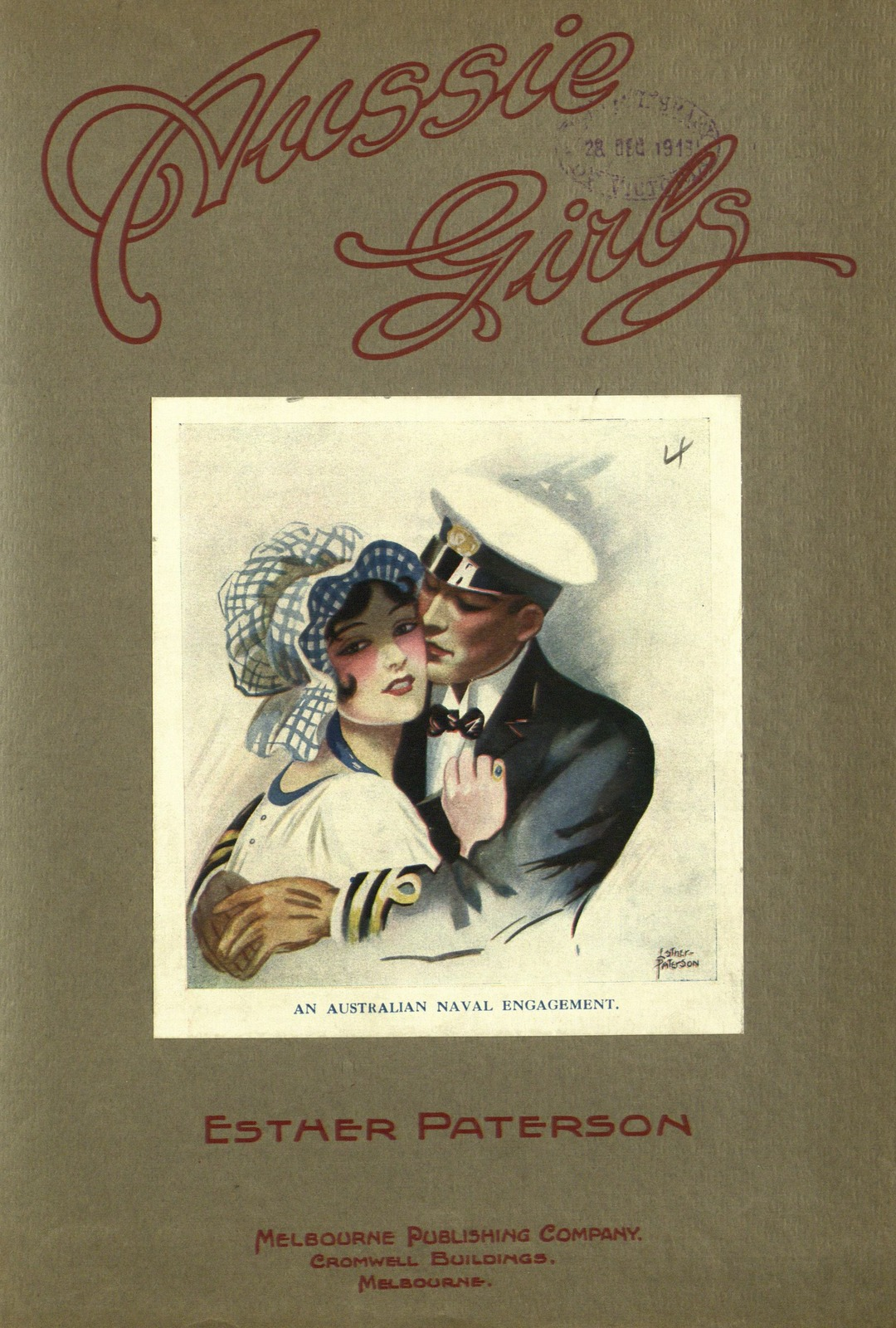
Front cover of Aussie girls

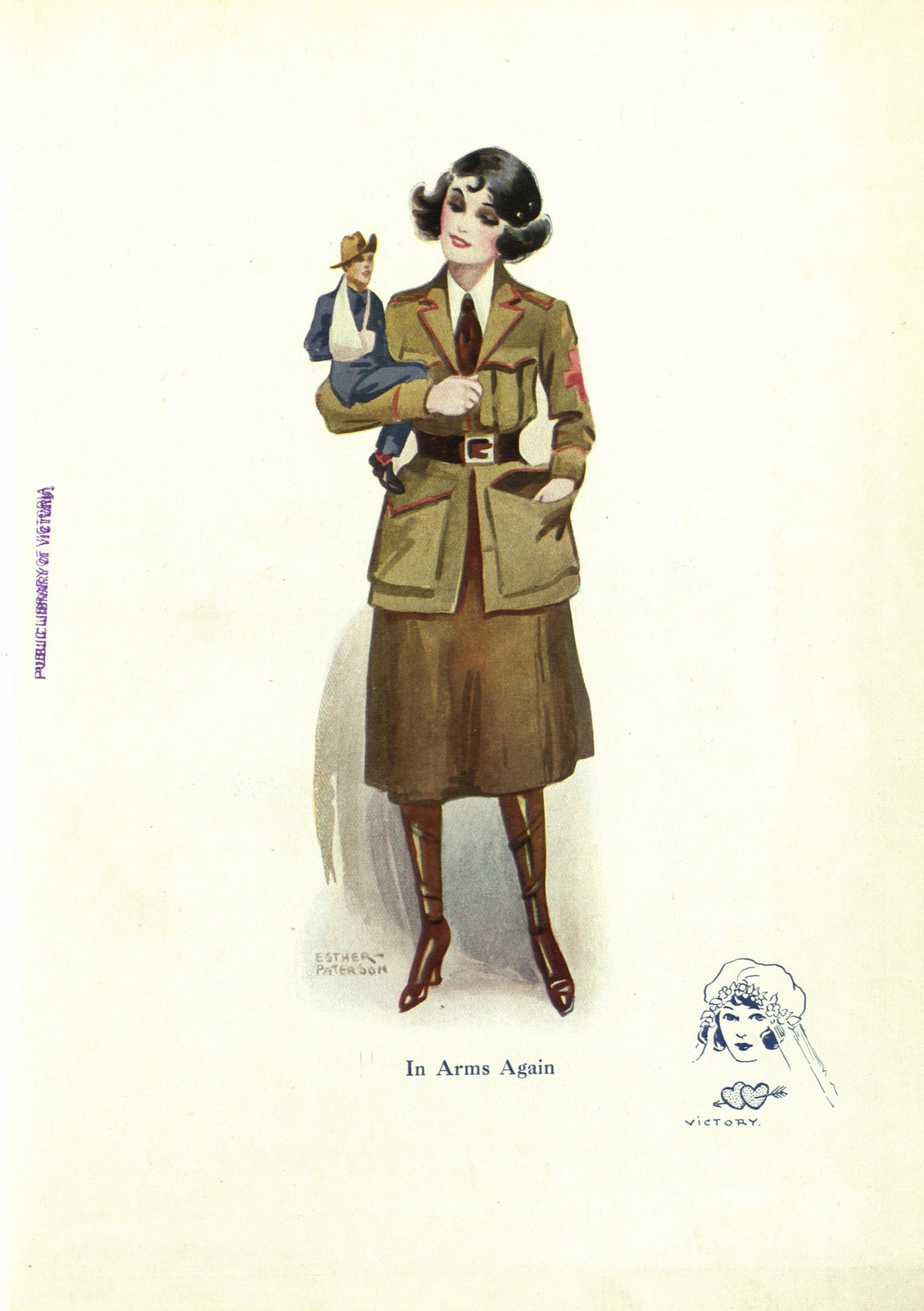
'In arms again'

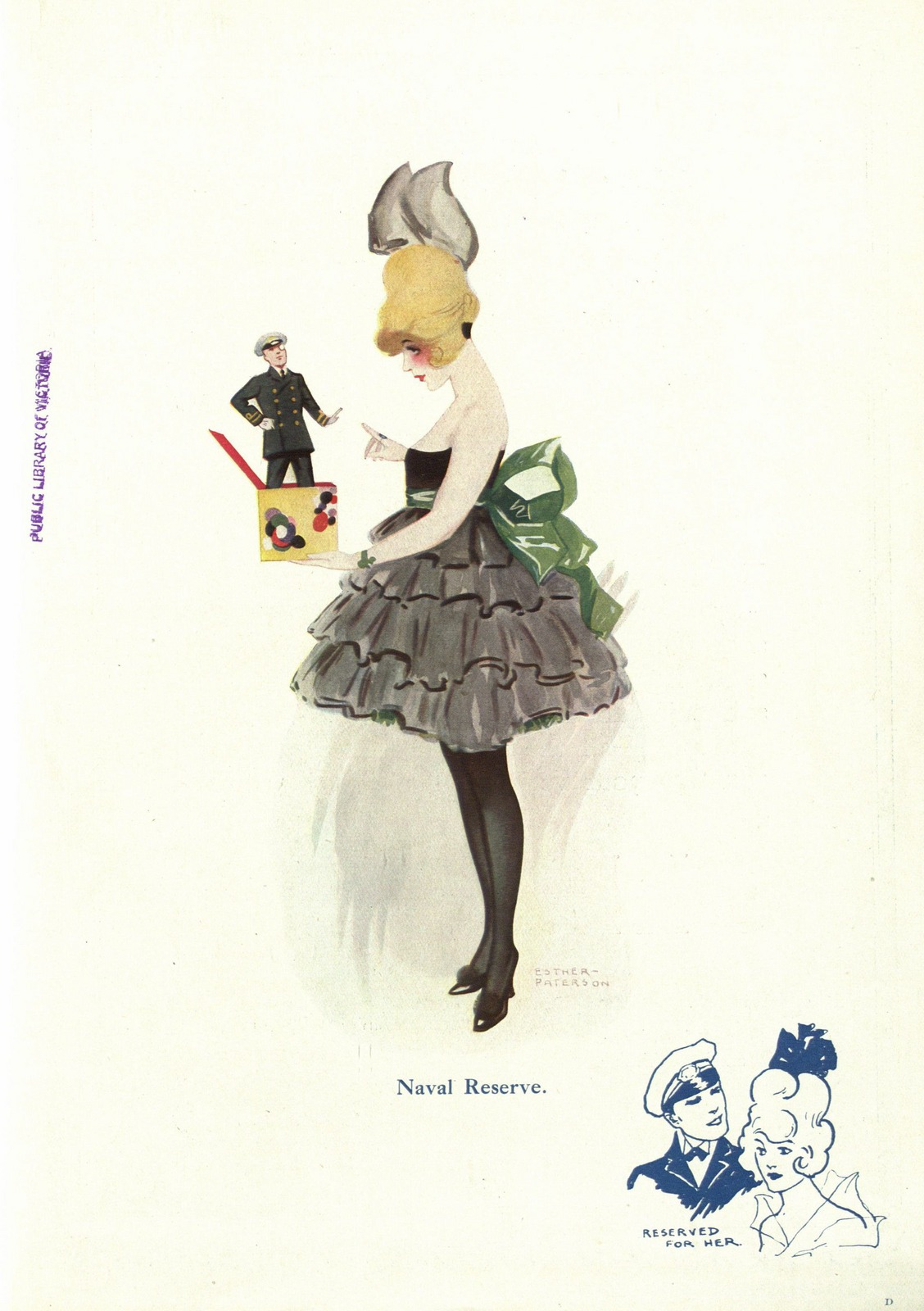
'Naval reserve'

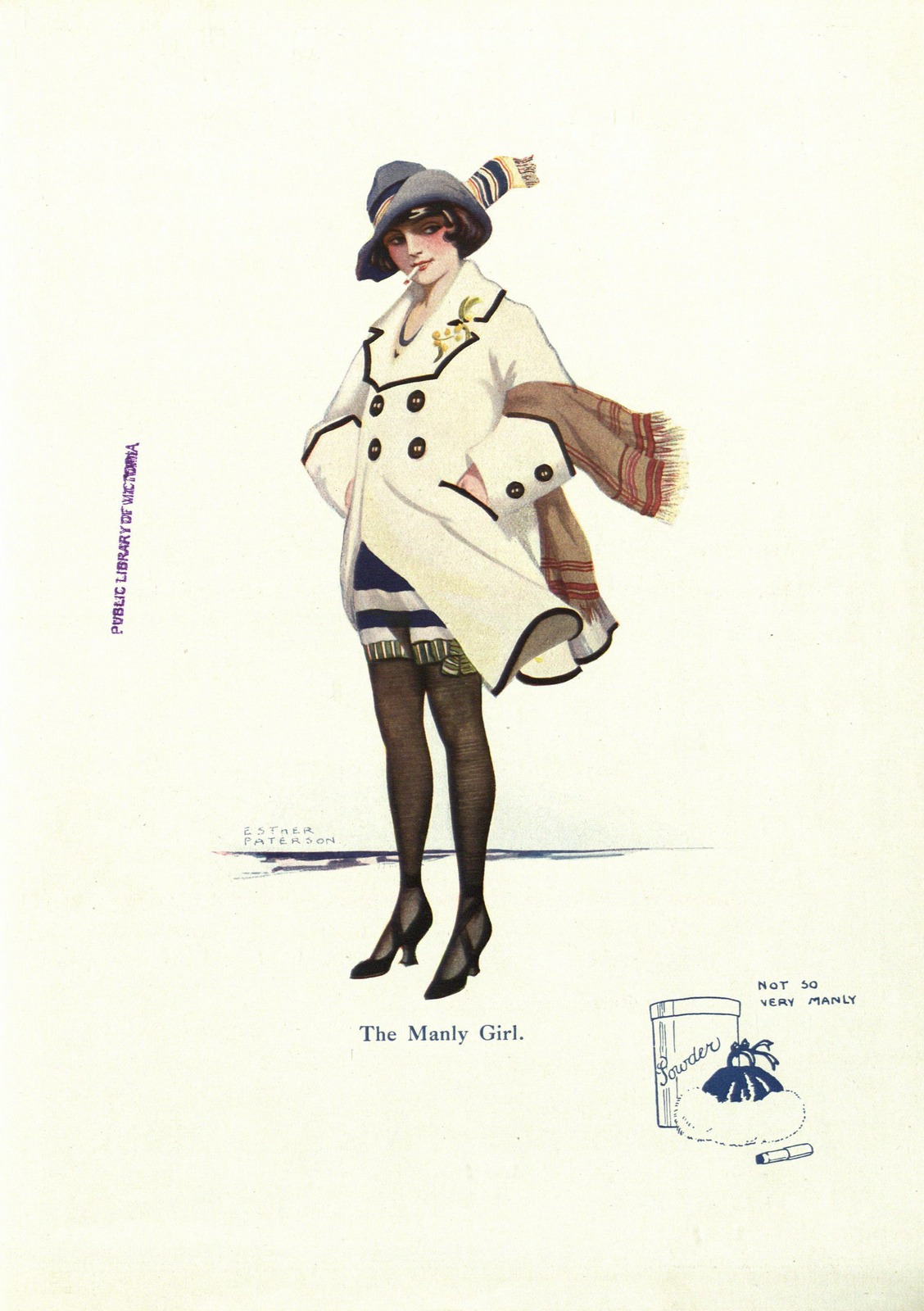
'The manly girl'

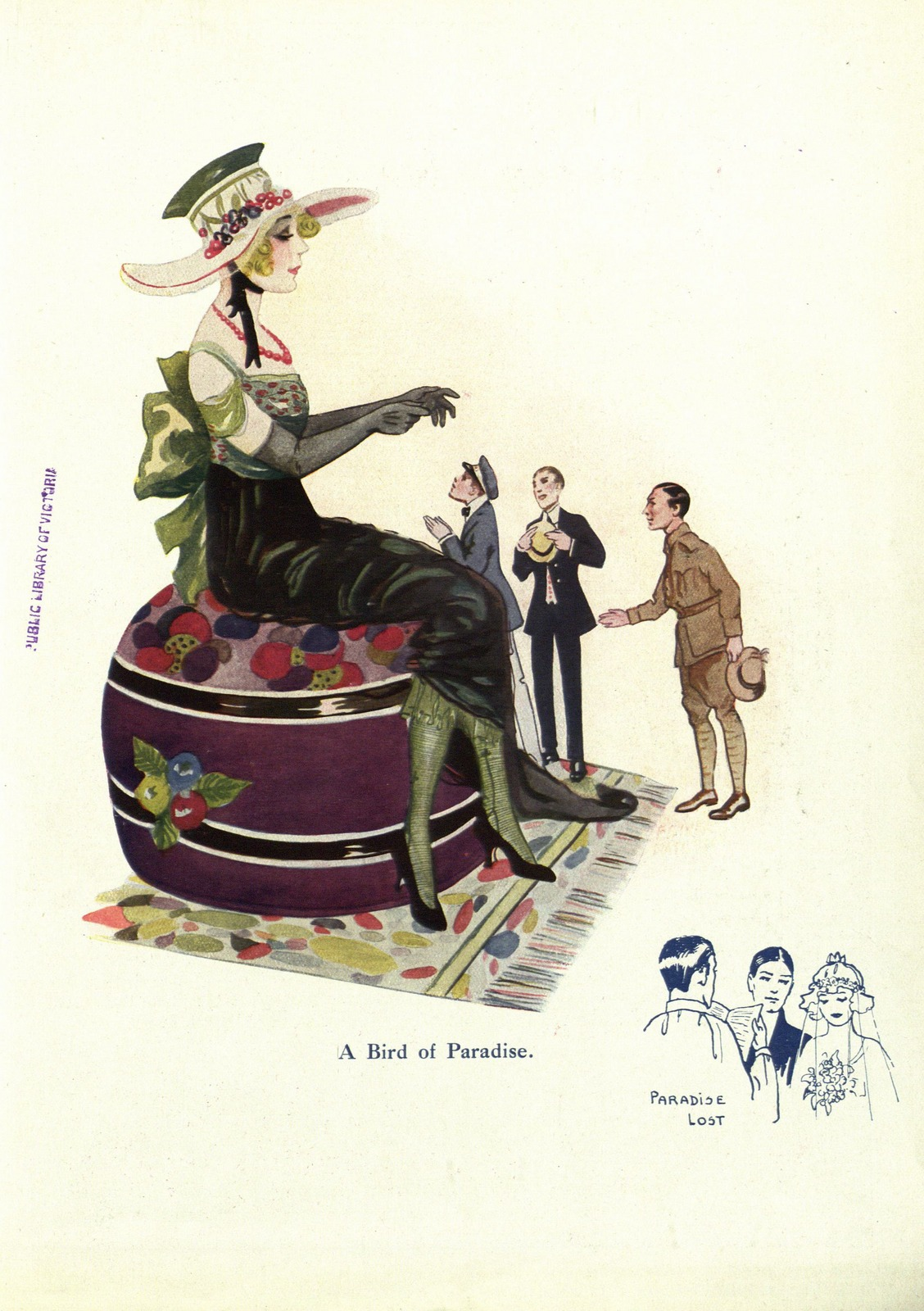
'A bird of paradise'
Images courtesy of State Library Victoria

== Publications ==
- 'Beauty in the making', Weekly Times Annual, 4 November 1916
- 'Many beaux to her string', Weekly Times Annual, 2 November 1918
- 'Past and present', Weekly Times, 27 December 1919
- 'The little Volga boy', Herald, 7 October 1922
- 'How things do change', Midlands Advertiser, 4 January 1929
- 'Companions in arms' (by J. A. Hetherington and D. H. Symmons), Table Talk, 10 July 1930
- 'The little voyagers' (with Betty Paterson), Herald, 23 December 1933
- 'Barnacle Bill' series, Australasian, 9 July; 15 October; 22 October; 17 December, 1938
- '...Nor any drop to drink', Argus, 17 February 1940
- 'The kiddies have a wonderful time in this kindergarten' (illustrated by Betty Paterson), Argus, 29 May 1943

With Hermon Gill

- 'The Browns of Bangaroo', Australasian, 28 August, 1937
- 'This pets business', Australasian, 25 September 1937
- 'The show's grim moments', Australasian, 2 October 1937
- 'Brent's last case', Australasian, 9 October 1937
- 'Bone studs and backbones', Australasian, 18 December 1937
- 'It must be done - and yet -', Australasian, 29 January 1938

With Ethel Turner

- Nicola Silver (serial), Australian Woman's Mirror
  - 9 December 1924
  - 16 December 1924
  - 23 December 1924
  - 30 December 1924
  - 6 January 1925
  - 13 January 1925
  - 20 January 1925
  - 27 January 1925
  - 3 February 1925

== Death and legacy ==
On 8 August 1971, Esther Paterson died at Middle Park and was cremated with Anglican rites. Her husband, George Hermon Gill, died two years later.
