= CAF =

CAF or caf may refer to:

== Armed forces ==
- Canadian Armed Forces (Canadian Forces), the Canadian Air Force, Army, and Navy
- Canadian Air Force, now the Royal Canadian Air Force
- Civil Armed Forces, Pakistani paramilitary forces
- Republic of China Air Force, the air force of the Republic of China (Taiwan)
- Chief of Air Force (Australia), the commander of the Royal Australian Air Force
- Cactus Air Force, an American aviation force in the Battle of Guadalcanal
- Croatian Armed Forces, the Croatian Air Force, Army and Navy
- Continental Air Force, a former major command of the United States Army Air Forces

== Computing and networking ==
- Canadian Access Federation, a service of CANARIE Inc
- SAP Composite Application Framework, a tool by SAP AG
- Core Audio Format, a file format from Apple for storing audio data
- Coarray Fortran, a parallel extension to Fortran language
- Cyber Assessment Framework for cybersecurity in the UK.

== Organisations ==
=== Governmental organisations ===
- Caisse d'allocations familiales, French governmental agencies for family-supporting subsidies
- Centro Andaluz de la Fotografía, a photography institution based in Almeria
- Congressional Award Foundation, a public-private organization which recognizes youth achievement in the United States

=== Political organisations ===
- Campaign for America's Future, an American political organization
- Pentapartito, an Italian political coalition

=== Sport organisations ===
- Club alpin français, French mountain club
- Confederation of African Football, the governing body for association football in Africa
- Challenged Athletes Foundation, a US nonprofit foundation

=== Transnational organisations ===
- Central African Federation, a federation of Rhodesia and Nyasaland between 1953 and 1963
- CAF – Development Bank of Latin America (Corporación Andina de Fomento), Latin American development bank

=== Other organisations ===
- Canadian Arab Federation, a group representing Arab Canadians
- Charities Aid Foundation, a UK charity
- Coalition for App Fairness, a non-profit organisation
- Commemorative Air Force, a Texas-based organisation that preserves and shows historical aircraft; formerly known as the Confederate Air Force
- Construcciones y Auxiliar de Ferrocarriles, a Spanish rail equipment manufacturer
- Cooley's Anemia Foundation, United States non-profit organisation

== Science ==
- Calcium(I) fluoride (CaF), a chemical compound
- Calcium fluoride (CaF_{2}), a chemical compound
- Cancer-associated fibroblast, a tumorous cell type
- Cellular angiofibroma, a benign tumor of superficial soft tissues
- CHAF1A (chromatin assembly factor-1), a protein complex maintaining chromatin
- Conductive anodic filament, an electrochemical migration-type failure in printed circuit boards

== Other uses ==
- Central African Republic, by ISO 3166-1 country code
- Common Assessment Framework, an EU tool to bring quality improvements to public sector services
- Community Adjustment Fund, part of the 2009 Canadian federal budget

== See also ==
- Cafe (disambiguation)
- CAFS (disambiguation)
- Qaf (disambiguation)
