= Cafeteria (disambiguation) =

Cafeteria may refer to:

- Cafeteria, a room for eating in
- Cafeteria (genus), a genus of bicosoecid, a group of unicellular flagellates
- Cafeteria roenbergensis, the type species of the genus.

== See also ==
- Cafe (disambiguation)
- Coffeehouse (disambiguation)
- Cafetière
