= Coffeehouse (disambiguation) =

A coffeehouse is an establishment which primarily serves prepared coffee or other hot beverages.

Coffeehouse or Coffee House may also refer to:

- The Coffee House (play), a 1738 play by James Miller
- Coffee House (TV series), South Korean television series
- Coffeehouse (event), a social event, often held to raise funds for or generate awareness of a cause, which generally serves coffee
- The Coffee House (Sirius XM), a Sirius XM Radio station
- The Coffee House (coffeehouse chain), a Vietnamese coffee house chain
- Kofe Khauz, (Кофе Хауз or Coffee House), a chain of coffeehouses in Russia
- Coffeehousing at bridge or whist, making improper remarks with the aim of gaining an unfair advantage
- Coffee House Press, an American publisher
- Das Kaffeehaus, an Austrian-style cafe in Castlemaine, Victoria, Australia

== See also ==
- Cafe (disambiguation)
- Coffee shop (disambiguation)
- Coffeehouses of the Arab World
