= Kofe =

Kofe may refer to

- KOFE, an American radio station
- Chorny Kofe, a Russian heavy metal band
- Kofe Khauz, a chain of coffee shops in Russia and Ukraine
- Simon Kofe, a Tuvaluan politician
- Tevita Kofe Ngalu (born 1973), Tongan weightlifter
