= CAF Bank =

CAF Bank is used by various financial institutions worldwide. The term, either as whole or as part of a combination of names, may refer to:

- CAF – Development Bank of Latin America and the Caribbean, (Corporación Andina de Fomento), Latin American development bank
- CAF Bank, an associated banking institution of Charities Aid Foundation § Services to charities

== See also ==
- CAF
