= Coffee shop =

Coffee shop may refer to:

== Shops and establishments ==
- Coffeehouse or café, an establishment where coffee is served
- Coffeeshop (Netherlands), a place where cannabis products are sold and consumed
- Coffee shop, in the U.S., a casual, popular-priced restaurant similar to a diner
- Kopitiam, a version of the coffee shops common in Singapore and Malaysia
- The Coffee Shop (New York City), a defunct American restaurant

== Television ==
- Coffee Shop (Urban TV), Ugandan TV series

== Music ==
- "Coffee Shop" (B.A.P song)
- "Coffee Shop" (Red Hot Chili Peppers song)
- "Coffee Shop" (Yung Joc song)
- "Coffee Shop Soundtrack", a single by All Time Low

== See also ==
- Cafe (disambiguation)
- Coffeehouse (disambiguation)
