= Qaf =

Qaf or QAF may refer to:

- Qāf (ق), a letter in the Arabic alphabet
  - Qāf (surah) the fiftieth surah of the Quran
- Qaf (Khowar letter), in the Chitrali alphabet
- Ka with descender (Қ қ), a Cyrillic letter in the Kazakh, Uzbek, and Abkhaz alphabets
- Mount Qaf, a location in Arabic and Persian mythology.
- QAF Brunei, an investment company owned by Prince Mohamed Bolkiah
- QAF FC, a football (soccer) club from Bandar Seri Begawan, Brunei
- QAF Limited, a company listed on the Singapore Exchange
- Qatar Amiri Flight, an airline
- Quality Air Force, a United States Air Force quality control program
- Queer Arts Festival an annual multi-disciplinary arts festival in Vancouver, British Columbia, Canada
- Queer as Folk (British TV series), a 1999–2000 television series
- Queer as Folk (American TV series), a 2000–2005 remake of the British series
- Queer as Folk (2022 TV series), a British-American reimagining of the earlier series
