= Cafe (disambiguation) =

A café or cafe is a small restaurant or coffeehouse.

More specifically, it can mean a small, affordable, eatery. This includes establishments also called:

- Cafe (British), or "transport cafe" (UK)
- Parisian café
- Diner, or "coffee shop" (USA)
- Cafe, a type of privately owned convenience store in South Africa

Cafe, café, or CAFE may also refer to:

== Acronym ==
CAFE may refer to:

- CAFE Foundation ("Comparative Aircraft Flight Efficiency"), a U.S. non-profit aviation development and flight test
- Canadian Association for Free Expression
- Canadian Association for Equality
- Clean Air for Europe
- Corporate Average Fuel Economy, a U.S. standard for minimum fuel efficiency in vehicles

== Art, entertainment, and media ==
=== Television shows and episodes ===
- The Cafe (2004 talk show), a 2004–2010 Irish talk show that aired on RTÉ Two
- The Café (2011 talk show), a 2011 Al Jazeera English talk show
- The Café (New Zealand TV program), a 2016 New Zealand morning television program that airs on Three
- The Café (British TV series), a 2011–2013 British television comedy series about a fictional cafe in the seaside town of Weston-super-Mare, United Kingdom that aired on Sky1
- "The Cafe" (Seinfeld), an episode of the American TV show
- "Café" (Bluey), an episode of the Australian TV show

=== Other art, entertainment, and media ===
- Café (2010 film), an American film
- Café (2014 film), a Mexican documentary
- Project Cafe, the unconfirmed codename of Nintendo's eighth generation console, Wii U
- Café: A Collection of Literary Sketches, a book by Japanese author Novala Takemoto
- Café (magazine), a men's fashion magazine in Sweden

== Television channels ==
- Polsat Cafe, a Polish television channel
- Zee Café, an Indian television channel

== Other uses ==
- Cafe (plant genus), a former genus in the family Rubiaceae; a synonym for Coffea
- @Cafe, a former New York City based Internet café
- CAFE (media company), a media company
- Café (musician), a Brazilian percussionist, singer, and composer, real name Edson Aparecido da Silva
- Café, a brand of home appliances from GE Appliances

== See also ==
- CAF (disambiguation)
- Café culture of Baghdad
- Cafeteria, a type of restaurant, usually self-serve
- Caffè, a term for Italian coffee
- Coffee the word café exists in many romance languages
- Coffee shop (disambiguation)
- Coffeehouse (disambiguation)
- Crisis cafe
