= Buda Historic Home & Garden =

Heritage-listed 19th century house and garden in Castlemaine, Australia

Coordinates: 37°03′30″S 144°13′25″E

Buda Historic Home and Garden
- Delhi Villa
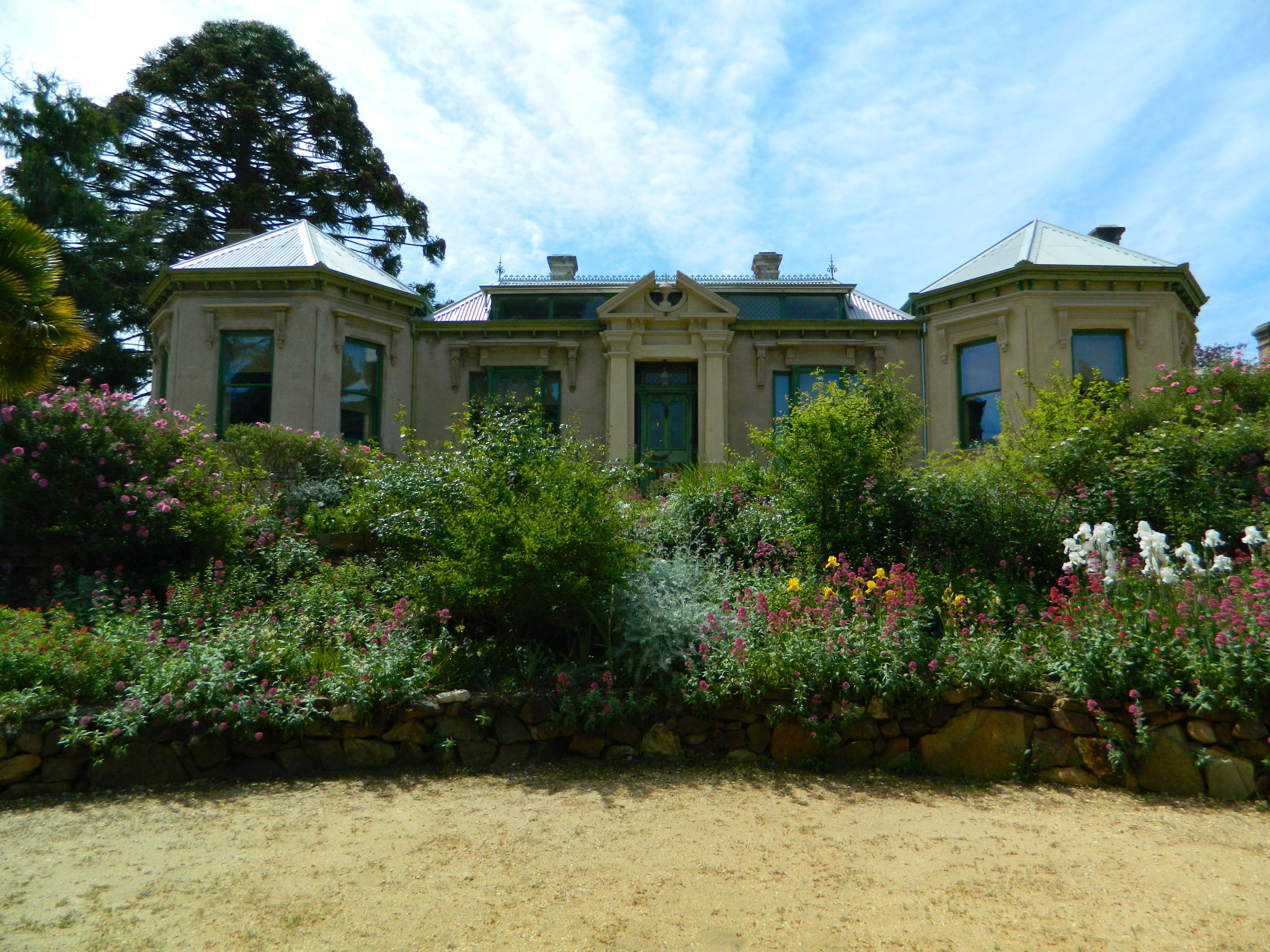
- Buda

- Location in Victoria
- Type: Villa, associated built facilities and gardens
- Location: 42–48 Hunter Street Castlemaine, Victoria
- Nearest city: Bendigo

History
- Built: 1857–1861
- Built for: Reverend James Smith and family

Site notes
- Area: 1.2 ha (3.0 acres)
- Architectural style: Italianate
- Restored: 1890
- Restored by: Ernest Leviny
- Governing body: Buda Historic Home and Garden Incorporated
- Owner: Trustees of the Castlemaine Art Gallery and Historic Museum (CAGHM)
- Visitors: 5942 (in 2019–20 excluding COVID restricted period)
- Website: https://budacastlemaine.org

Victorian Heritage Register
- Official name: Buda Historic Home and Garden
- Type: Registered Place
- Designated: 21 March 1978
- Reference no.: VHR H0134

Buda is a heritage-listed historic house and garden located in Castlemaine, Victoria, Australia. It was added to the Victorian Heritage Database on 15 October 1970, when it was purchased by the Trustees of the Castlemaine Art Gallery and Historic Museum (CAGHM) which oversees its management.

Since 1981 the house (museum) and garden are open to the public Monday to Sunday 12pm to 4pm, except Good Friday and Christmas Day.

== House ==
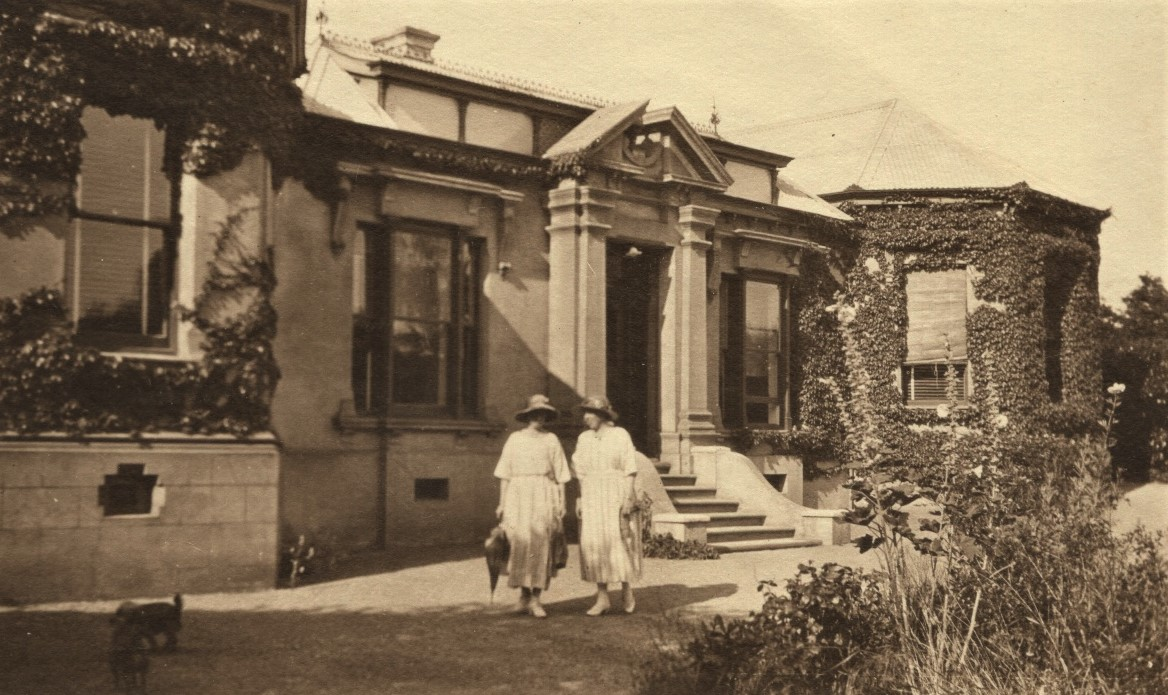
Women in summer dress in front of Italianate villa, Buda, in Castlemaine, 1920s

=== Delhi Villa ===
Built by a retired Baptist Missionary, Reverend James Smith, in 1861 and originally named Delhi Villa, the original plan was a six-roomed brick house with an encircling verandah, based on the Indian Bungalow he considered the most suitable style of housing for the Australian climate. However, within two years, Smith decided to return with his family to his missionary work in India and the house was put up for auction.

=== Ernest Leviny purchase ===
The property was purchased in 1863 by businessman and jeweller Ernest Leviny to serve as the marital home for Leviny and his second wife, Bertha Hudson, whom he married the following year. They raised their family of ten children in the house. Leviny oversaw many changes and alterations to the house and grounds, particularly between the years 1890–1900. It was around this time that the house was renamed Buda after the capital of Hungary, Budapest.

== Garden ==
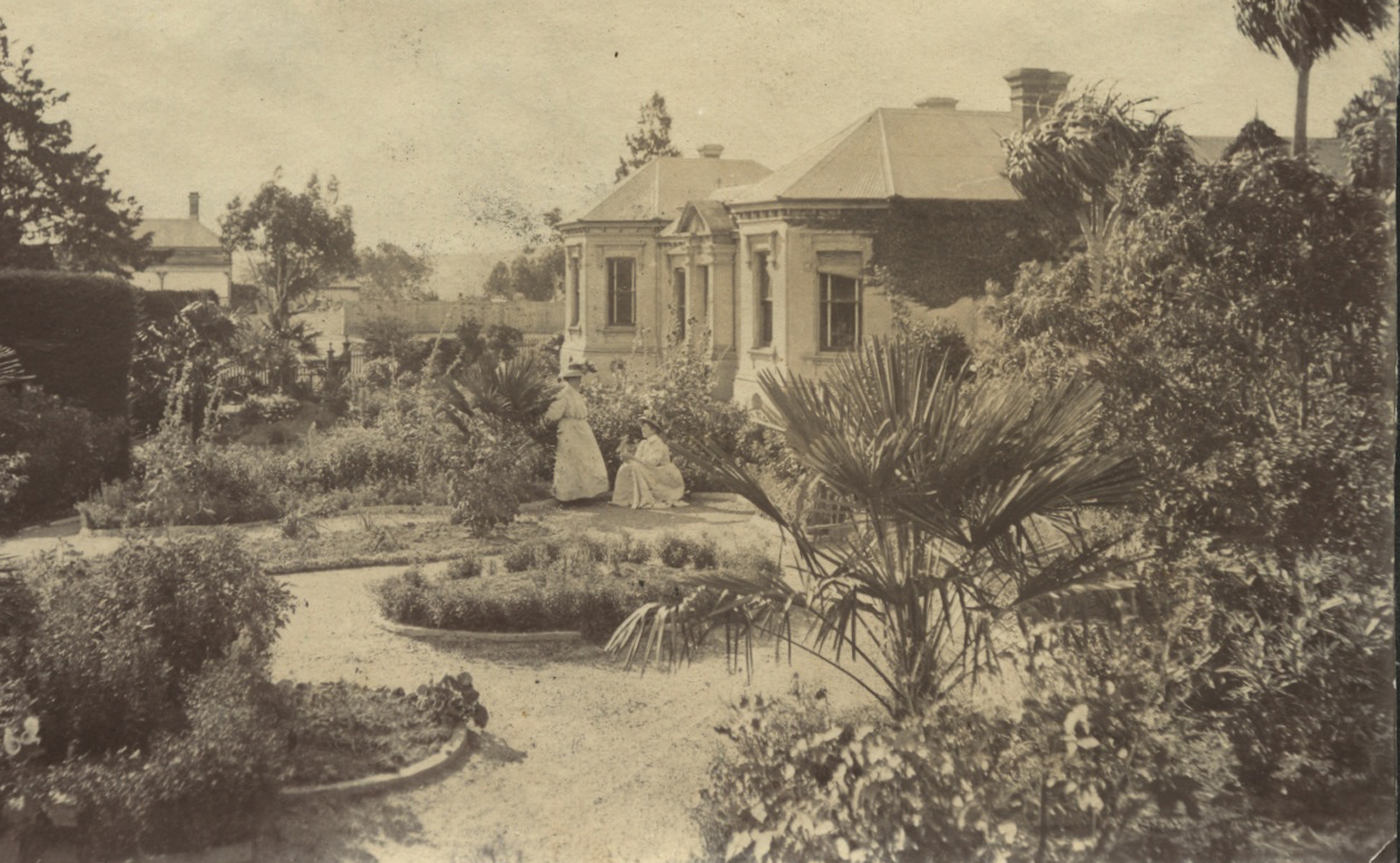
Leviny sisters in the garden of Buda villa in Castlemaine, view to the west, c.1910

The home is elevated above the town with extensive views to the south and south-west, and occupies a site of 1.2 hectares in original established gardens. Botanist Baron Ferdinand von Mueller was a guest of the house while designing Castlemaine Botanical Gardens, and is considered to have influenced the garden design, and to have presented to the family some of its now largest trees. Among the most significant large nineteenth century, early twentieth century gardens surviving in Victoria, it is significant for the compartmentalised nature of the layout, relative intactness, and for the survival of two notable garden buildings, the aviary and the former tennis pavilion.

In 1984, after 3 years of being open to the public, the grounds and plantings were restored with funding from the Victorian government Gardens and Environment Committee to mark the state's 150th anniversary. The work was further financed, undertaken and continued by a Friends of Buda association founded by local historian Peter Cuffley who after making a survey, recruited the services of Castlmaine horticulturalists Clive and Margaret Winmill. The house and garden were beneficiaries of further state funding announced in May 1985, and gardeners were employed in the mid-1980s under the Commonwealth Employment Program.

In 2011 a large cypress hedge, a major feature of the garden facing the facade, proved moribund and was removed using a grant from the Australian Garden History Society, thus restoring the original vista enjoyed from the house. It was replaced with twelve new trees.

== Leviny family ==
The house is full of Ernest's and the daughters' artworks and artefacts including jewellery and enamelwork, embellished fabrics, woodwork and photography; one of the daughters even decorated the cornice in one of the bedrooms.

=== Ernest Leviny ===
Ernest Leviny was born at Szepesszombat ( Spišská Sobota, Georgenberg) Hungary, in 1818 and trained as a silversmith and jeweller in Budapest. Arriving at Port Phillip, Melbourne, early in 1853, he went directly to the rich alluvial goldfields of Forest Creek, and the bustling new township of Castlemaine. There, he established a successful watchmaking and jewellery business in the Market Square. By 1863, he was able to retire from business and purchase Delhi Villa. In 1864, he married Bertha Hudson, bringing her to Castlemaine to settle at Delhi Villa. Leviny was a clock maker, goldsmith and silversmith.

=== Children ===
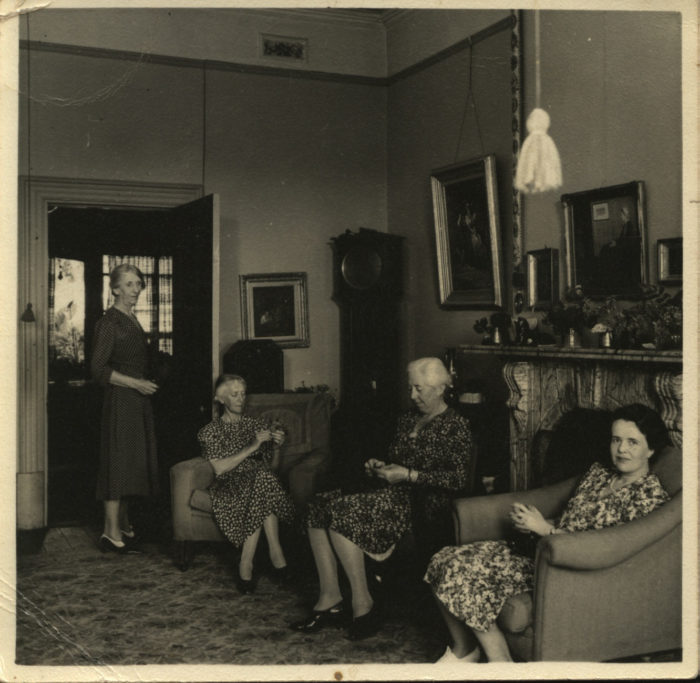
The Leviny family making craftwork in the sitting room of Buda villa in Castlemaine

Ernest and Bertha had ten children between 1865 and 1883: four sons: Louis, Alfred, Ernest and Francis, and six daughters: Mary, Ilma, Beatrice (Kate), Gertrude, Bertha (Dorothy) and Hilda. Of their four sons, two died under the age of five years. The Leviny daughters were encouraged to pursue their artistic interests at a time when women were being given more opportunities to study art and take up careers. They worked across a range of media including painting, woodcarving, metalwork, photography, and needlework in which they had their mother's example in the production of clothing by hand.

Each of the daughters was creative in some form of art or craft.

- Mary, the eldest, had much to do in helping to run the household, and was a major contributor to making everyone's clothes, embroidering, smocking and decorating.
- Hilda specialised in embroidery. Three of her works were shown in the First Australian Exhibition of Women's Work 1907, including a three-panelled draught screen with hand embroidered and appliquéd panels which is on display at Buda.
- Gertrude specialised in woodcarving
- Kate specialised in photography
- Dorothy won awards for her fine art and photography and specialised in metal and enamel work

== Family legacy ==
From 1905, after Ernest's death, a British Arts and Crafts style was embraced by his daughters and practiced in their furnishing and decoration of the house interior; its fittings and colour schemes, handcrafted items, metalwork light fittings and embroidered soft furnishings, mostly made by the Leviny women.

Due to the foresight of last surviving sister, Hilda, Buda was preserved as a house and garden museum when she sold the property to the Trustees of the Castlemaine Art Gallery and Historic Museum in 1970. Her mother Bertha had provided temporary accommodation in a shop she owned when the gallery was being established in 1913, and sisters Mary and Kate were amongst its founders, and contributed to the development of the gallery's collection of prints in the late 1920s. Kate was a keen art collector and amongst her purchases still retained at Buda are works by Margaret Preston, Mildred Lovett, Norbertine Bresslern Roth and other women printmakers of the era.

=== Buda today ===
The Leviny family inhabited the house continuously for 118 years from 1863 to 1981. When the last surviving daughter, Hilda, died at the age of 98 years, the house and garden were opened to the public from Boxing Day that year. It remains a popular tourist destination and is a major venue during the bi-annual Castlemaine State Festivals.

Since opening to the public, Buda has been managed by a team of volunteers from the local community in varied roles ranging from garden and maintenance, to archivists, to reception and tour guides.

The house reflects Leviny's vision of a ‘gentleman's villa’, a house befitting a successful Victorian businessman with its Italianate façade and surrounding garden. Buda retains its “parsley” green trims and shutters, characteristic of the country homes of Ernest Leviny's European origins.

To augment gate takings, fees for functions and events, shop and nursery sales, funding from local and other levels of government for the maintenance of the property since its opening has fluctuated, or has been insufficient. In 2018, Buda Historic House and Garden appealed to Mount Alexander Shire for $60,000 for conservation management plans and funding for a concept plan for the development of a new building to house a museum and archives office, and requested an increase from $7000 to $20,000 in recurrent annual funding, “to ensure BUDA can maintain its current level of community engagement”, but was refused. Recently, Buda received two Victorian state government Living Heritage Grants; in 2018–2019 for irrigation, trees, and paths; and 2019–2020 for repairs to the building

== Displays and exhibitions ==
Curators of Buda collections were Jean Wyldebore in the 1970s and 80s and Lauretta Zilles, (inaugural curator at Castlemaine's Gallery) until 2022, then Meredith Blake (house curator) succeeded by Sarah Frazer in April 2024, and Carol Henderson (garden) since.

- 1984: Tableau of 18th Century Dress, 14–15 April, part of Heritage Week '84 organised by the National Trust of Australia (Victoria)
- 1987: Sketches and paintings by Ernest Leviny and his daughters
- 2005: Contemporary Australian Silver & Metalwork Award
- 2018, to 11 July: Buda biennial Textiles Exhibition

== See also ==
- Das Kaffeehaus
