= Dorothy Leviny =

Australian artist (1881–1968)

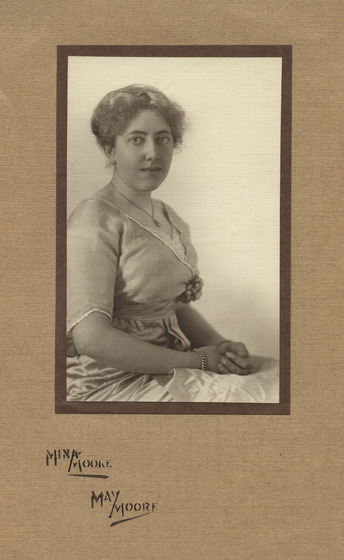
- Dorothy photographed by May and Mina Moore, c.1913 Image from the collection of Buda Historic Home & Garden
- Born: Bertha Dorothy Leviny; 1881; Castlemaine, Victoria, Australia
- Died: 9 April 1968 (aged 86–87); Castlemaine, Victoria, Australia
- Known for: Drawing, painting, metalworking
- Notable work: Copper Tea and Coffee Service, held by National Gallery of Victoria

Bertha "Dorothy" Leviny (1881– 9 April 1968) was an Australian artist.

== Biography ==
Leviny was born in 1881 in Castlemaine, Victoria to Ernest Leviny, a Hungarian silversmith and jeweller, and Bertha Leviny, (née Hudson) a homemaker. Her father arrived in Melbourne from London in 1853, intending to mine on the goldfields before discovering the machinery he had brought with him to be unsuitable. Instead of returning home he settled in Castlemaine, establishing a jewellery and watchmaking business in Market Square in 1854.

Ernest bought the house at Delhi Villa, later called Buda, in 1863 before any of the children were born.

The second youngest of ten children, Dorothy Leviny had five sisters and four brothers. She studied art at the Castlemaine School of Mines in 1900, achieving first class grades in drawing, then from 1901–1908 attended Bendigo School of Mines under Arthur T. Woodward, as did her sisters Mary and Gertrude before her, with Mary also attending painting classes in Melbourne under Jane Sutherland. As a young woman, Leviny was elected Secretary of the newly formed Women's National League branch at Castlemaine.

Dorothy and her younger sister Hilda both exhibited in the First Australian Exhibition of Women's Work 1907, with Dorothy entering a still life painting and wallpaper designs, and Hilda an embroidered screen and a tablecloth. She also created one of the few surviving posters for the event. Her wallpaper design won second prize in the Fine and Applied Arts and Photography section. They exhibited alongside fellow artists Violet Teague, May Vale, A.M.E. Bale, and Eirene Mort. They both later showed back in Castlemaine at an exhibition held by the Progress Association, with Hilda entering Irish crochet and Dorothy a cloth stencil design for a cushion, a local orchid stencil cloth, five designs for tiles, and one for wallpaper.

After spending time in Melbourne attending the Domestic Science College, she worked as a house mistress and a matron at schools before returning to Buda in 1923, the year her mother Bertha died. The wealth accumulated by Ernest allowed the Leviny women to live comfortable lives and afforded them the social standing and freedom to pursue their interests.

All the sisters had an area of the garden that they tended, but Dorothy was the one responsible for it. Before she returned to Buda she had a lavender farm at Silvan near the Dandenongs, which was ultimately unsuccessful. This passion for gardening however led to her keeping bees at Buda and entering submissions into local flower shows.

Along with her sisters Mary and Kate, and other women in the Castlemaine Progress Association, they were significant in the establishment of the Castlemaine Art Gallery and Museum, being involved for all of their lives and Dorothy even serving as Museum Director for five years. Before the gallery had its own premises, their mother Bertha allowed their shopfront at Lyttleton Street for the committee's first display.

Leviny studied metal work and enameling under Stanley Ellis at the Castlemaine Technical School starting in 1925. This interest in metal work spanned many years, with her pursuing silversmithing and pewter work at RMIT (what was then the Workingmen's College) well into her sixties. She used her father's studio at Buda to display her work.

She died on 9 April 1968 at Castlemaine, Victoria.

Designed by Dorothy at Buda

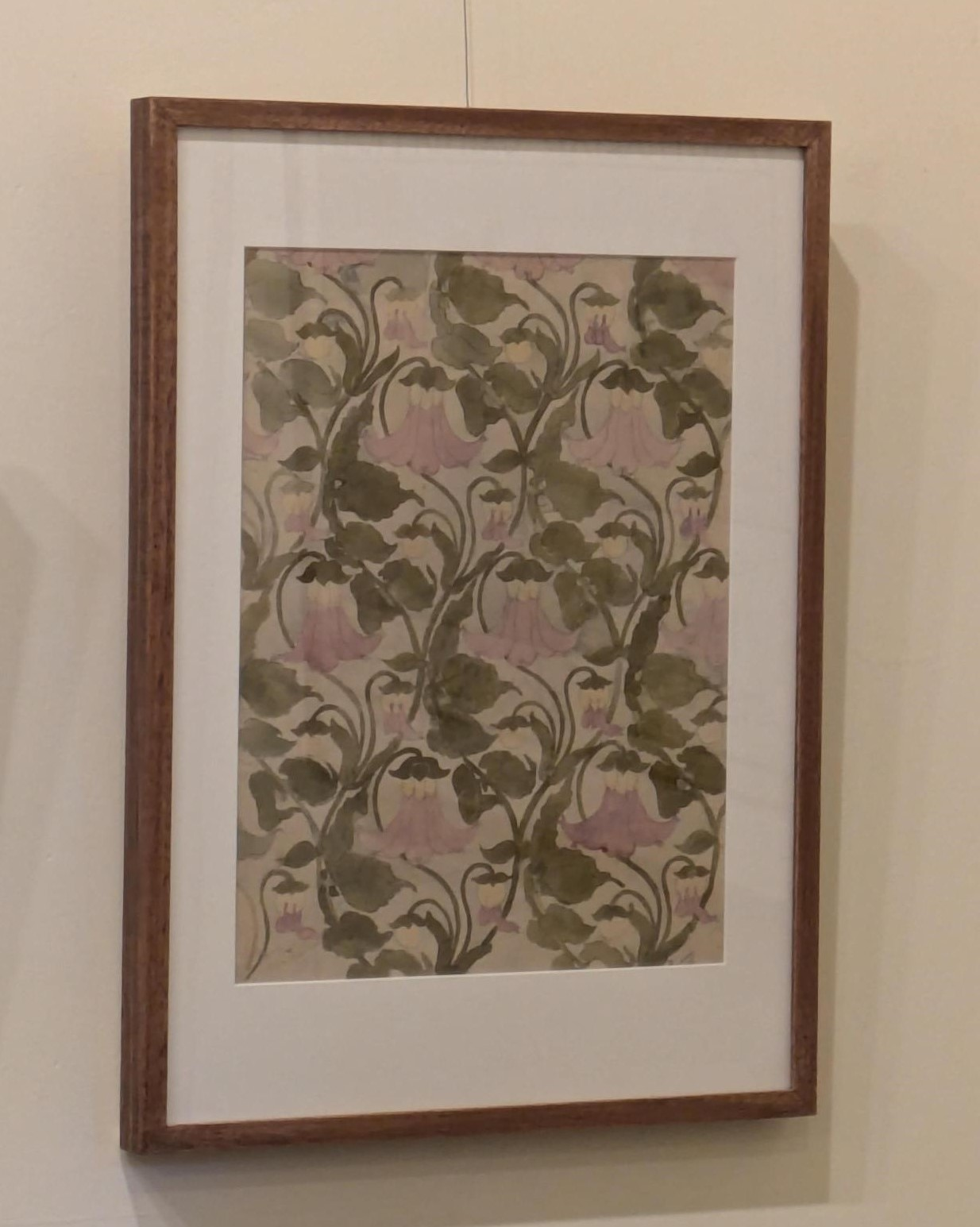
Wallpaper design

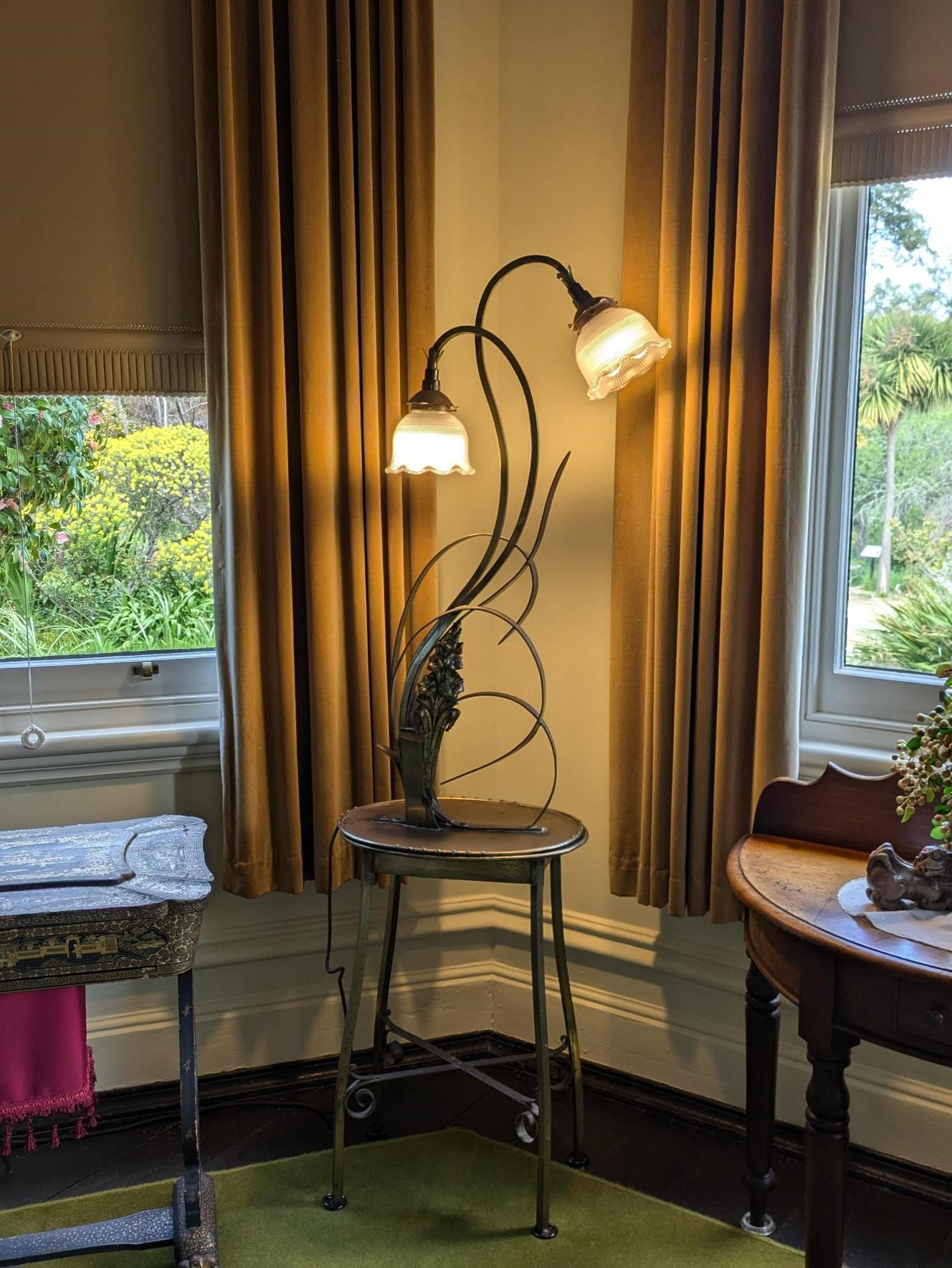
Lamp

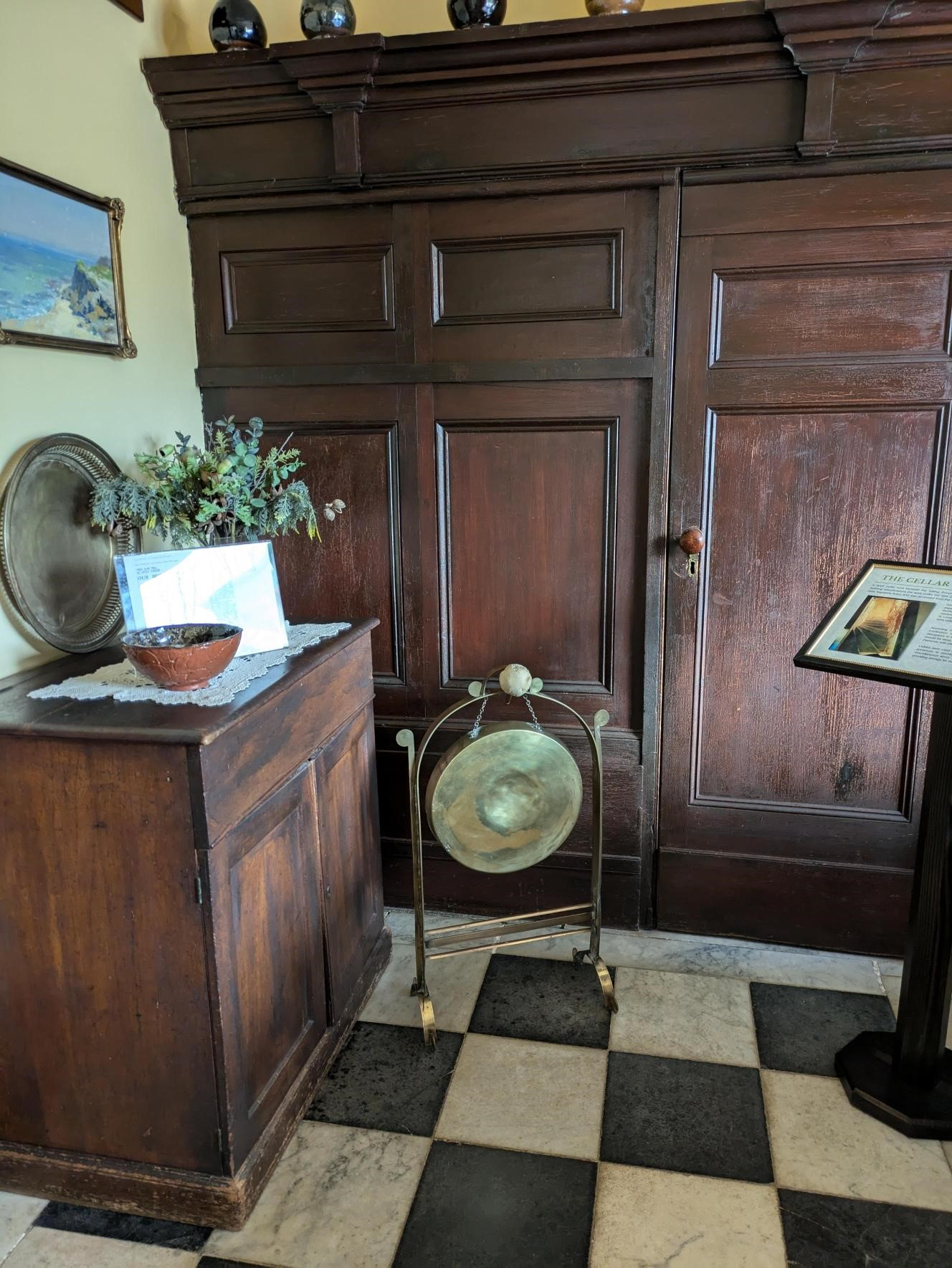
Dinner gong

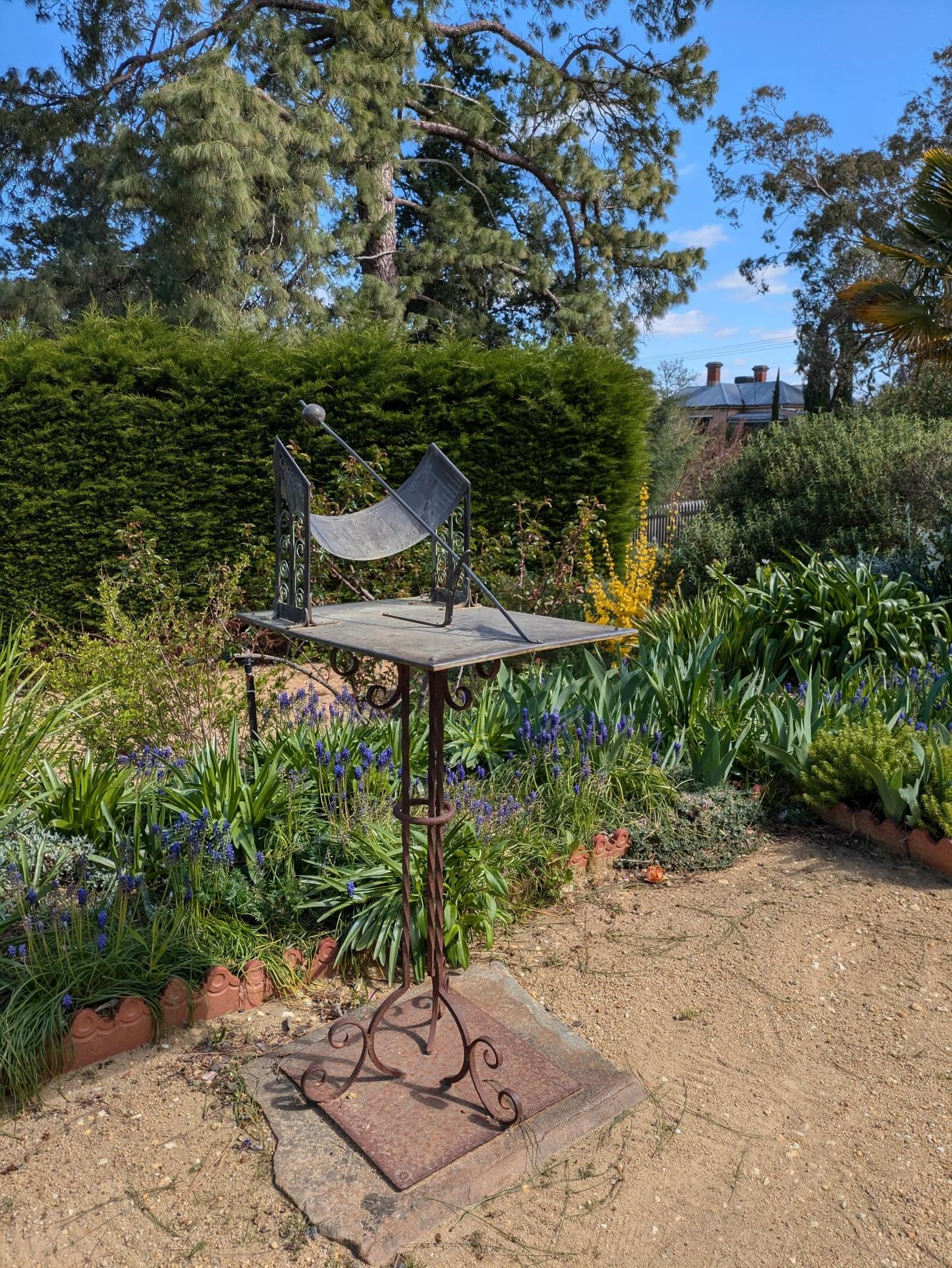
Sun dial

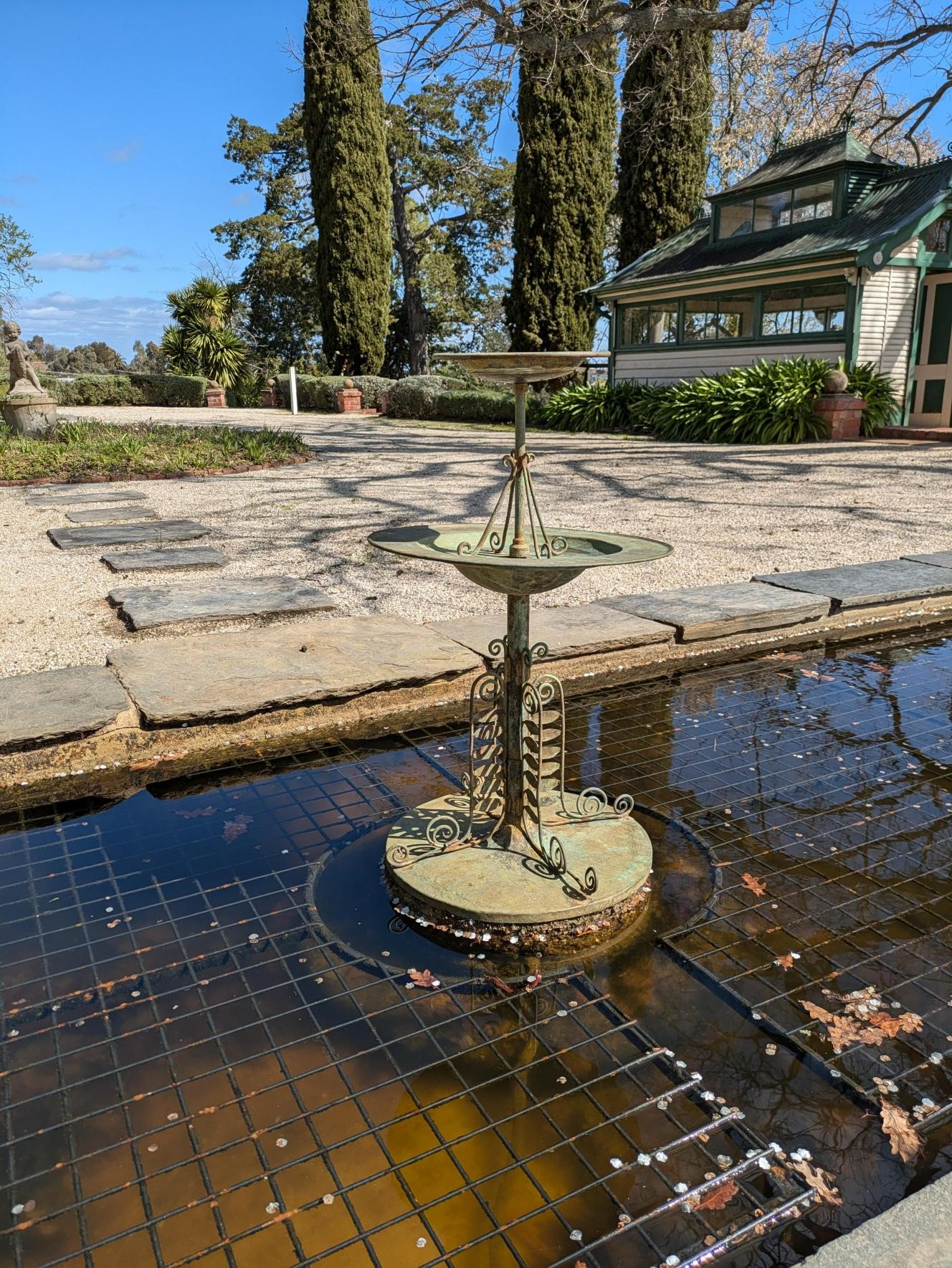
Water fountain

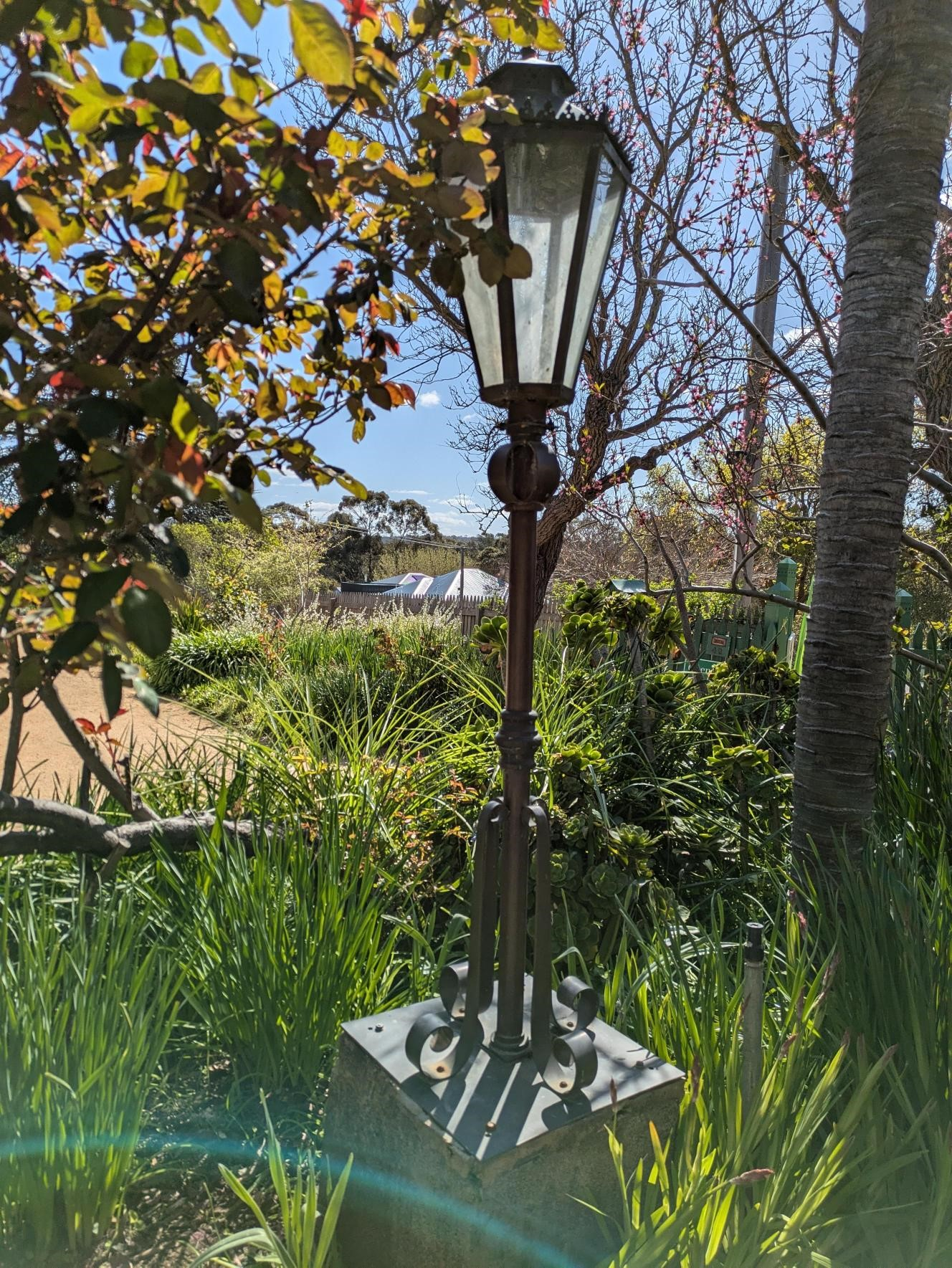
Lamp post

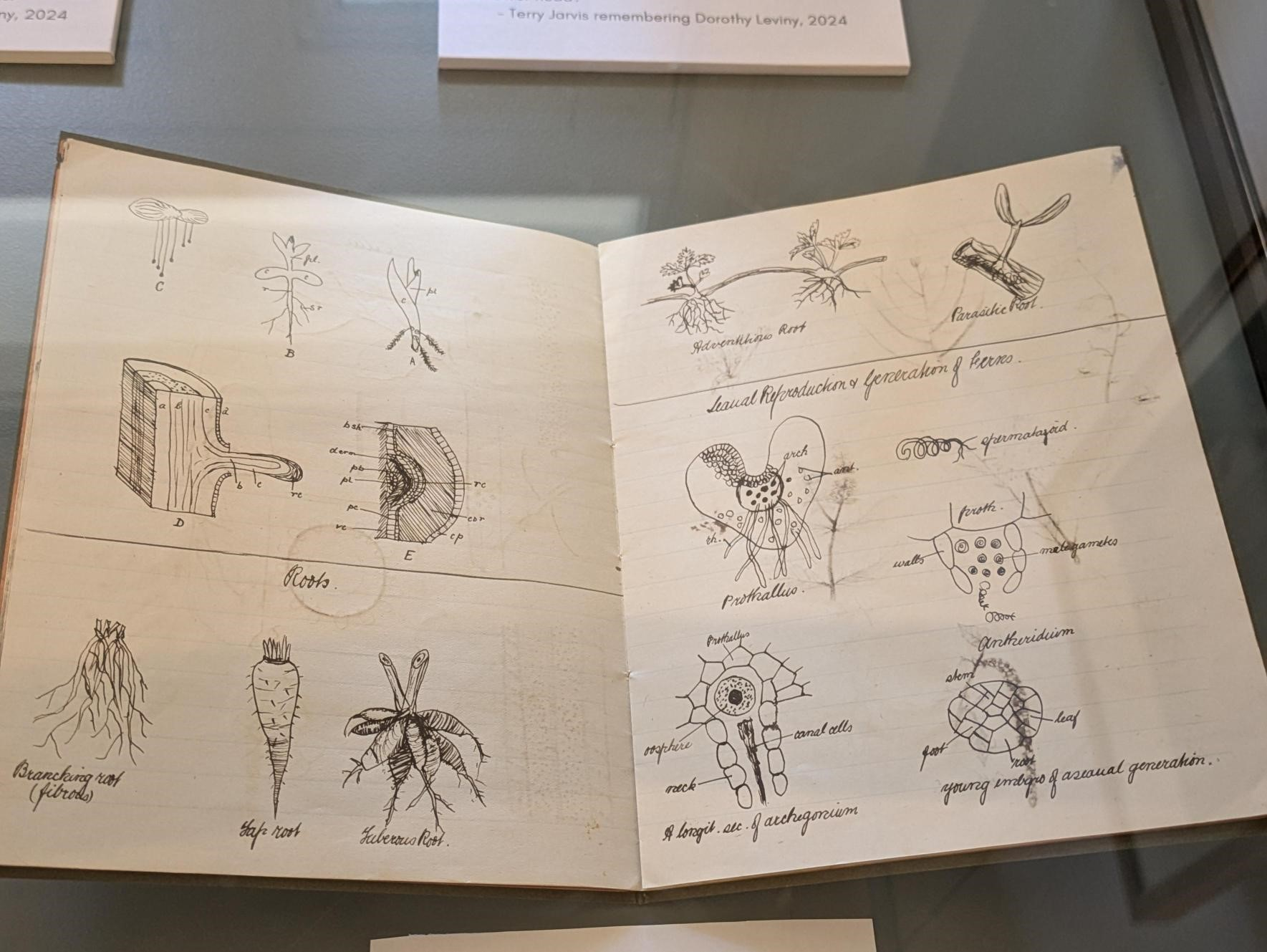
Notebook

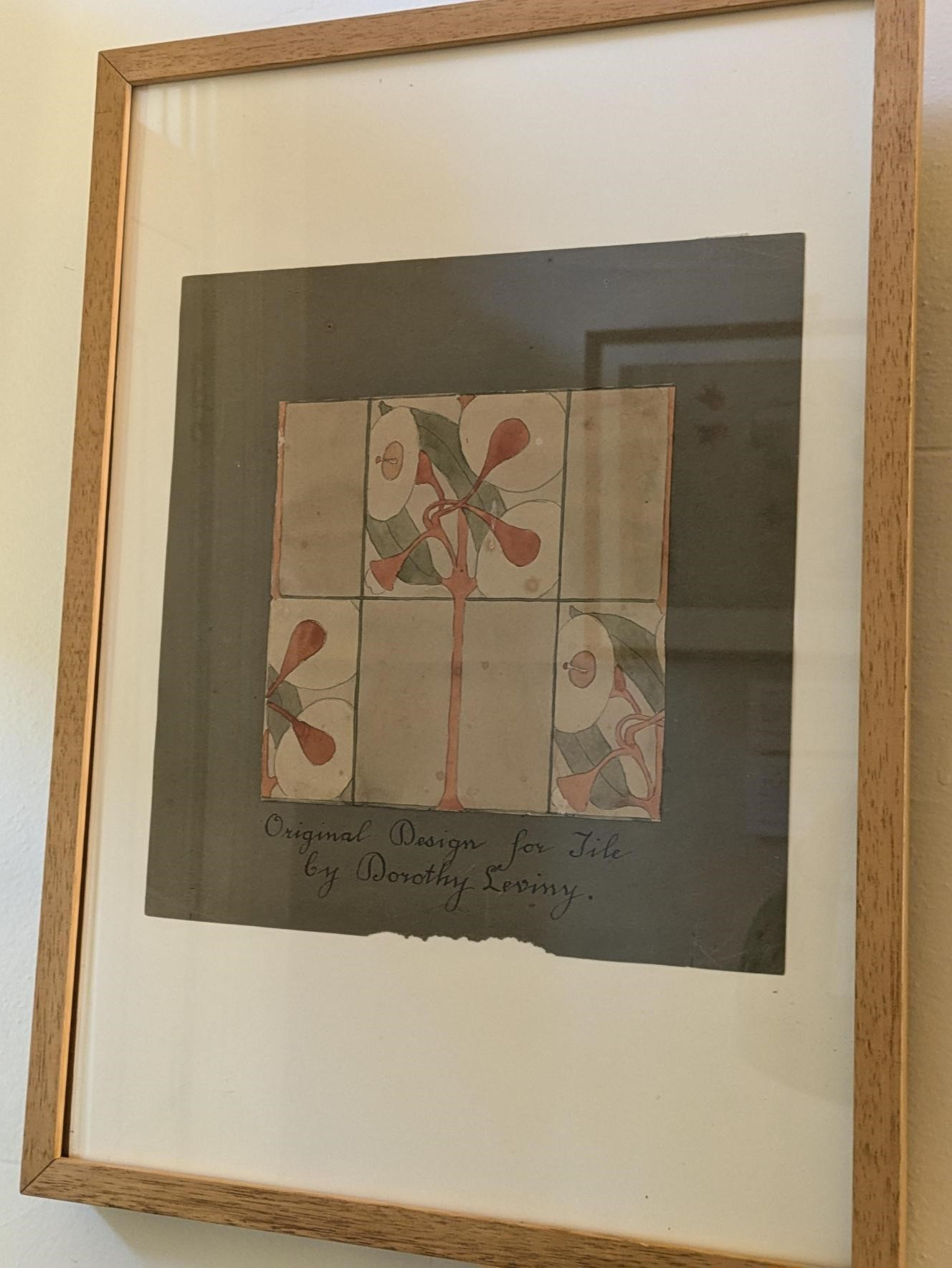
Tile design

== Legacy ==
The craftiness and skill at art and design of all the Leviny sisters were effused into the Castlemaine home at Buda. When Ernest died in 1905, the redecoration of the house began, heavily influenced by the arts and crafts movement at the time. Leviny's metal working included enameled decoration, with her sisters working on stained glass, wax flowers, and embroidery. The house at Buda which still stands today is a testament to the hard work and creativity of the Leviny women. The furnishings and objects within the house remain as part of the Buda Historic Home & Garden, the property of which was deed-gifted to the Trustees of the Castlemaine Art Gallery and Historical Museum by the last surviving sister, Hilda, in 1970. It was officially opened to the public as a museum in 1982.
