= Conductive anodic filament =

Metallic filament

Conductive anodic filament, also called CAF, is a metallic filament that forms from an electrochemical migration process and is known to cause printed circuit board (PCB) failures.

== Mechanism ==
CAF formation is a process involving the transport of conductive chemistries across a nonmetallic substrate under the influence of an applied electric field. CAF is influenced by electric field strength, temperature (including soldering temperatures), humidity, laminate material, and the presence of manufacturing defects. The occurrence of CAF failures has been primarily driven by the electronics industry pushing for higher density circuit boards and the use of electronics in harsher environments for high reliability applications.

== Failure modes and detection ==
CAF commonly occurs between adjacent vias (i.e. plated through holes) inside a PCB, as the copper migrates along the glass/resin interface from anode to cathode. CAF failures can manifest as current leakage, intermittent electrical shorts, and even dielectric breakdown between conductors in printed circuit boards. This often makes CAF very difficult to detect, especially when it occurs as an intermittent issue. There are a few things that can be done to isolate the fault location and confirm CAF as a root cause of a failure. If the issue is intermittent then putting the sample of interest under combined temperature-humidity-bias (THB) may help recreate the failure mode. In addition, techniques such as cross sectioning or superconducting quantum interference device (SQUID) can be used to identify the failure.

== Considerations and mitigation ==
There are several design considerations and mitigation techniques that can be used to reduce the susceptibility to CAF. Certain material selection (i.e. laminate) and design rules (i.e. via spacing) can help reduce CAF risk. Poor adhesion between the resin and glass fibers in the PCB can create a path for CAF to occur. This may depend on parameters of the silane finish applied to the glass fibers, which is used to promote adhesion to the resin. There are also testing standards that can be performed to assess CAF risk. IPC TM-650 2.6.25 provides a test method to assess CAF susceptibility. Additionally, IPC TM-650 2.6.16 provides a pressure vessel test method to rapidly evaluate glass epoxy laminate integrity. This is helpful but it may often be better to use design rules and proper material selection to proactively mitigate the issue.

== See also ==
- Whisker (metallurgy)
