= CAFS =

CAFS may refer to:

- Compressed air foam system, a system used in firefighting to deliver fire retardant foam to a fire
- Content Addressable File Store, a hardware device developed by International Computers Limited that provided a disk storage with built-in search capability

== See also ==
- CAF (disambiguation)
