= Merrill McPeak =

United States Air Force general (born 1936)

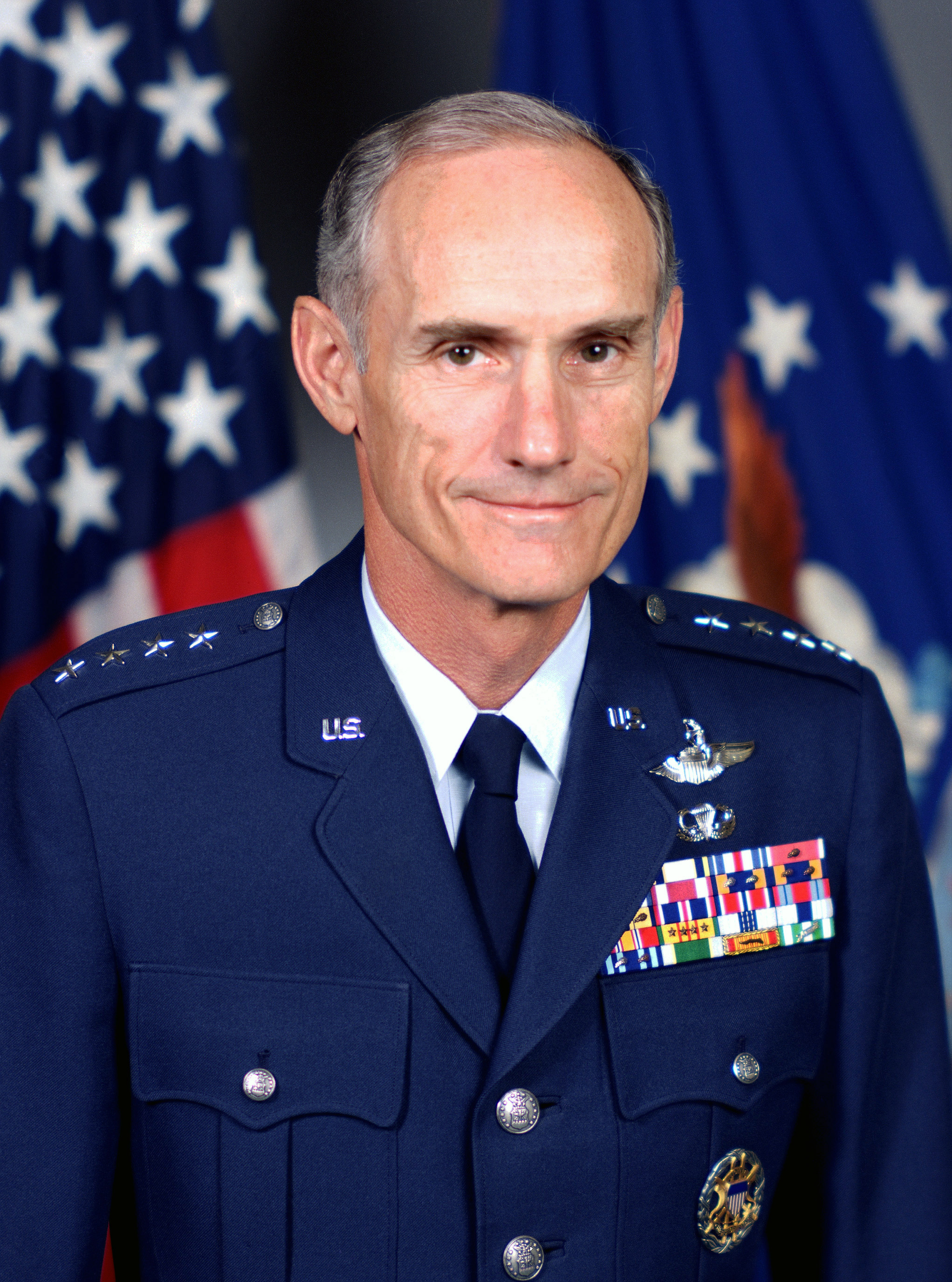
- McPeak in 1990

United States Secretary of the Air Force
- Acting
- In office July 14, 1993 – August 5, 1993
- President: Bill Clinton
- Preceded by: Michael B. Donley (acting)
- Succeeded by: Sheila Widnall

Chief of Staff of the United States Air Force
- In office October 30, 1990 – October 25, 1994
- President: George H. W. Bush; Bill Clinton
- Preceded by: John M. Loh (acting)
- Succeeded by: Ronald R. Fogleman

10th Chairman of the American Battle Monuments Commission
- In office July 2010 – 2018
- Preceded by: Frederick M. Franks Jr.
- Succeeded by: David Urban

Personal details
- Born: Merrill Anthony McPeak; January 9, 1936 (age 90) Santa Rosa, California, U.S.
- Party: Republican (before 2003); Independent (2003–2008); Democratic (2008–present)
- Education: San Diego State University (BA); George Washington University (MA)

Military service
- Allegiance: United States
- Branch/service: United States Air Force
- Years of service: 1957–1994
- Rank: General
- Commands: Chief of Staff of the United States Air Force; 12th Air Force; Pacific Air Forces; 20th Tactical Fighter Wing
- Battles/wars: Vietnam War
- Awards: Defense Distinguished Service Medal; Air Force Distinguished Service Medal (2); Silver Star; Legion of Merit (2); Distinguished Flying Cross (2)

Merrill Anthony McPeak (born January 9, 1936) is a retired 4-star general in the United States Air Force whose final assignment before retirement was as the 14th chief of staff of the Air Force from 1990 to 1994.

In 1993, McPeak served as Acting Secretary of the Air Force, before Sheila E. Widnall was appointed by President Bill Clinton, and is the only Chief of Staff of the Air Force and uniformed Air Force officer on active duty to have ever served as Acting Secretary.

== Early life and education ==
McPeak was born in Santa Rosa, California. After graduating from Grants Pass High School in Grants Pass, Oregon, he earned a Bachelor of Arts degree in economics from San Diego State College in 1957 and became a member of the Sigma Chi fraternity. He was commissioned through Air Force ROTC, and entered active duty in November of that year. He later earned a Master of Arts degree in international relations from George Washington University in 1974.

== Career ==
After completing preflight and pilot training, McPeak flew single-seat fighter aircraft, the F-100 Super Sabre and the F-104 Starfighter, in operational squadrons in the United States and the United Kingdom. He later returned to the United States as an instructor pilot and weapons officer at Luke Air Force Base, Arizona.

From December 1966 to December 1968, McPeak was assigned as an opposing solo and then lead solo pilot with the Thunderbirds, the Air Force's aerobatic flying team. While with the Thunderbirds, he performed in nearly 200 air shows in the United States and overseas.

Upon completion of his tour with the Thunderbirds, he was assigned as an F-100 pilot with the 37th Tactical Fighter Wing at Phù Cát Air Base in South Vietnam. On February 1, 1969, he was assigned to Project Commando Sabre (Detachment 1, 416th Tactical Fighter Squadron), known as the Misty FACs, a specialized group of high speed forward air controllers trying to stop vehicular resupply traffic down the Ho Chi Minh trail. He became the tenth commander of Commando Sabre on April 22, 1969, and moved it to the 31st Tactical Fighter Wing at Tuy Hoa Air Base on May 1, when the 37th TFW transitioned to the twin-seat F-4 Phantom II. Rotating out of his command on May 31, 1969 after 98 missions, he served as chief of standardization and evaluation for 31st TFW. McPeak completed a total of 269 combat missions while in Vietnam, was awarded the Silver Star, and remained in-country until 1970, after which he attended the Armed Forces Staff College in Norfolk, Virginia.

From 1970 to 1973, McPeak was an air operations staff officer for the Mideast Division at Headquarters USAF in Washington, D.C. After graduating from the National War College in 1974, he was named assistant deputy commander for operations for the 1st Tactical Fighter Wing at MacDill AFB, Florida flying the F-4 Phantom II. From 1975 to 1976, he was a military fellow with the Council on Foreign Relations in New York City.

In 1976, McPeak contributed an article to Foreign Affairs Journal expressing his views on the Israeli occupation of territories during the 1967 Arab-Israeli War.

In July 1976, he became commander of the 513th Combat Support Group based at RAF Mildenhall in the United Kingdom; a year later he moved to Zaragoza Air Base, Spain as vice commander of the 406th Tactical Fighter Training Wing. From 1978 to 1980, he was assistant chief of staff for current operations, Allied Air Forces Central Europe (in Boerfink, West Germany). 1980 and 1981 saw him flying the twin-seat F-111E fighter bomber and commanding the 20th Tactical Fighter Wing based at RAF Upper Heyford, United Kingdom. McPeak was chief of staff at USAFE headquarters from 1981 to 1982, and deputy chief of staff for plans at Tactical Air Command (TAC) headquarters, Langley AFB, Virginia from 1982 to 1985. He returned to Headquarters USAF in 1985–87 as deputy chief of staff for programs and resources.

In June 1987, McPeak moved to Bergstrom AFB, Texas in the dual roles of Commander, 12th Air Force and Commander of Air Forces for United States Southern Command. A year later, he was named commander-in-chief of Pacific Air Forces (PACAF).

=== Air Force Chief of Staff ===
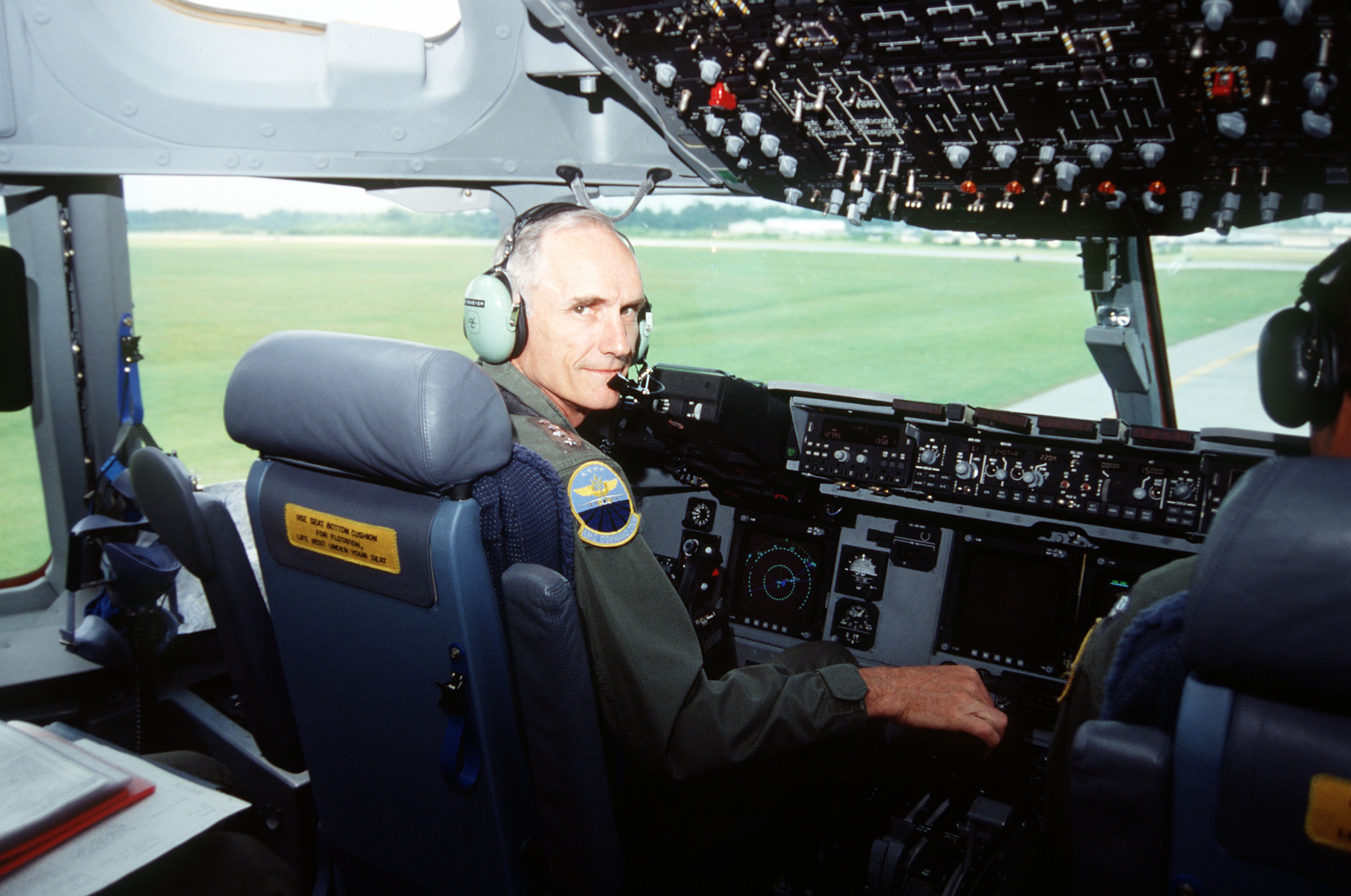
General Merrill McPeak piloted a Boeing C-17 Globemaster III during his tenure as Air Force Chief of Staff.

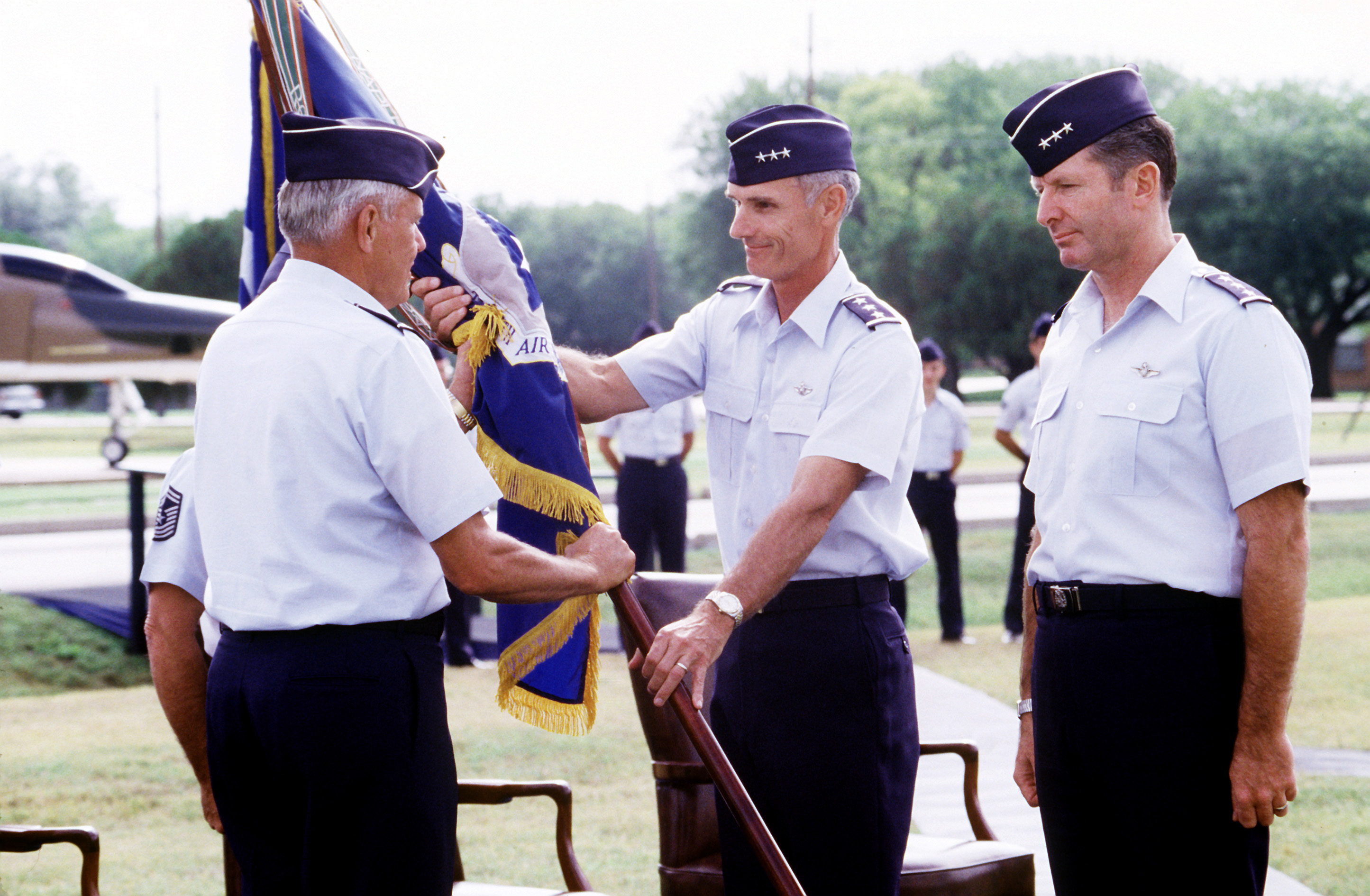
Lieutenant General Merrill McPeak during his tenure as commander of The 12th Air Force.

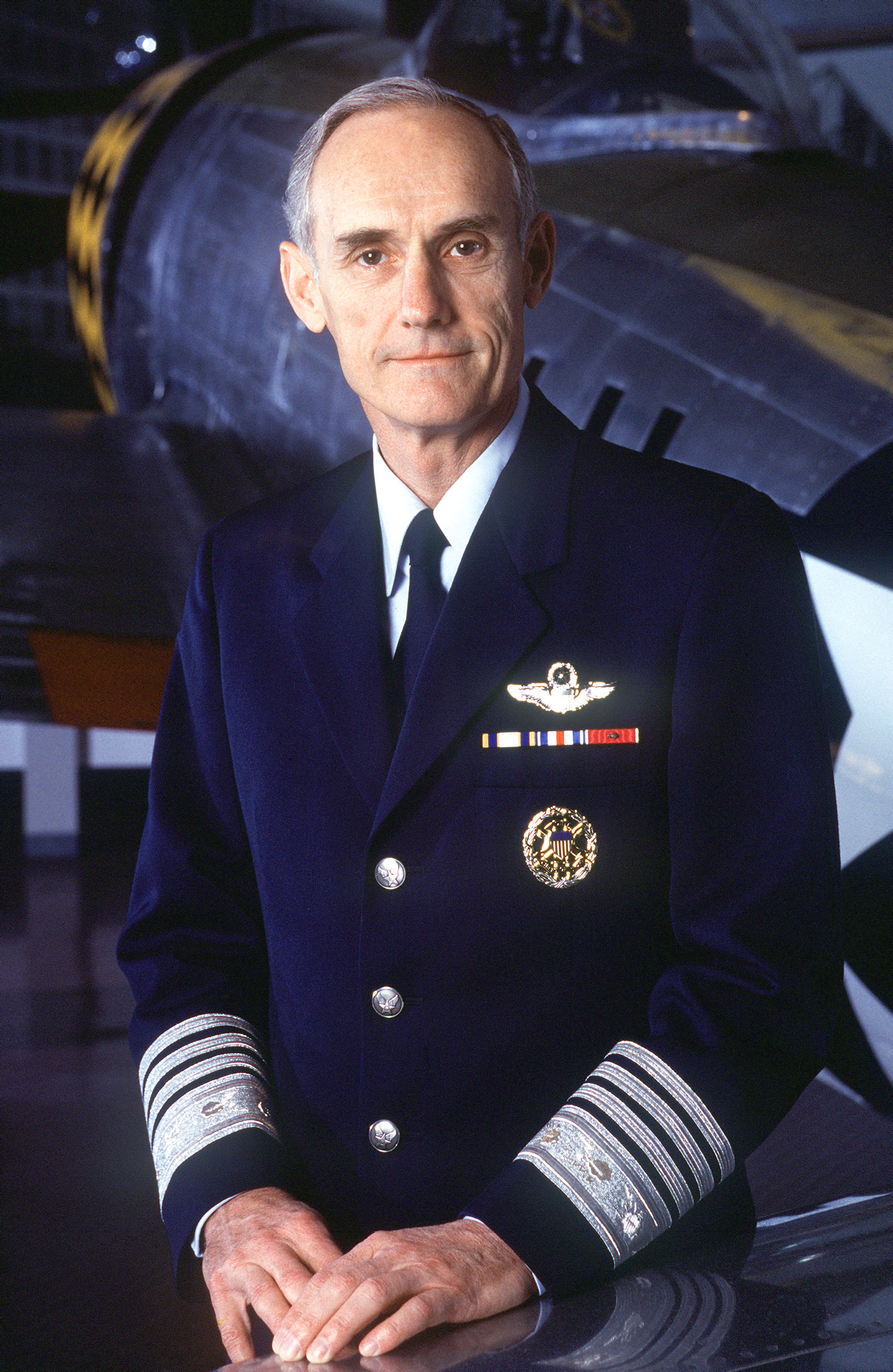
McPeak in 1993, wearing the redesigned Air Force Service Dress Uniform that was used from 1993 to 1994.

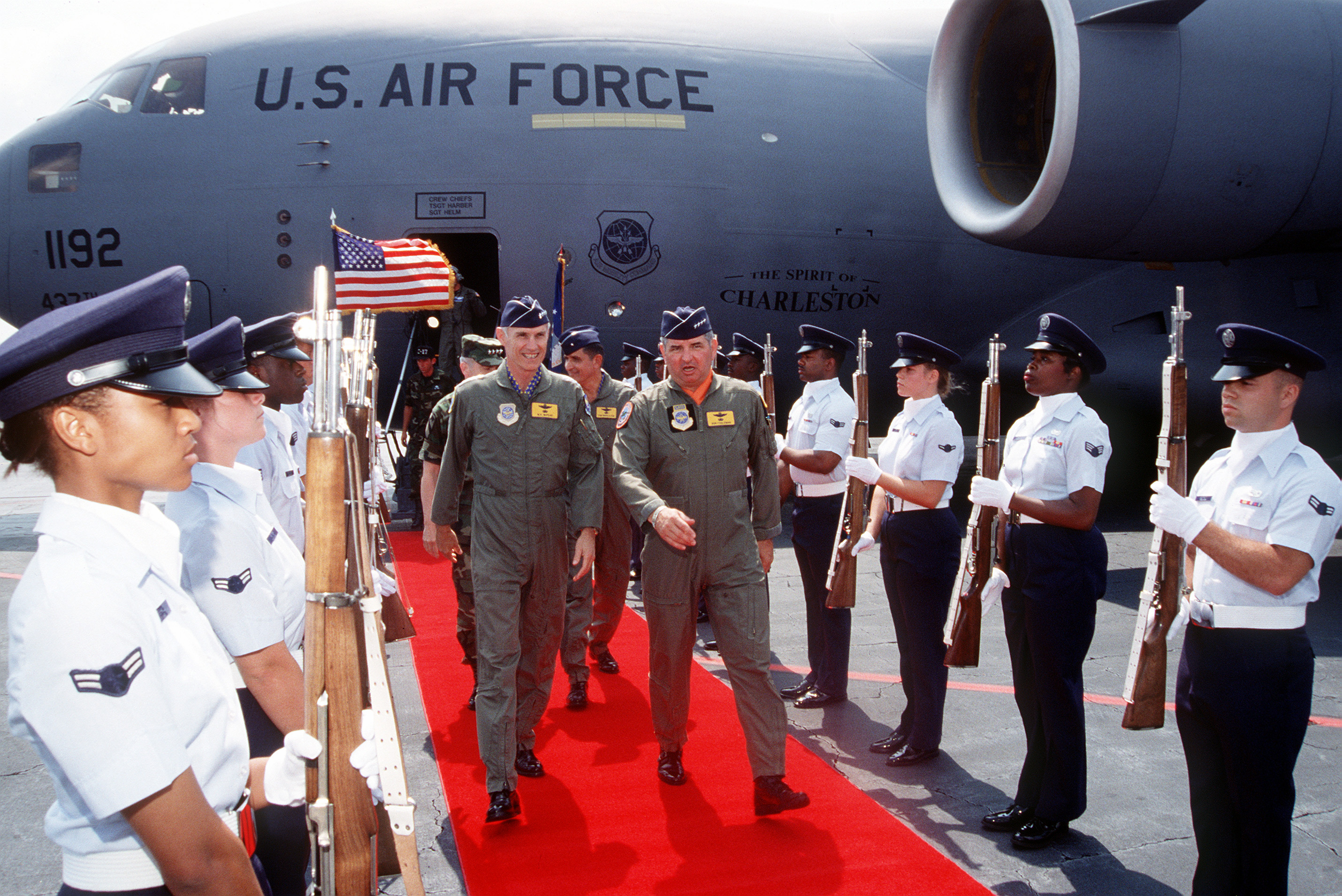
General Merrill McPeak and Air Mobility Command (AMC) Commander General Ronald Fogleman during the delivery of U.S. Air Force first Boeing C-17 Globemaster III (The Spirit of Charleston), at Charleston Air Force Base, South Carolina, June 14, 1993.

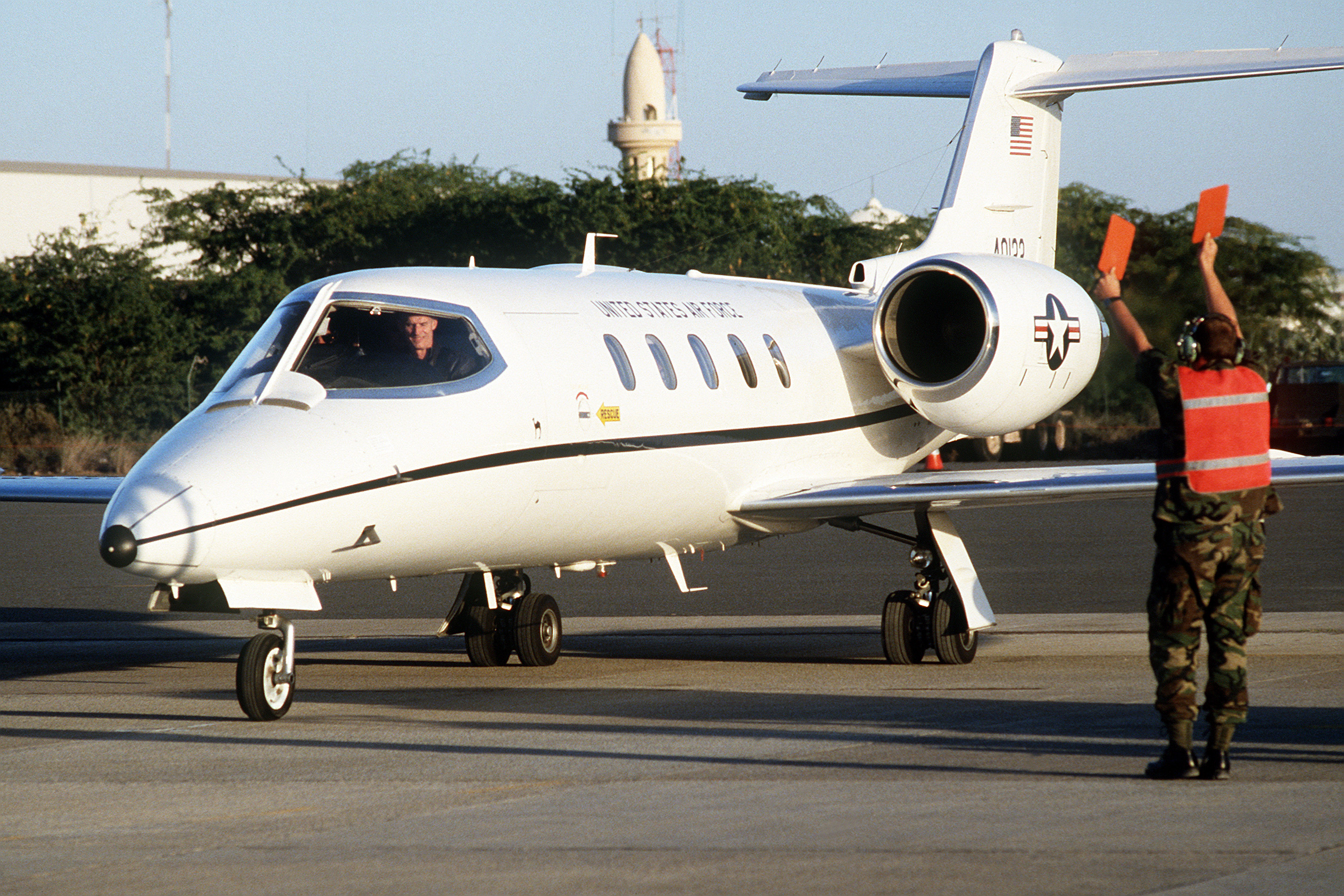
Air Force Chief of Staff General Merrill McPeak flying a U.S. Air Force Learjet C-21A, during a visit to Saudi Arabia on May 5, 1992.

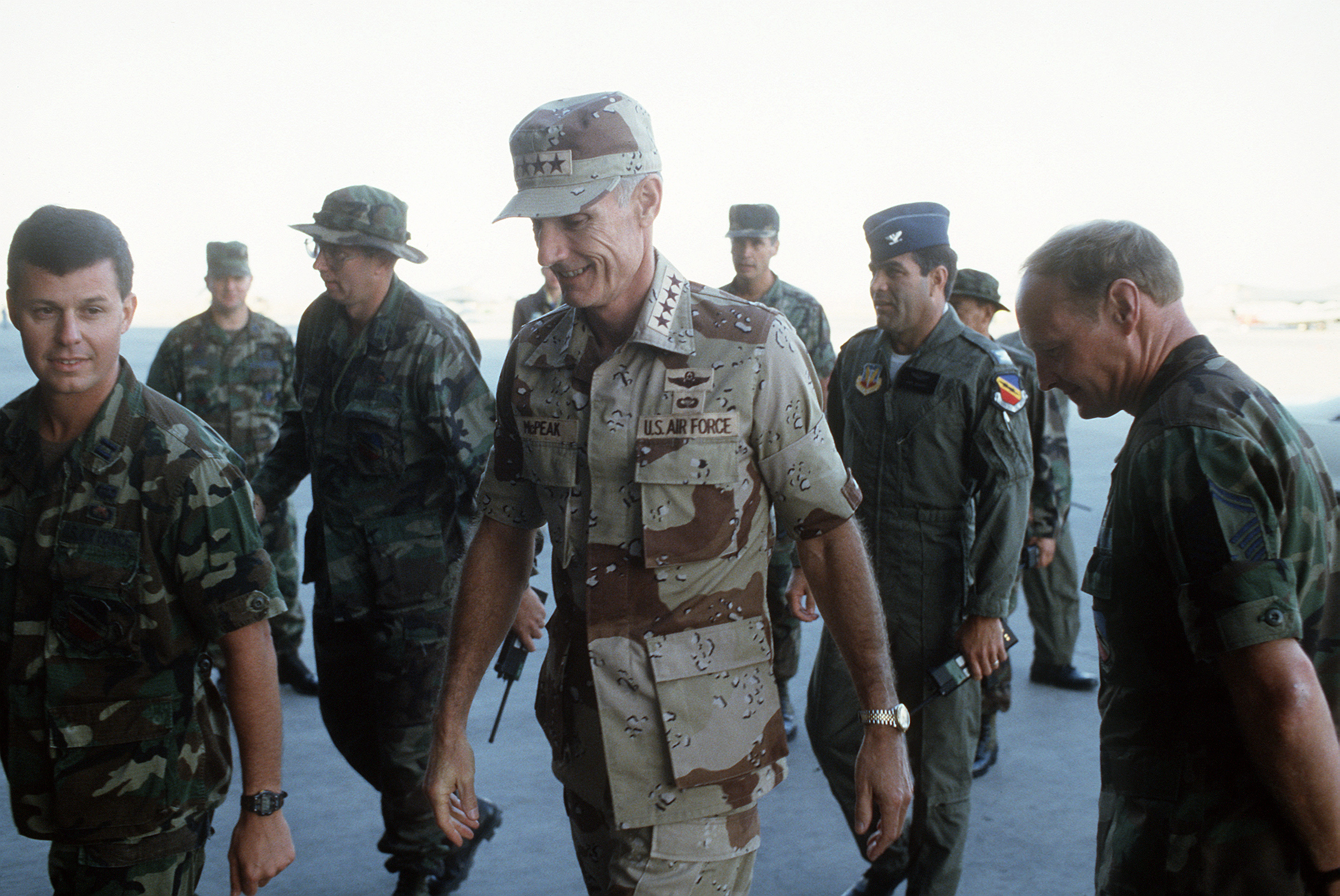
Air Force Chief of Staff General Merrill McPeak inspecting U.S. Air Force personnel deployed in the Middle East during Operation Desert Storm on May 5, 1991.

McPeak was appointed Air Force Chief of Staff by President George H. W. Bush in October 1990, replacing the retiring General Michael Dugan following the latter's removal from the CSAF post by SECDEF Dick Cheney for ill-timed and inappropriate comments to the news media regarding Iraq during Operation Desert Shield.

McPeak took over as chief of staff during Operation Desert Shield, and assisted in overall strategic planning for Operation Desert Storm.

McPeak's later tenure as chief of staff following the Gulf War also saw a major reduction in force in terms of aircraft, units, officers and enlisted airmen across the entire Air Force as a result of the end of the Cold War. During his time as chief of staff, he oversaw the disestablishment of Strategic Air Command (SAC), Tactical Air Command (TAC), Military Airlift Command (MAC), Air Force Systems Command (AFSC), Air Force Logistics Command (AFLC), and Air Force Communications Command (AFCC), with assets transferred primarily to the newly established Air Combat Command (ACC), Air Mobility Command (AMC), Air Force Materiel Command (AFMC) and the then-Air Force Communications Agency. His tenure also oversaw the merging of Air Training Command (ATC) and Air University (AU) into the Air Education and Training Command (AETC).

McPeak pushed through major organizational changes in the Air Force aimed at streamlining and emphasizing operations and combat readiness. Much of his tenure focused on elevating the status of flight operations, especially single-seat fighter pilots, some say at the expense of multi-seat fighter, bomber and reconnaissance aircraft and personnel, cargo and air refueling aircraft and personnel, and non-flying career fields. He also created the Air Force Expeditionary Wing concept, a fusion of combat forces and support into a single organization. He also transferred several flying wing and space wing command billets to brigadier generals, even though previously these had been commanded by colonels.

However, McPeak is best remembered by many current and since-retired Air Force personnel for the sweeping changes he made to the Air Force's service dress uniform, especially for commissioned officers. Worn by personnel during most garrison duties, the new version was a radical departure from the earlier version, which was essentially the same design as the then-U.S. Army service uniform (the U.S. Air Force was originally the U.S. Army Air Corps and then the U.S. Army Air Forces), but with fewer insignia and in blue. In addition to a new three-button design with fewer and non-buttoning pockets, it changed the rank insignia for officers to use naval-style sleeve stripes, as opposed to metal pins on shoulder straps. Because of the new uniform's resemblance to both commissioned officer's uniforms of the U.S. Navy and those of commercial airline pilots, the McPeak uniform was said to be unpopular with Air Force service members. Some uniform changes were subsequently reversed by his successor. The basic redesign continues to be worn to this day, but the navalized sleeve braid rank insignia was eliminated and shoulder straps with pin-on rank for officers reinstated. McPeak's original concept of simplifying and toning down the various devices and insignia pinned to the uniform has gone by the wayside, with nearly all USAF personnel wearing at least one, if not two, three or more metal insignia with their dress uniforms.

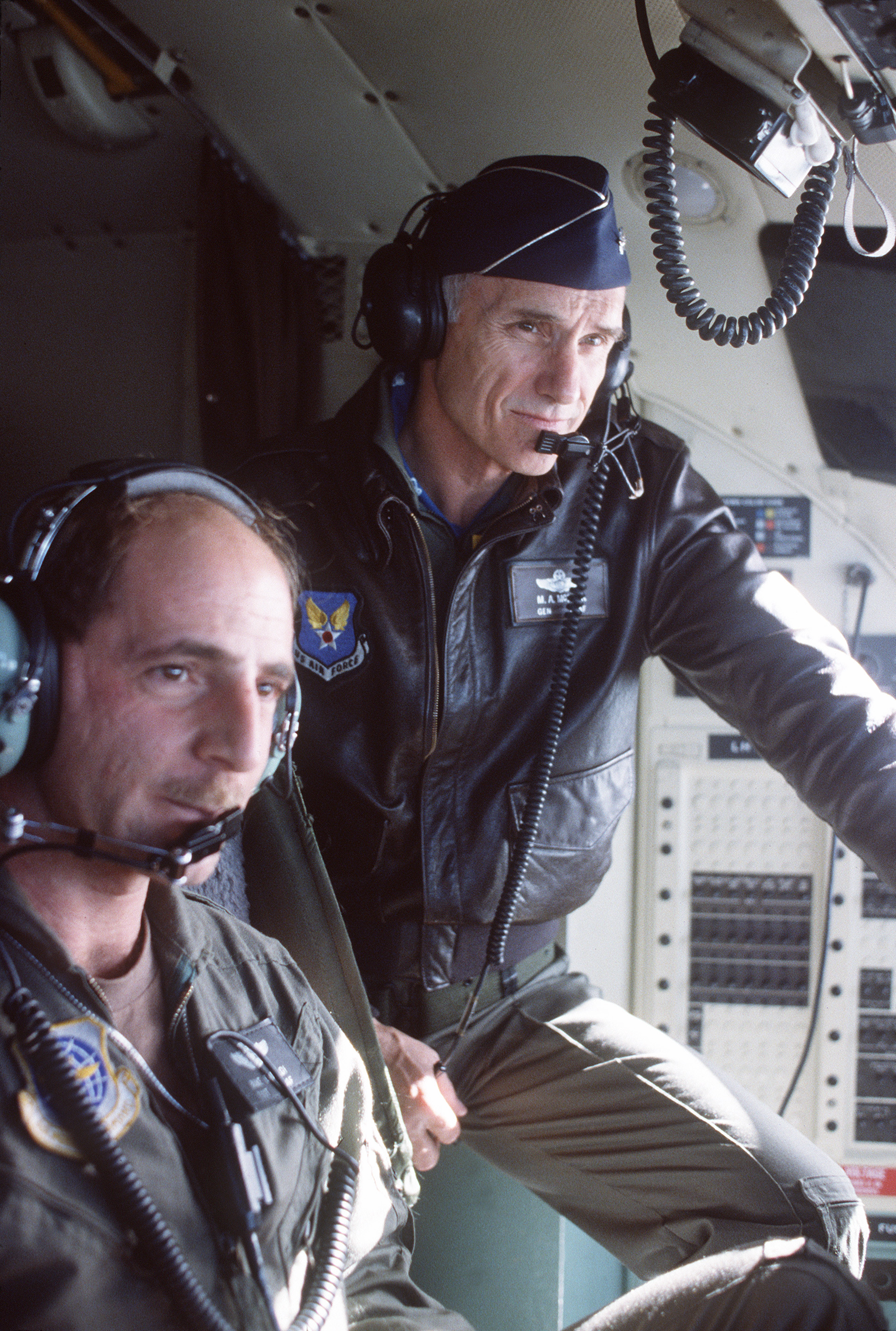
Air Force Chief of Staff General Merrill McPeak observes operations in the cockpit of Lockheed-Martin C-130 Hercules.

McPeak also acted as Secretary of the Air Force for three weeks in 1993, before the formal appointment and confirmation of Sheila E. Widnall, becoming the only person to have ever concurrently served in both capacities. McPeak continued as Chief of Staff through October 1994, retiring afterwards.

McPeak's legacy as Chief of Staff has been considered in several quarters as one of the most controversial in Air Force history and has been the subject of much debate. Many Air Force senior officers and senior enlisted personnel, both active and retired from the Regular Air Force, the Air Force Reserve and the Air National Guard, have accused him of trying to run the Air Force as a corporation, with his introduction of Total Quality Management (TQM) under the moniker of "Quality Air Force" (QAF).

Rightly or wrongly, McPeak was also often accused of ignoring the needs of enlisted personnel, non-flying officers, aeronautically-rated navigator officers, and looking out solely for his officers who were pilots, primarily single-seat fighter pilots. There was even debate over the somewhat traditional act of inducting him as the outgoing Chief of Staff into the Order of the Sword.

Some of this controversy may also be traced, at least in part, to the abrupt manner in which McPeak had replaced General Michael Dugan as Chief of Staff of the Air Force. General Dugan, a popular and well-intentioned officer, had sought to repair the Air Force's image, badly frayed by the service's withholding of embarrassing information about the performance of the F-117 Nighthawk during the invasion of Panama. Dugan had also sought to make top Air Force officials more accessible, but he was relieved of command by then-Secretary of Defense Dick Cheney shortly before the start of Operation Desert Storm and the first Gulf War following some intemperate remarks Dugan had made to the news media about targeting Iraqi leader Saddam Hussein under United Nations Security Council Resolution 666 prior to the start of hostilities, this despite the fact that as Air Force Chief of Staff, Dugan had no command authority within the U.S. Central Command theater of operations. In short order, Cheney quickly replaced Dugan with McPeak as Chief of Staff, although Dugan was retained as a 4-star special advisor by the Secretary of Defense until his retirement from the Air Force.

== Later work ==
Following his Air Force career, McPeak entered the private sector as a consultant and business executive. He has been on the boards of directors for TWA, ECC International, where he served for several years as Chairman, Tektronix, Sensis Corporation, Aerojet/Rocketdyne, Iovance Biotherapeutics, USIA Underwater Equipment Sales Corporation, and other corporations. He was a founding investor and for a decade Chairman of Ethicspoint, a Portland, Oregon-based software startup. When sold to private equity, it was perhaps Oregon's most successful startup in recent years. McPeak and his wife Elynor currently reside in Portland, Oregon. Ellie served for nine years as a member of the Lake Oswego City Council.

McPeak was appointed in July 2010 to the American Battle Monuments Commission. He was the tenth Chairman (and the first airman) to lead the commission. In 2018, the government of France decorated McPeak (Legion of Honor, Officer class) in connection with his prior service as U.S. Air Force Chief of Staff and in recognition of his Chairmanship of the American Battle Monuments Commission (ABMC). His leadership was essential in the restoration of the Lafayette Escadrille Memorial, outside Paris. The monument had fallen into disrepair, but has now been renovated and has become an ABMC property, ensuring its future maintenance. McPeak was a technical advisor to Ken Burns and Lynn Novick in their award-winning documentary, “The Vietnam War”. He appeared on-screen in 4 of the 10 episodes.

In 1992, San Diego State University gave its first ever Lifetime Achievement Award to General McPeak. In 1995, George Washington University honored him with its Distinguished Alumni Award, the "George." In 2005, on the occasion of the 150th anniversary of the founding of Sigma Chi Fraternity, he was selected as one of 150 members of its Hall of Fame. He was among the initial seven inductees to the Oregon Aviation Hall of Honor.

In May 2012, McPeak published Hangar Flying, the first volume of The Aerial View Trilogy, three memoirs that document his career in the Air Force. The book was followed by Volume 2, Below the Zone, in November 2013, and Volume 3, Roles and Missions, in January 2017.

=== Israel ===
McPeak was harshly criticized by American Spectator journalist Robert Goldberg for comments and writings he has made regarding Israel.

Goldberg begins the piece saying that "McPeak has a long history of criticizing Israel for not going back to the 1967 borders as part of any peace agreement with Arab states. In 1976 McPeak wrote an article for Foreign Affairs magazine questioning Israel's insistence on holding on to the Golan Heights and parts of the West Bank."

Goldberg writes that "[in] recent years McPeak has echoed the Mearsheimer-Walt view that American Middle East policy is being controlled by Jews at the expense of America's interests in the region." Goldberg then quotes McPeak responding to a question as to what is the cause for the lack of progress in getting Israelis and Palestinians together: "New York City. Miami. We have a large vote – vote, here in favor of Israel. And no politician wants to run against it."

Goldberg also wrote that McPeak "claims that a combination of Jews and Christian Zionists are manipulating U.S. policy in Iraq in dangerous and radical ways."To support this claim, Goldberg quotes McPeak from a published interview: "Let's say that one of your abiding concerns is the security of Israel as opposed to a purely American self-interest, then it would make sense to build a dozen or so bases in Iraq. Let's say you are a born-again Christian and you think that Armageddon and the rapture are about to happen any minute and what you want to do is retrace steps you think are laid out in Revelations, then it makes sense. So there are a number of scenarios here that could lead you in this direction. This is radical...."

==== McPeak's response ====
More than 30 years ago, ... I wrote, and Foreign Affairs published, an article now being circulated in the blogosphere as evidence of an alleged anti-Israel point of view. Some commentators reach farther, suggesting that since I have been an active supporter of Barack Obama's presidential bid he, too, is anti-Israel. Both these assertions fall flat after any objective reading of the historical record.

I am a long-time admirer (and think myself a friend) of Israel. In the early 1970s, I played a key role in getting advanced weaponry released to the Israeli Air Force – capabilities it later put to active use. During that period, I made many official visits to Israel and established close relationships there. These contacts turned out to be useful during Operation Desert Storm, when, as chief of staff of the U.S. Air Force, I worked with my Israeli counterparts to help defend Israel from Iraqi Scud missile attacks.

I was a vocal opponent of the George W. Bush Administration's decision to invade Iraq, a strategic blunder made worse by slapdash execution. As we have seen, this star-crossed action took our eye off the ball in Afghanistan, breathed new life into a moribund al Qaeda, and enhanced Iranian influence in this critical region – all outcomes which damaged both the United States and our ally Israel.

It is my view and hope that Israel will have our continued support. I wish it every success. Of course, what Israel regards as success is up to it to decide. But for friends like me, "success" means a secure Israel at peace with neighbors who recognize and respect its existence. Even so, we should maintain our special relationship and help Israel keep its qualitative military edge.

As for the article, much has changed in 32 years and much has not. The essential argument holds: no set of realistically achievable geographic borders produces safety for Israel. Rather, the security requirement is that any of the territory taken in the Six-Day War and given back as part of a peace settlement should be effectively demilitarized. Of course, the Sinai Peninsula was returned to Egypt long ago in exactly this way, resulting in relative quiet along Israel's southern border and creating a fundamental shift in the regional balance of forces. This opportunity was not skillfully exploited, so the result has been a "cold peace." But it is nevertheless peace and has served the interests of both sides.

=== Political activities ===
In 1996, McPeak served as Oregon state chairman for the Bob Dole for president campaign. During the presidential election of 2000 McPeak endorsed George W. Bush and served as co-chairman of Oregon Veterans for Bush. As the military and foreign policy of the Bush administration coalesced, however, McPeak expressed strong objections, especially with regard to the 2003 invasion of Iraq. McPeak later openly campaigned for Howard Dean's nomination, and when Dean withdrew, acted as an adviser for the John Kerry campaign. He was also one of twenty-seven signatories to the statement of the "Committee of Diplomats & Commanders for Change" calling the Bush administration a failure at "preserving national security" and calling for Bush not to be re-elected.

McPeak was a co-chair of Barack Obama's 2008 presidential campaign. He generated controversy following comments he made at a campaign appearance in Medford, Oregon, where he implied that former president Bill Clinton had appeared to question Obama's patriotism: "As one who for 37 years proudly wore the uniform of our country, I'm saddened to see a president employ these tactics. He of all people should know better because he was the target of exactly the same kind of tactics." McPeak also compared the former President's comments to McCarthyism: "I grew up, I was going to college when Joe McCarthy was accusing good Americans of being traitors, so I've had enough of it."

=== East Timor ===
According to journalist Allan Nairn, General McPeak oversaw the delivery of advanced U.S. fighter planes to Suharto's government not long after the November 1991 shooting of pro-independence demonstrators known as the Dili massacre.

== Dates of rank ==
Dates of Rank
Insignia	Rank	Date
	Gen	Aug. 1, 1988
	Lt Gen	May 22, 1985
	Maj Gen	Oct. 1, 1983
	Brig Gen	July 1, 1981
	Col	April 1, 1974
	Lt Col	Nov. 1, 1972
	Maj	May 20, 1968
	Capt	Oct. 1, 1962
	1st Lt	May 30, 1959
	2nd Lt	June 19, 1957

== Awards and decorations ==
McPeak's military decorations include the:

Command Pilot Badge
Basic Parachutist Badge
Office of the Joint Chiefs of Staff Identification Badge
Defense Distinguished Service Medal
Air Force Distinguished Service Medal with oak leaf cluster
Silver Star
Legion of Merit with oak leaf cluster
Distinguished Flying Cross with oak leaf cluster
Meritorious Service Medal
Air Medal (13 olc)
Air Force Commendation Medal (3 olc)
Air Force Outstanding Unit Award
Air Force Organizational Excellence Award
Combat Readiness Medal
National Defense Service Medal with star
Vietnam Service Medal with 4 service stars
Air Force Overseas Service Ribbon Short Tour
Air Force Overseas Service Ribbon Long Tour with 2 oak leaves
Air Force Longevity Service Award (1 silver olc and 3 bronze olc)
Air Force Expert Marksmanship Ribbon
Republic of Vietnam Gallantry Cross
Vietnam Campaign Medal

Qualification badges include the Command Pilot Badge, the Parachutist Badge, and the Office of the Joint Chiefs of Staff Identification Badge.

Military offices
Preceded by John M. Loh; Acting	Chief of Staff of the United States Air Force; 1990–1994	Succeeded by Ronald R. Fogleman
Political offices
Preceded by Michael B. Donley; Acting	United States Secretary of the Air Force; Acting; 1993	Succeeded by Sheila E. Widnall
