= Common Assessment Framework =

The Common Assessment Framework (CAF) is the common European quality management instrument for the public sector. It is a free tool to assist public sector organisations to improve their performance. The CAF helps the organisations to perform a self-assessment with the involvement of all staff, to develop an improvement plan based on the results of the self-assessment and to implement the improvement actions. The model "is based on the premise that excellent results in organisational performance, citizens/customers, people and society are achieved through leadership driving strategy and planning, people, partnerships and resources, and processes. It looks at the organisation from different angles at the same time, the holistic approach of organisation performance analysis." On 7 September 2011, 2382 public sector organisations from 43 different nationalities or from the EU institutions were registered as CAF users in the CAF Database.

The CAF Model is derived from the EFQM Excellence Model and shares the same 9 criteria.

== Origin and evolution ==
In 1998, discussions amongst the Directors-General of the Public Administration of the EU Member States in the European Public Administration Network (EUPAN) revealed that there was a need for a common European quality framework that could be used across the public sector as a tool for organisational self-assessment. As a consequence of this, it was decided that this quality framework should be jointly developed under the aegis of the Innovative Public Services Group (IPSG), an informal working group of national experts set up by the Directors General of the EUPAN network. The first version of the CAF was then developed in 1998 and 1999 by the IPSG and with the support of the European Foundation of Quality Management (EFQM), the Speyer Academy (which organised the Speyer Quality Award for the public sector in the German-speaking European countries) and the European Institute of Public Administration (EIPA).

The CAF model was launched in 2000 at the 1st European Quality Conference in Lisbon. A European CAF Resource Centre was established in 2001 at EIPA in Maastricht to serve as a centre of expertise in CAF implementation, to provide training and consultancy, to support the Member States in disseminating the CAF and to further develop the model. The first two years of CAF were evaluated with a study on the use of the CAF. The results led to the CAF 2002, an improved version of the model, which was presented at the 2nd European Quality Conference in Denmark. In 2005, a new study on the use of the CAF was conducted. A number of areas in the CAF needed further improvement: increase the coherence and simplicity of the model, increase the user friendliness by improving the examples and the glossary, develop a more fine‐tuned scoring system for certain users, and broaden the quality approach with directives for the improvement action plans and guidelines for bench learning. The CAF was improved for the second time in 2006. The new CAF 2006 was presented at the 4th European Quality Conference in Finland. In 2009 and 2010 followed a procedure for external feedback on the CAF implementation in the organisation and a tailor-made version of the CAF for the education sector.

Until today, the CAF 2006 is the most recent version of the CAF model. A new revision of the model is planned for 2012 and will be based on the results of a study conducted during the first half of 2011.

Year	Event
1998	Agreement on the development of the CAF within the EUPAN network
2000	Launch of the CAF
2001	Creation of the European CAF Resource Centre at EIPA (European Institute of Public Administration) - Maastricht
2002	First revision of the model: Launch of the CAF 2002
2006	Second revision of the model: Launch of the CAF 2006
2009	Launch of the Procedure on External Feedback and the Effective CAF User label
2010	Launch of the CAF and Education version

== Purpose ==
The CAF has four main purposes:

1. To introduce public administrations to the principles of TQM and gradually guide them, through the use and understanding of self-assessment, from the current “Plan-Do” sequence of activities to a full-fledged “Plan-Do-Check-Act (PDCA)” cycle;
2. To facilitate the self-assessment of a public organisation in order to arrive at a diagnosis and improvement actions;
3. To act as a bridge across the various models used in quality management;
4. To facilitate bench learning between public-sector organisations.

== CAF model structure ==
The Common Assessment Framework is based on eight principles, "the principles of excellence". These eight principles are:

1. Results orientation
2. Citizen/Customer focus
3. Leadership & constancy of purpose
4. Management of processes & facts
5. Involvement of people
6. Continuous improvement & innovation
7. Mutually beneficial partnerships
8. Corporate social responsibility

The CAF has nine criteria representing the main aspects requiring consideration in any organisational analysis. There are five enabler-criteria (Leadership, Strategy & Planning, People, Partnerships & Resources and Processes) and four result-criteria (Citizen/Customer Oriented Results, People Results, Society Results and Key Performance Results). The Enablers cover what an organisation does. The Results cover what an organisation achieves. By performing a self-assessment with the CAF, public sector organisations can find areas for improvement in the functioning of the organisation and in pursuing the desired results.

The CAF is especially designed for the public sector. As a matter of a fact, this focus is what distinguishes the CAF from the EFQM Excellence model.

Public management and quality in the public sector have a number of special unique conditions in comparison with the private sector. They presume basic preconditions, common to our European socio-political and administrative culture: legitimacy (democratic parliamentary), the rule of law and ethical behaviour based on common values and principles such as openness, accountability, participation, diversity, equity, social justice, solidarity, collaboration and partnerships.

The 9 criteria of the CAF model are further broken down in 28 sub-criteria. These sub-criteria identify the main issues that need to be considered when assessing a public sector organisation. Each sub-criterion is illustrated by a series of examples that explain its content.
