= Cooley's Anemia Foundation =

American nonprofit organization

- Formation: 1954
- Founder: Frank Ficarra
- Founded at: Brooklyn, New York
- Purpose: Funds medical research and education to benefit individuals living with thalassemia
- Website: thalassemia.org

Cooley’s Anemia Foundation (CAF) is an American 501(c)(3) nonprofit organization that funds medical research and education to benefit individuals living with the genetic blood disorder thalassemia. The major form of this disorder is also known as Cooley's anemia.

== History ==
Established in 1954, the foundation was conceived by its founder, Frank Ficarra, the father of two children who were born with thalassemia. Although the Foundation was founded in Brooklyn, New York, it has expanded its scope to include patients from across the United States.

== Medical research ==
The Foundation supports medical research with the goal of improving treatment and finding a cure. Medical research considered for funding includes clinical trials in cell and gene therapies, and ongoing clinical projects with a focus on iron overload, cardiac complications, family planning, and psycho-social effects. In addition, fellowships are offered to clinical and basic science investigators (postdoctoral or junior faculty) with an interest in thalassemia or research with a direct application to thalassemia and/or its complications.

In 2014, the Foundation awarded $300,000 in medical research funding. All applications are examined and discussed by a Medical Review Committee, composed of individuals with expertise in various aspects of thalassemia research and treatment.

Among the many areas in which the Foundation has supported research are the mechanisms of iron regulation, gene editing, and gene therapy as potential curative approaches to thalassemia; vector development; nutritional requirements in thalassemia; strategies for improving adherence to thalassemia treatments; fertility and pregnancy in thalassemia; cardiac issues in thalassemia; pulmonary hypertension; fetal hemoglobin production; and approaches to iron chelation therapy.

Published medical research funded in whole or in part by the Foundation includes:

- "A mechanism for the specific immunogenicity of heat shock protein-chaperoned peptides" by R Suto, PK Srivastava
- "The Development of Iron Chelators for Clinical Use" by Raymond J. Bergeron, Gary M. Brittenham

== Symposia with the New York Academy of Sciences ==
Since 1964, the Foundation has partnered with the New York Academy of Sciences to present periodic symposia specifically focusing on the current status and future directions of clinical care and research in the area of thalassemia. As of 2014, nine of these Cooley's Anemia Symposia have been presented; the tenth is currently scheduled for October, 2015.

These Symposia bring together experts in thalassemia from around the world and offer an opportunity for clinicians, scientists, nurses and others involved in thalassemia care and research to share information and learn about up-to-date therapies and strategies that can have a current and future impact on patient care.

== Collaborative work with government agencies ==
The Foundation makes a priority of educating and informing government agencies and officials about the needs of the thalassemia community.

- The Thalassemia Clinical Research Network (TCRN). This 10-year project was funded by the National Heart, Lung, and Blood Institute (NHLBI) and launched in 1998. The goal of the TCRN was to provide a national structure to conduct clinical studies in thalassemia. Experts from some of the nation's leading thalassemia treatment centers participated in this project. The Foundation played a significant role in establishing the need for this major project.
- Centers for Disease Control and Prevention (CDC). The CDC has launched a number of thalassemia-based initiatives in recent years; the Foundation has helped to relay much of the information which contributed to the initiation of many of these projects. In 2004, the CDC began an eight-year Thalassemia Data and Blood Specimen Collection Project which responded to concerns about the need to identify possible pathogens in the blood supply as quickly as possible. (Due to the frequency with which thalassemia patients receive red blood cell transfusions, this is a substantial concern for the thalassemia community.) The CDC also has funded a Thalassemia Prevention Education and Outreach project, which was awarded to the Foundation under a cooperative agreement with the CDC. This project helps to educate individuals with thalassemia with evidence-based public health messages that can have a positive impact on health outcomes. Several thalassemia treatment centers have also received funding from the CDC as part of the Center's Prevention of Complications in Thalassemia project.
- The Food and Drug Administration (FDA). When a new treatment for thalassemia is submitted to the FDA for review, the Foundation makes certain that the concerns of the thalassemia community are made known.

== Patient services ==
Patient programs are a major component of the Foundation's activities. As a lifelong disorder, individuals born with thalassemia face a wide range of challenges from infancy onward. With advances in treatment resulting in a significant expansion of life expectancy, patients are discovering new challenges in adulthood which earlier generations of patients did not face.

The Foundation provides a patient services department to help patients and family members learn about the disorder and its challenges and to provide them with information that can have a positive impact on meeting thalassemia-related challenges. Among the services offered by the Foundation are:

- An annual Patient-Family Conference. The Patient-Family Conference gives members of the thalassemia community an opportunity to get together with other patients and family members in order to hear up-to-date information from doctors, nurses and scientists with significant experience in thalassemia. In addition, patients and family members share their own experiences and establish relationships that can help them devise ways to overcome difficulties they may be facing.
- Patient services manager. This staff member works closely with patients and family members to help answer a wide range of questions related to the disorder. The patient services manager also provides assistance on issues such as navigating complicated insurance questions and seeking out sources of assistance with high co-payments.
- CAF social worker. The Foundation engages an on-staff social worker to assist patients and family members develop strategies to help them better cope with issues related to thalassemia.
- Patient outreach director. The Foundation is committed to reaching as many individuals with thalassemia as possible and making available to them information sufficient to properly managing their thalassemia. The patient outreach director devises strategies for identifying new patients and for maintaining appropriate communications with patients and family members on the CAF database.
