= Café (2014 film) =

2014 Mexican documentary

- Directed by: Hatuey Viveros Lavielle
- Written by: Monika Revilla
- Produced by: Carlos Hernández Vázquez
- Cinematography: Hatuey Viveros Lavielle
- Edited by: Pedro García
- Music by: Carlo Ayhllón
- Release date: 2014
- Running time: 80 minutes
- Country: Mexico
- Language: Nahuatl

Café, also known as Coffee, is a Mexican documentary directed by Hatuey Viveros Lavielle which won the Sesterce d’or for Best Documentary at the Visions du Réel Film Festival in Switzerland. The film is spoken in Nahuatl.

== Plot ==
Café follows an indigenous family from the mountainous region of Puebla in Mexico as they struggle to overcome the loss of Antonio, the father. Teresa, the mother, will try to help her children with their current challenges. Jorge seeks to become the first lawyer in the area and sixteen year old Rosario will have to make a decision concerning her unwanted pregnancy.

== Prizes ==
Café received the Sesterce d'or for Best Documentary at the 2014 Visions du Réel Film Festival in Switzerland. It also won Best Documentary at the Biarritz International Festival of Latin American Cinema and the Reveu Sequence Prize at the Montreal First Peoples Festival. In 2015, it was screened at Docs Fortnight at the MoMA in New York.

== About the movie ==
The father of director Hatuey Viveros Lavielle and Antonio, the deceased father of the family portrayed, were close friends. Viveros Lavielle has known the family for most of his life and that is how he managed to obtain such close intimacy with his subject during the filming process.
