= The Coffee Shop (New York City) =

Defunct restaurant

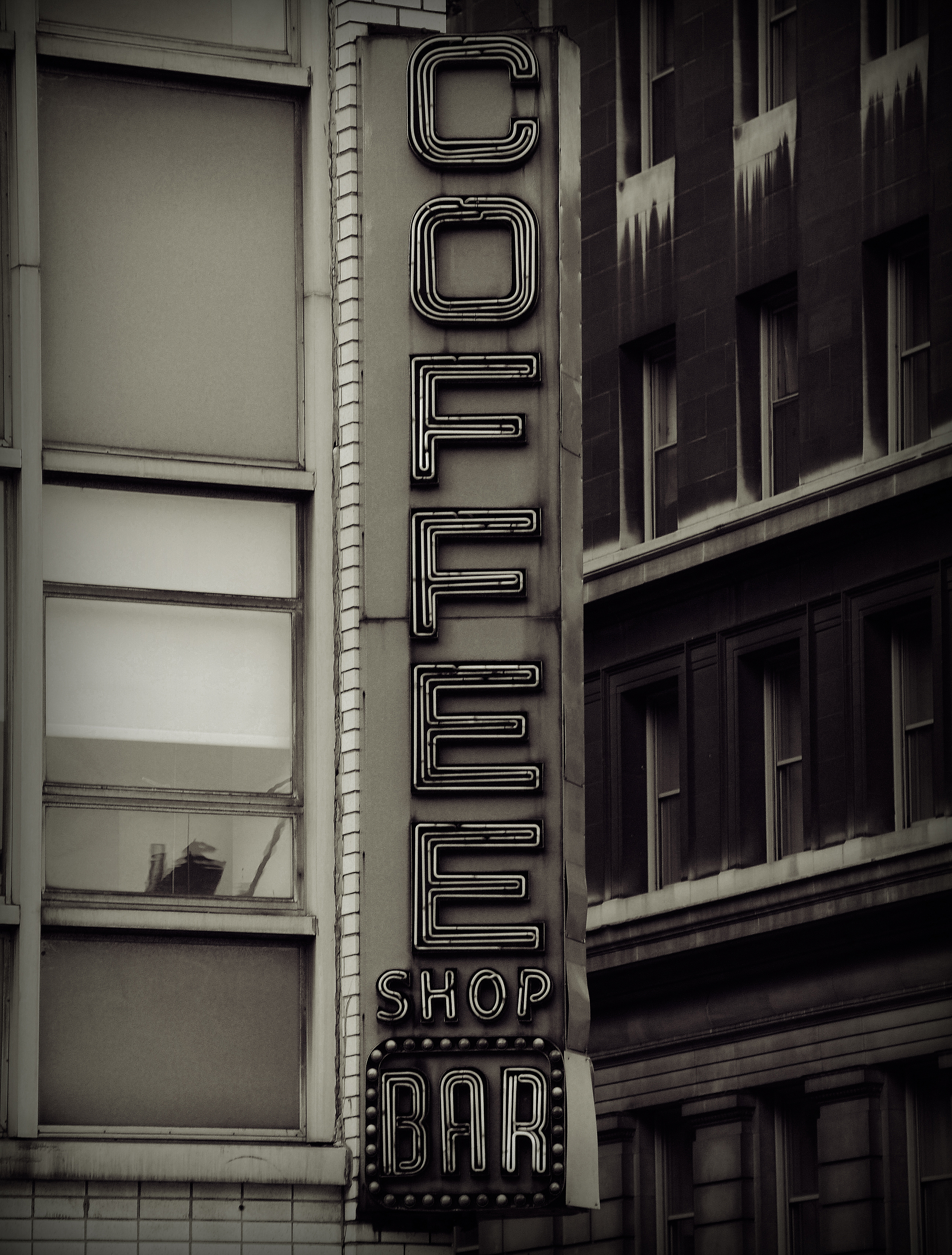
- The Coffee Shop in 2008
- Interactive map of The Coffee Shop

Restaurant information
- Established: 1990
- Closed: 2018
- Location: 29 Union Square West, New York City, 10003
- Coordinates: 40°44′11.5″N 73°59′27.5″W

The Coffee Shop (or Coffee Shop) was a restaurant and bar located next to Union Square in New York City. The restaurant opened in 1990 and closed in 2018. It served Brazilian food.

== History ==
=== Site and operating history ===
Before The Coffee Shop opened, the building was home to a coffee shop and cafe called Chase. The owners of Chase had placed a large neon sign outside the building reading "Coffee Shop" and the new tenant took its name from the sign and left it attached to the building. The tenant of the space occupied by the restaurant directly before it opened was a diner, Nick’s Coffee Shop. The Coffee Shop opened in 1990. Russell Simmons hosted his 1992 birthday at the restaurant. In 1993, the Coffee Shop changed part of its space into a venue for private parties.

The New York City Department of Health ordered the restaurant to close for a period in 2007 after it failed an inspection. In 2015, the restaurant's owners opened a taco restaurant, Taco Shop, in the space next to The Coffee Shop.

=== Closure ===
In mid-2018, the restaurant's owners announced it would close in October 2018. It is one of several restaurants on Union Square that have closed due to rising rents. The restaurant hosted a final party before its closure. Portions of the space formerly occupied by the restaurant were rented to a Chase Bank branch and a location of the vegan food chain By Chloe.

=== Reputation and staff ===
The restaurant was known for being popular with celebrities and members of New York's fashion scene. Several notable former members of the Coffee Shop's staff include dancer Emery LeCrone, politician Alexandria Ocasio-Cortez, and actress Maya Rudolph.

== Menu and offerings ==
The restaurant served what the New York Times characterized as "vaguely Brazilian food". The New Yorker referred to the menu as "Brazilian-inspired". The restaurant served drinks made with cachaça.
