= Das Kaffeehaus =

Das Kaffehaus
- Interactive map of Das Kaffehaus

Restaurant information
- Established: 2003 (as Coffee Basics), 2015 (also as Das Kaffeehaus)
- Food type: Austrian
- Location: 9 Walker Street, Castlemaine, Victoria, Australia
- Coordinates: 37.056258°S 144.213640°E
- Website: coffeebasics.com

Das Kaffeehaus is a Viennese-style café and coffee house in Castlemaine, Victoria, Australia. Operated by Austrian-born couple Elna Schaerf-Trauner and Edmund Schaerf in conjunction with their coffee-roasting business, Coffee Basics, it is based on the traditional coffee-house culture of Vienna and serves Austrian and other Central European food alongside coffee roasted on the premises. Since 2015, Das Kaffeehaus has occupied part of the former Castlemaine Woollen Mill, now known as The Mill, opposite the Castlemaine Botanical Gardens.

== History ==
Elna Schaerf-Trauner and Edmund Schaerf emigrated from Austria to Australia and settled in the Victorian goldfields region in the late 1980s. Before emigrating, both had worked at Daniel Moser, a historic Viennese coffee house associated with Edmund's family. Edmund learned the coffee-roasting trade there, while Elna worked as a coffee maker. Their experience of Vienna's coffee houses, which traditionally served as important social and cultural meeting places, later provided the inspiration for their business in Castlemaine.

The couple established Coffee Basics in Castlemaine in 2003, operating from the former Castlemaine Hospital. Coffee was roasted on the premises, with the building's chimney providing ventilation for the roasting operation. Alongside the roastery, the Schaerfs developed a café drawing upon the food and coffee traditions of their native Austria.

The Castlemaine business also became associated with the promotion of Viennese coffee culture in Australia. While Coffee Basics was still operating from the former hospital, the Austrian National Tourist Office brought a group of Australian food and travel writers to Castlemaine for an event showcasing Vienna's coffee-house tradition. The program included characteristic Viennese offerings such as kleiner Mokka and Apfelstrudel, using the Schaerfs' café and roastery as an Australian setting in which to present the tradition.

The Schaerfs nevertheless envisaged a larger establishment that would more closely resemble the grand coffee houses of Vienna. Their attention turned to the former Castlemaine Woollen Mill, a nineteenth-century industrial complex that was being redeveloped as a food, retail and creative precinct. Its prominent brick chimney was particularly useful for the roasting operation, while the scale of the former industrial interiors provided room for the more ambitious coffee house they had envisioned.

Coffee Basics' roasting equipment was installed in the mill's former boiler room, and in 2015 the café relocated from the old hospital to The Mill as Das Kaffeehaus. The new premises brought the roastery and a purpose-designed Viennese-style coffee house together within the same complex.

The interior was designed by Austrian theatre designer Ulrike Barbara von Radicevic, a friend of Schaerf-Trauner. Her design combined the industrial character of the 1875 woollen mill with elements associated with the grand coffee houses of nineteenth-century Vienna. Exposed brick walls and tall factory windows were complemented by marble-topped tables, red leather seating, gilt-framed mirrors and a large glass chandelier above a circular gold-coloured banquette. Art Nouveau references were incorporated into the timberwork, while artworks and decorations evoke Austrian history, opera, the Habsburg monarchy and Vienna's historical connections with the Ottoman Empire.

Coffee roasting has remained central to the establishment. The adjoining Coffee Basics roastery uses small-batch roasting, with its equipment housed in the former mill boiler room. Das Kaffeehaus consequently combines the Schaerfs' coffee-roasting business with their interpretation of the social and culinary traditions of the Viennese coffee house.

== Menu ==
Das Kaffeehaus serves food based primarily on Austrian and Central European cuisine, with dishes including Wiener schnitzel, goulash, Austrian sausages, baked quark soufflé, millet porridge and Apfelstrudel. Its coffee menu similarly draws on Viennese traditions, including Wiener Melange and several styles of Mokka. The Daniel Moser, consisting of espresso layered over condensed milk, is named after the Viennese coffee house where Schaerf-Trauner and Schaerf worked before emigrating to Australia.

== See also ==
- Buda Historic Home & Garden
