= Quality Air Force =

Quality Air Force (QAF) was an initiative inside the United States Air Force in the 1990s that attempted to apply quality control to all activities. The effort was associated with General Merrill McPeak.

Quality control had been developed to help industrial manufacturers increase profits by reducing waste and producing consistent, defect-free physical goods. Most Air Force personnel could not figure out how to apply the techniques of manufacturing's quality control to most of the duties of their Air Force missions, which are often human services depending upon individual skills, with little repetition and numerous exceptions, and difficult to measure in physical terms.

In order to be competitive for promotions it became a requirement for airmen to show that they were executing Quality Air Force in their duties and using it to show improvements.

The Air University Press printed books on QAF subjects that were distributed to airmen worldwide.
