= Calcium(I) fluoride =

Names
- Other names Calcium monofluoride

Identifiers
CAS Number	13827-26-4
3D model (JSmol)	Interactive image
ChemSpider	29330170
- InChI: InChI=1S/Ca.FH/h;1H/q+1;/p-1 Key: PMJVACMPRFHIPZ-UHFFFAOYSA-M
- SMILES: [Ca]F

Properties
Chemical formula	CaF
Appearance	black crystals
Density	3.6 g/cm^{3}
Melting point	902
- Except where otherwise noted, data are given for materials in their standard state (at 25 °C [77 °F], 100 kPa). Infobox references

Calcium(I) fluoride is an unstable inorganic chemical compound with the chemical formula CaF. It can exist as a high temperature gas, or an isolated molecule in a solid noble gas matrix.
