= Electrochemical migration =

Electrochemical migration (ECM) is the dissolution and movement of metal ions in presence of electric potential, which results in the growth of dendritic structures between anode and cathode. The process is most commonly observed in printed circuit boards where it may significantly decrease the insulation between conductors.

The main factor facilitating the ECM is humidity. In the presence of water, ECM can grow very quickly. Usually the process involves several stages: water adsorption, anode metal dissolution, ion accumulation, ion migration to cathode, and dendritic growth. The growth of the dendrite takes a fraction of a second, during which time the resistance between anode and cathode drops almost to zero.

== Characteristics ==
In addition to the electrical potential difference, the presence of moisture is a driving factor in the ECM. If there is a sufficient film of moisture with condensation and even at low electrical voltage, the ECM can form a bridging structure between the contacts after just a few minutes.

In general, the process can be broken down into the following steps:

- Adsorption of water through condensation on the surface between the contacts (often promoted by hygroscopic ionic impurities)
- Alkalization of the water due to the applied potential difference and thus lowering of the pH value in the water film (initiates the corrosion of (contact) metallizations e.g. silver, copper, tin)
- Dissolution of the anode material (silver, copper, tin etc.)
- Migration of the metal cations to the cathode
- Reduction of the migrated cations and deposition on the cathode with the formation of a metallic dendrite
- Dendrite growth in the opposite direction, towards the anode
- Reduction of the resistance between the contacts up to a permanent short circuit
- There is also bridge formation through interaction with impurities, such as NaCl that run from the anode to the cathode

This mechanism impairs the reliability and longevity of electronic assemblies. This means that electrochemical migration is often the focus of failure root cause analyses as a possible trigger for malfunctions in the field.

== See also ==
- Whisker (metallurgy)
