= Kofe Khauz =

Russian-Ukrainian coffee shop chain

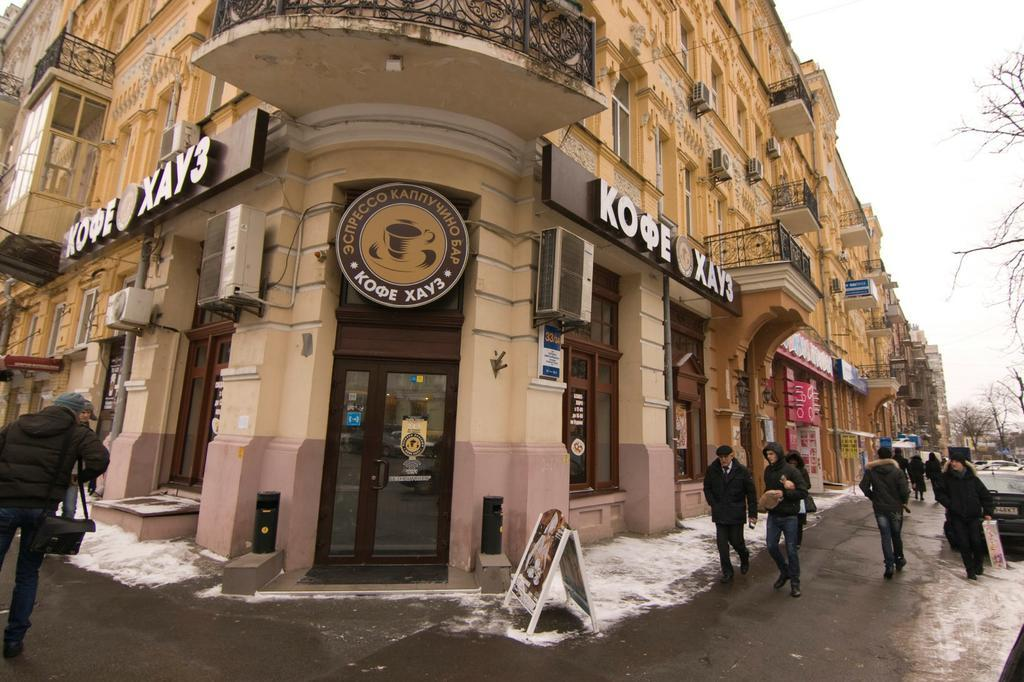
- A Kofe Khauz store in Kyiv, Ukraine
- Industry: Retail Coffee
- Headquarters: Moscow
- Website: www.coffeehouse.ru

Kofe Khauz (Кофе Хауз, Coffee House) is a chain of coffee shops in Russia and Ukraine. The company has currently over 200 stores. It is based in Moscow and was founded in 1999.

== History ==
The founder of the coffee chain was the Russian entrepreneur Timur Khairutdinov. According to the information provided by the coffee house itself, the idea of creating a "Coffee House" was born in one of the famous coffee houses in Milan, and the first bartenders from Russia studied the art of brewing coffee in Italy from the leading barista Giuseppe Grasse. After the return of the already trained young people, the first coffee shop was opened in Moscow on September 29, 1999. Its location was the shopping center "Gallery Actor". By 2001, there were already 5 such establishments in Moscow.

By 2006, about 30 coffee shops were opened in St. Petersburg, after which the management decided to create its own production workshop for the production of confectionery (and not only) products. Over time, the Coffee House grew, and the number of its establishments numbered more than 200 in various cities of Russia and neighboring countries. The company has opened its coffee shops in Moscow, St. Petersburg, Novosibirsk, Yekaterinburg, Kazan and Kiev in Ukraine.

Due to financial problems, negotiations began in early 2014 on the sale of part of the coffee chain to the main competitor of the company "Shokoladnitsa", but by the end of summer 2014 it became known about the complete sale of the chain, including franchised coffee shops. The deal on the transfer of coffee houses to the Coffee House Chocolatier was completed on October 6, 2014.

== Criticism ==
In summer of 2013, Ukrainian branch of the chain was accused of anti-Ukrainian sentiment and a disdain for visitors.

In summer of 2014 activists of the "Do not buy Russian goods!" campaign conducted several flash mobs and protests in many of the network's coffee shops in Kyiv. Young people handed out ammo to visitors and then fell as dead, informing people about the shops' Russian origin and that part of Coffee House's profit flows into Russian economy.
