= Allan Jordan =

Mid-twentieth-century Australian painter, printmaker and teacher

Allan H. Jordan
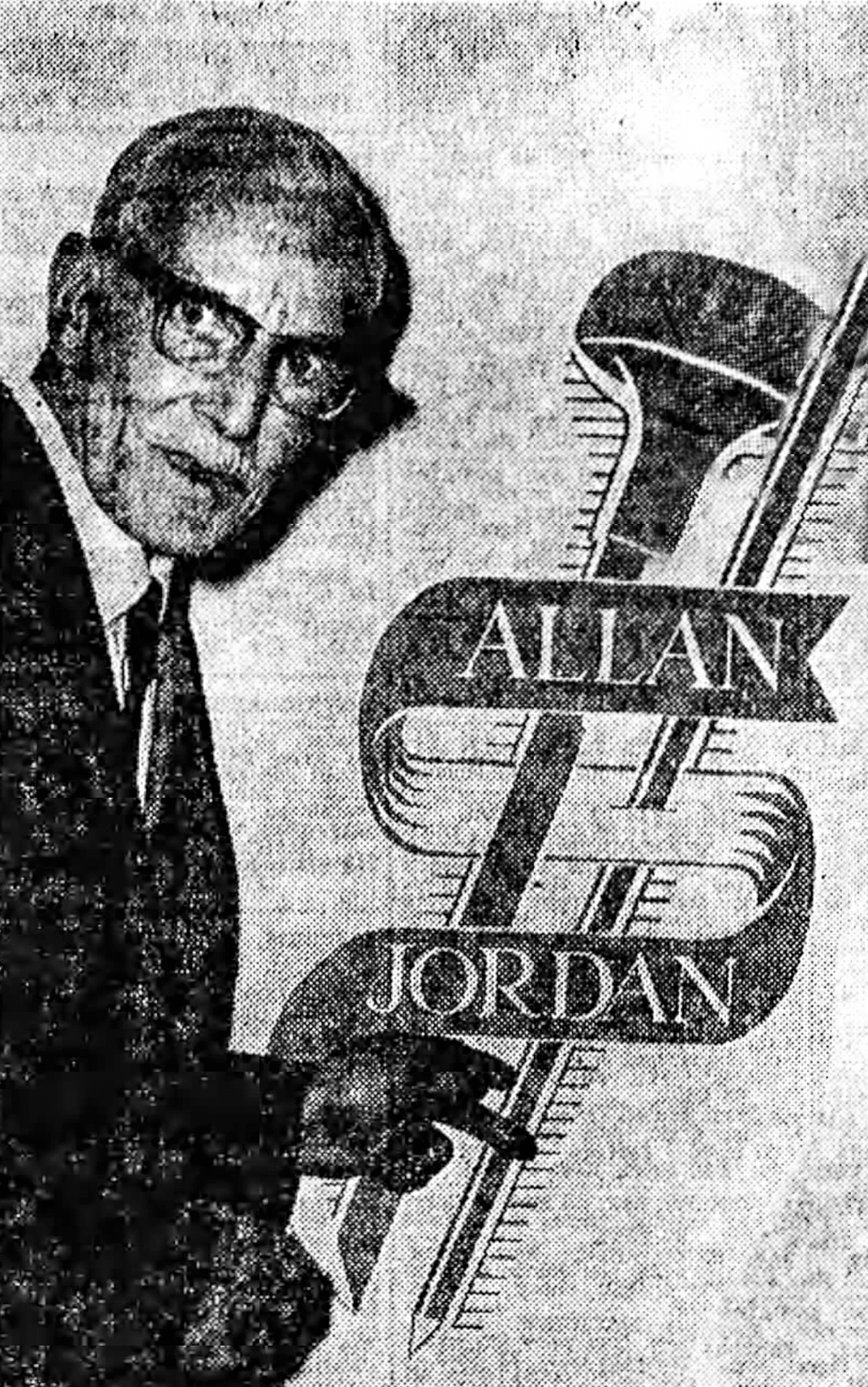
- Allan Jordan with artwork at Swinburne College
- Born: 1898; Elsternwick, Victoria
- Died: 1982 (aged 83–84); Prahran, Victoria
- Resting place: Springvale Cemetery
- Education: Swinburne Technical College
- Known for: Printmaking
- Style: Art Deco
- Spouses: Elsie Male (m. 1925; died 1948); Nellie May Hale (m. 1960.; died 1967)
- Children: Marie Elspeth (Wright)
- Parents: James Olver Jordan (father); Maud Ethel (née Alleyne) (mother)

Allan Holder Jordan (1898–1982) was an Australian painter, designer, printmaker and teacher.

== Early life ==
Allan Jordon was born in 1898 in Elsternwick, the son of Sandhurst-born customs agent James Oliver Jordan and Maud Ethel (née Alleyne) who married in 1897.

Living in Malvern, Jordan's interest at age sixteen was in amateur photography, on the subject of which he contributed three articles, with concise diagrams, to The Australasian Photo-Review, one in the 15 January 1916 edition about making "Photographic Bookplates," another on building a home darkroom in a bathroom, and one instructing how to use a camera as a solar enlarger. His photographs featured in the magazine, and he was also awarded prizes in the A P-R competitions.

== Career ==
Jordan studied at Swinburne Technical College from 1915 to 1919.

=== Printmaker ===
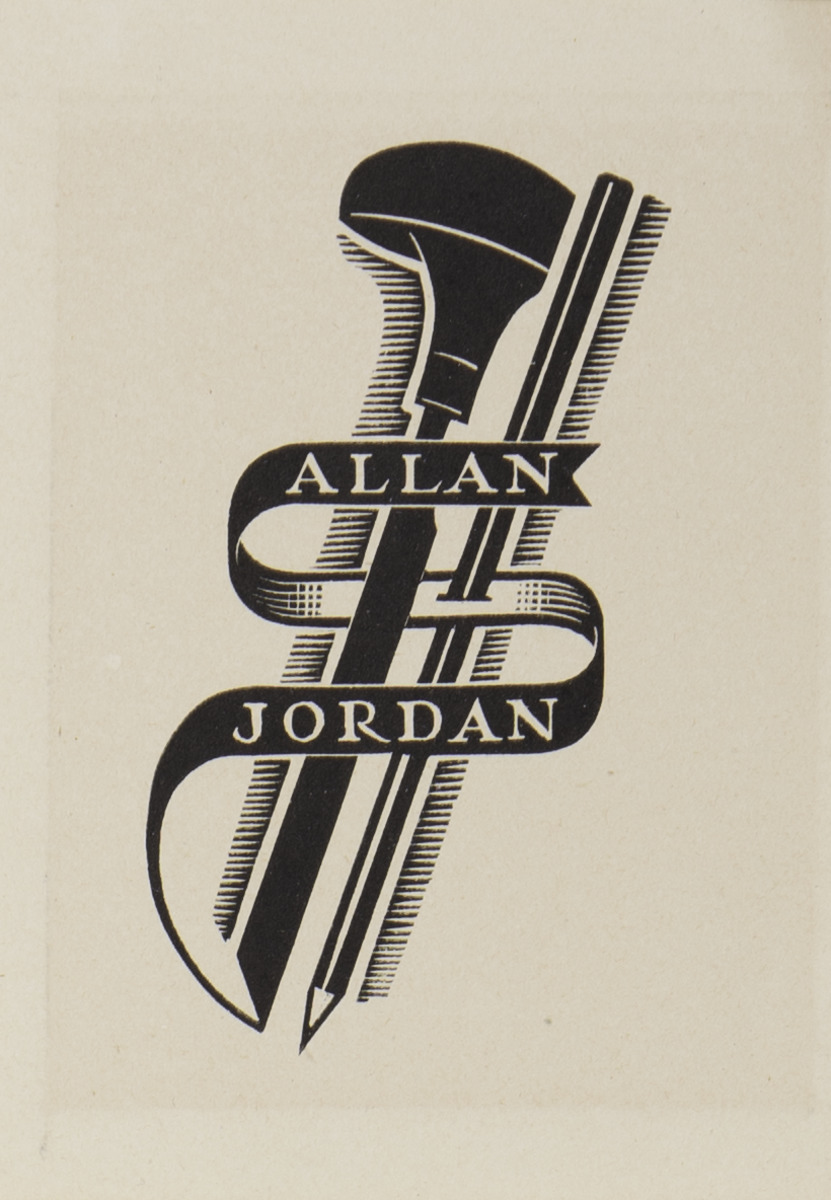
Allan Jordan (1930s) Allan Jordan 5.2 x 6.8cm woodcut, Hamilton Gallery Collection

He worked mainly in woodcuts and wood engraving and was an influential teacher in printmaking and book arts in Australia. His oeuvre numbers sixty graphic prints, twenty designed and illustrated small books and seventy-one bookplates, as well as drawings, paintings, pastels and small mosaics, a body of work noted by Robert Littlewood "for its consistent quality of design and draftsmanship combined with the expert manner in which the works have been created."

Littlewood identifies "three notable areas of interest in Jordan's creative effort: linocuts and colour woodcuts in the 1930s; book design and illustration in the 1940s; and bookplate design for two decades from 1939 until 1958." Jordan exhibited in group shows through the 1930s, and less frequently in subsequent years.

=== Coin design ===
After complaints to the Federal Treasurer that some of Australia's coin designs were heraldically incorrect, action was taken in September 1946, when Prime Minister Chifley, while at Renmmark, was presented with a suggested lyrebird design by Jordan to replace the coat of arms displayed on the sixpence that was claimed to be obsolete. Chifley promised to consider the Jordan's design made in collaboration with Sydney V. Hagley of the Numismatic Society. Ultimately the design of the coin was unchanged.

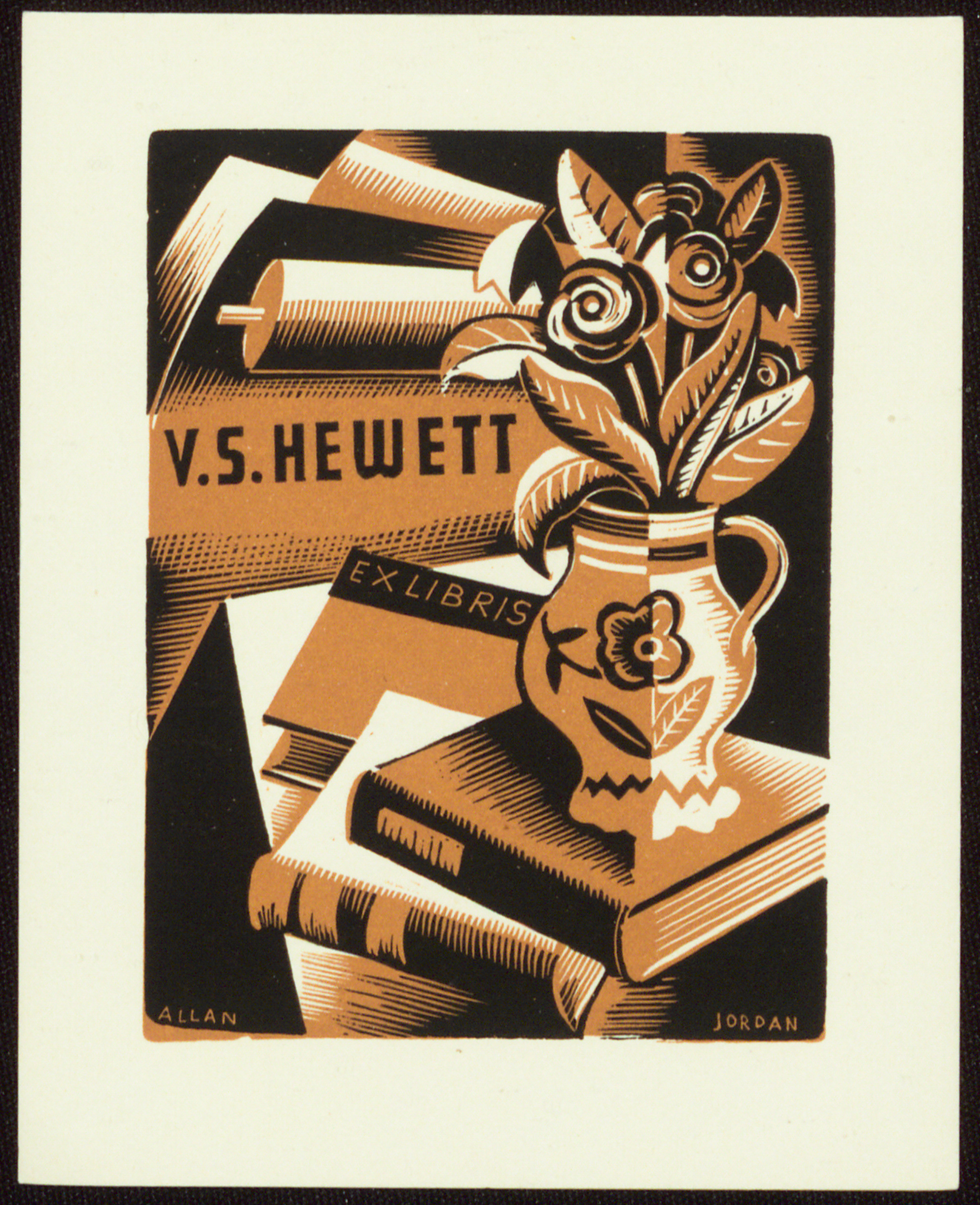
Allan Jordan bookplate for printer V S Hewett, production manager at Specialty Press, Melbourne, and member, Australian Ex Libris Society

=== Illustrator ===
Amongst his work are five wood engravings for Joseph O'Dwyer's The Turning Year 1944. Other designs he created for Hawthorn Press, Melbourne in the 1940s included a series of paperback booklets printed on lesser-quality wartime paper and sold at 1 shilling and sixpence, which were written by Frank Clune, each dealing with some aspect of Australian history, such as his 1944 Stories of Central Australia.

=== Bookplates ===
Jordan joined artists Neville Barnett, Roy Davies, Adrian Feint, Lionel Lindsay and Philip Litchfield in a revival of the bookplate before World War Two. His Ex Libris bookplates often employ intricate rebuses to characterise their owners, and such is the case with that he created for World War Two hero Russell Francis Wright MBE (1920–2012).

Jordan's prints and paintings are in national and international collections.

== Reception ==
Jordan's work in a 1931 group show was praised in The Age as "the most unique of the four contributors,"for his fifteen color and black prints from wood blocks" and picked out for "an outstanding print in black, Treasure Ship, admirably drawn and full of movement." The Bulletin reviewing the same show reports that "Allan Jordan has been trying to capture some of the subtlety of Melbourne's winter atmosphere per the very difficult medium of the woodblock, and in The Changing Skyline, Exhibition Building and Winter Sunshine, Fitzroy Garden, has succeeded in nabbing some of the bolder contrasts." Artist and critic Harold Herbert also prasied his work in that show, writing that "Mr. Jordan is an accomplished designer and an efficient craftsman."

Of a joint exhibition he held in Melbourne in 1932 with Dorothy Lungley, the Age reviewed his linocuts, etchings and drypoints, describing the colour prints as "uniformly good in execution and conception, and from the purely decorative point of view, are in advance of most of the things we have seen lately produced by this process," but noted that while "the etchings are artistic in execution," they "might have been cleaner in line in some cases."

== Teaching ==
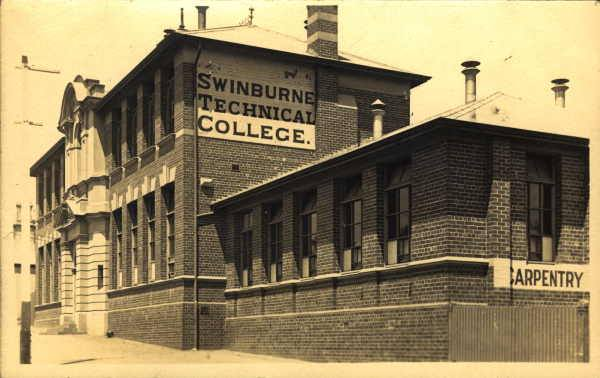
Swinburne Technical College, 1940

Jordan, after being a student, then influential teacher there, was Head of the Swinburne Art School from 1957, retiring in 1959. While senior art lecturer at Swinburne, Jordan wrote an article on "Linocuts" for the November 1934 issue of Manuscripts, which he illustrated with linocuts 'designed, cut and printed by students...'

During his tenure the school grew from three small studios in which art studies, mostly craftwork, painting and wood carving, were taught by the then Director, Mr. Prior, himself a modeller. Enrolment grew to over 100 full day diploma students and a total of 300 with part time students at the time of Jordan's retirement.

== Personal life ==
Jordan lived in Deepene in the 1950s, at Caversham Court, 763 Esplanade Mornington, and in retirement with wife Nellie at Red Hill Road, Red Hill, then at 23 Monaro Road Kooyong. He first married Elsie (née Male) in 1923, who predeceased him on 21 March 1948. He then married Nellie May (née Hale, born 1903) whose death was 29 Apr 1967, well before his own on 17 May 1982 at the Alfred Hospital. He was cremated at Springvale Cemetery, survived by his only child, a daughter from his marriage with Elsie; trained nurse Marie Elspeth Wright who had been educated at Fintona Girls' School.

P. Neville Barnett remembered Jordan as "a genial character in a quiet, ingrained, good-natured way."

== Exhibitions ==
- 1931, 3 November - 17 December: Group show with John Shirlow, Esther Paterson and Charles Nuttall. Fine Art Society Galleries, Melbourne
- 1932, from 29 November: Joint show with Dorothy Lungley at Everyman'a Library, 332 Collins Street
- 1933, from 3 October: Annual Show of the Victorian Artists' Society, with H. B. Harrison, John Munro, Dorothy Whitehead, Reginald Hicks, A. Montgomery, Charles Lloyd, Alexander Coffey, Ernest Buckmaster, E.R. Jones, H. K. Leask, Herbert Rose, Violet Teague, Dora Serle, Dora Wilson, Norah Gurdon, Aileen Dent, Victor Zelman, Gretchen Leachkau, Theo B. Hansen, S. Grainger, P. Mallon, Ada Whiting, S. Ralph, Hans Heyson, J. G. Felt, A. T. Bernaldo, James McMahon, C. Hills, R. Malcolm Warner, John Rowell, G. F. Turner, Allan Jordan, Murray Griffin, Paul Montford, Wallace Anderson, J. Russell Jackson, Marguerite C. Mahout, at the Society rooms, Albert Street, East Melbourne.
- 1933, from 16 October; Annual exhibition of the Arts and Crafts Society of Victoria, with Bresslern-Roth, Carl Rotky, Thea Proctor, Miss Alsop, E. W. Syme, Dorrit Black, Allan Jordan, opened by the Lieutenant-Governor Sir William Irvine. Lower Melbourne Town Hall.
- 1934, to 29 September: group show with sixteen other exhibitors, including John Shirlow, Victor Cobb, Oscar Binder, J. C. Goodhart, Sydney Ure Smith, Jessie C. Traill, Harold Herbert, John C. Goodchild, Cyril Dillon and Charles Nuttall. Newman's Gallery, 289 Collins Street, Melbourne
- 1935, from 16 October: Arts and Crafts Society group exhibition, with Murray Griffin, Helen Ogilvie, Margaret Preston, Ethleen Mary Palmer, Adelaide Perry, Sybil Andrews, Jessie Digby, Jocelyn Crowe, Rex Wood, Norma Bull, Allan Jordan, Dorothy Kealing, Anne Montgomerie, and Mary Cecil Allen
- 1936, from 28 September: Victorian Artists' Society Spring Exhibition, with Hans Heysen, Vida Lahey, John Eldershaw, Kenneth Macqueen, Albert Tucker, Len Annois, Thomas Henry Bone, John Loxton, Edward Heffernan, F. R. Carter, Sybil Craig: J. Seton, Dora Wilson, Murray Griffin, Ethleen Palmer
- 1938, 13–22 October; Annual Arts and Crafts Show, Lower Town Hall, Melbourne
- 1943, from 1 December; Inclusion in a group show of ninety-one paintings and etchings with Arnold Shore, Max Meldrum, John Rowell, Jas. Quinn, John Farmer, Mary Hurry, Dora Serle, Margaret Pestell, Dora Wilson, Isabel Tweddle, Aileen Dent, Murray Griffin, Geo. Colville, and Victor Cog. Hawthorn Library.
- 1946, to 11 July; The Bread and Cheese Club group show, including works by George Browning, Allan Jordan and William Hunter, Myer Art Gallery
- 1947, from 23 November; The Bread and Cheese Club's Art Group spring exhibition 272 Post Office-place, Melbourne.
- 1974, 29 November-11 December: Exhibition of etchings and prints by Norman Lindsay, Kenry Van Raalte, Sydney Ure Smith, John Shirlow, Lionel Lindsay, Victor Cobb, Ernest E. Abbott, Len annois, G. Arnsdell, Victor Watt, George Cope, Molly O'Shea, G. Marler, Herbert Morre, Allan Jordan, Amelia Coats, N. Coventry, Victor Zelman, J. Goodhart, Nutta Buzzart, R. Stockfield, Ben Crosskell, Cyril Dillon, Evelyn Syme, John Borrack, Murray Walker, Herthe Kluge-Pott, Leonard French, Noel Counihan, and Fred Williams at Duvance Galleries.
- 2015, 13 June – 16 August: Jordan woodcuts featured in Australia's Robinson Crusoe: The Fabulous Tale of Louis de Rougemont, Art Gallery of Ballarat,

== Illustrated books and illustrations in books ==
- Julius John Lankes (1932), A woodcut manual, New York H. Holt and Company
- O'Dwyer, Joseph (1944). The turning year. Melbourne: Hawthorn Press. OCLC 11066314.
- Clune, Frank (1944). The red heart: sagas of Centralia. Melbourne: The Hawthorn Press. OCLC 906327807.
- Turnbull, Clive (1946). Eureka: the story of Peter Lalor. Melbourne: Hawthorn Press. OCLC 37097809.
- Croll, Robert Henderson; Jordan, Allan, 1898-1982, (artist.); Hawthorn Press (1947), Umph the gargoyle, Hawthorn Press
- Gartner, John; Jordan, Allan; Hawthorn Press (1948), A noose for Ned...: reprint of a very rare pamphlet; with a foreword by Frank Clune, Hawthorn Press
- Platt, John (1948), Colour woodcuts: a book of reproductions and a handbook of method, Pitman & Sons
- Chisholm, Alec H. (Alec Hugh); Rowan, Ellis, 1848-1922; Jordan, Allan (1949), News from nature: a selection of seasonal gossip, Georgian House
- Henderson, Alexander (1953), A century in timber, J. Wright & Sons Pty. Ltd
- Littlewood, Robert C. (Robert Clive); Jordan, Allan, 1898-1982, (artist.); Lytlewode Press, (publisher.) (2014), Ten bookplates by Allan Jordan, Lytlewode Press, ISBN 978-1-905611-60-7

== Collections ==
- The Graham Bookplate Collection; bookplates collected by David H Graham
- National Gallery of Australia
- National Gallery of Victoria
- Hamilton Art Gallery
- Benalla Art Gallery
- Swinburne University Art Collection
- Rijksmuseum

== Gallery of bookplates by Allan Jordan ==
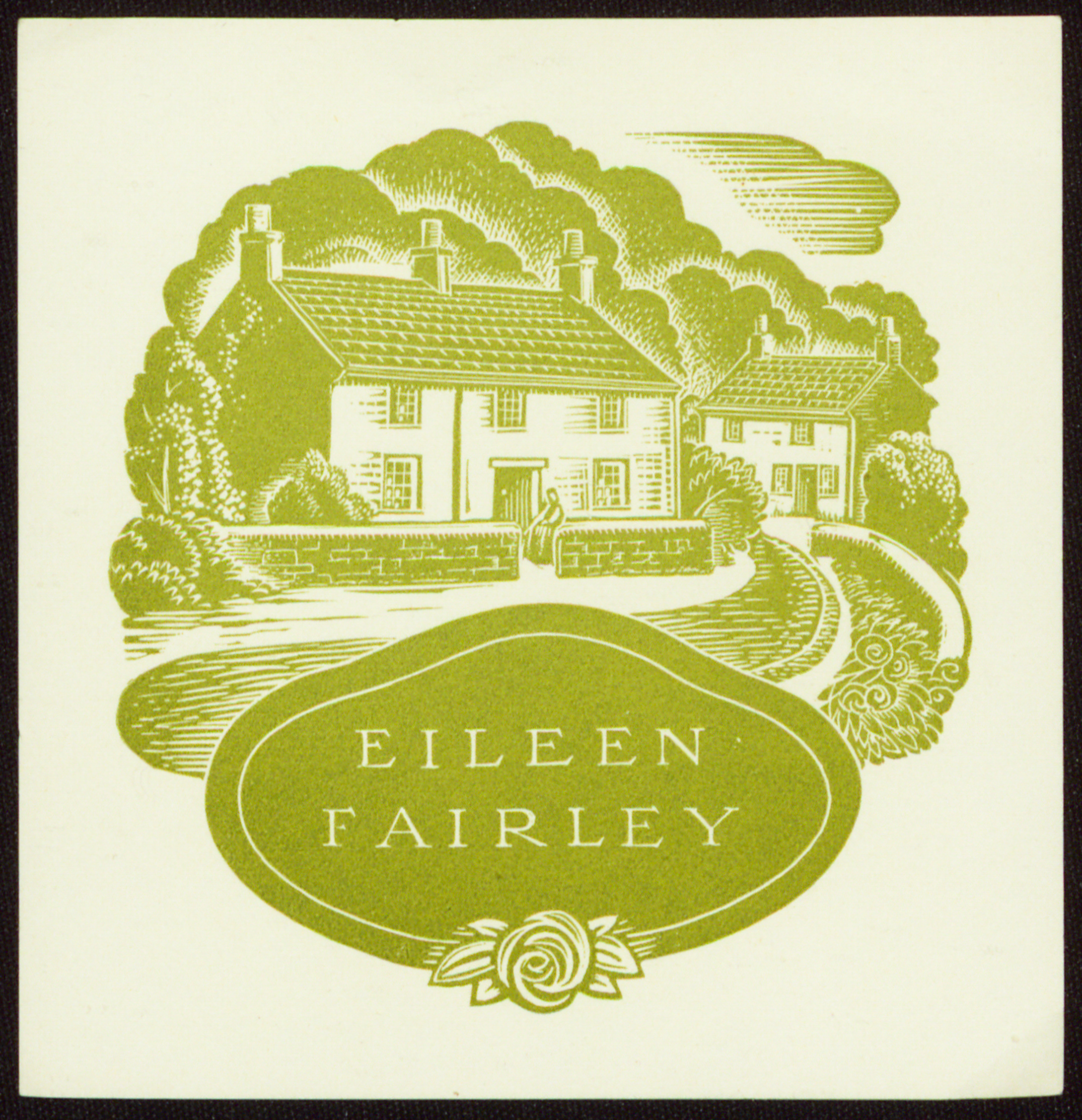

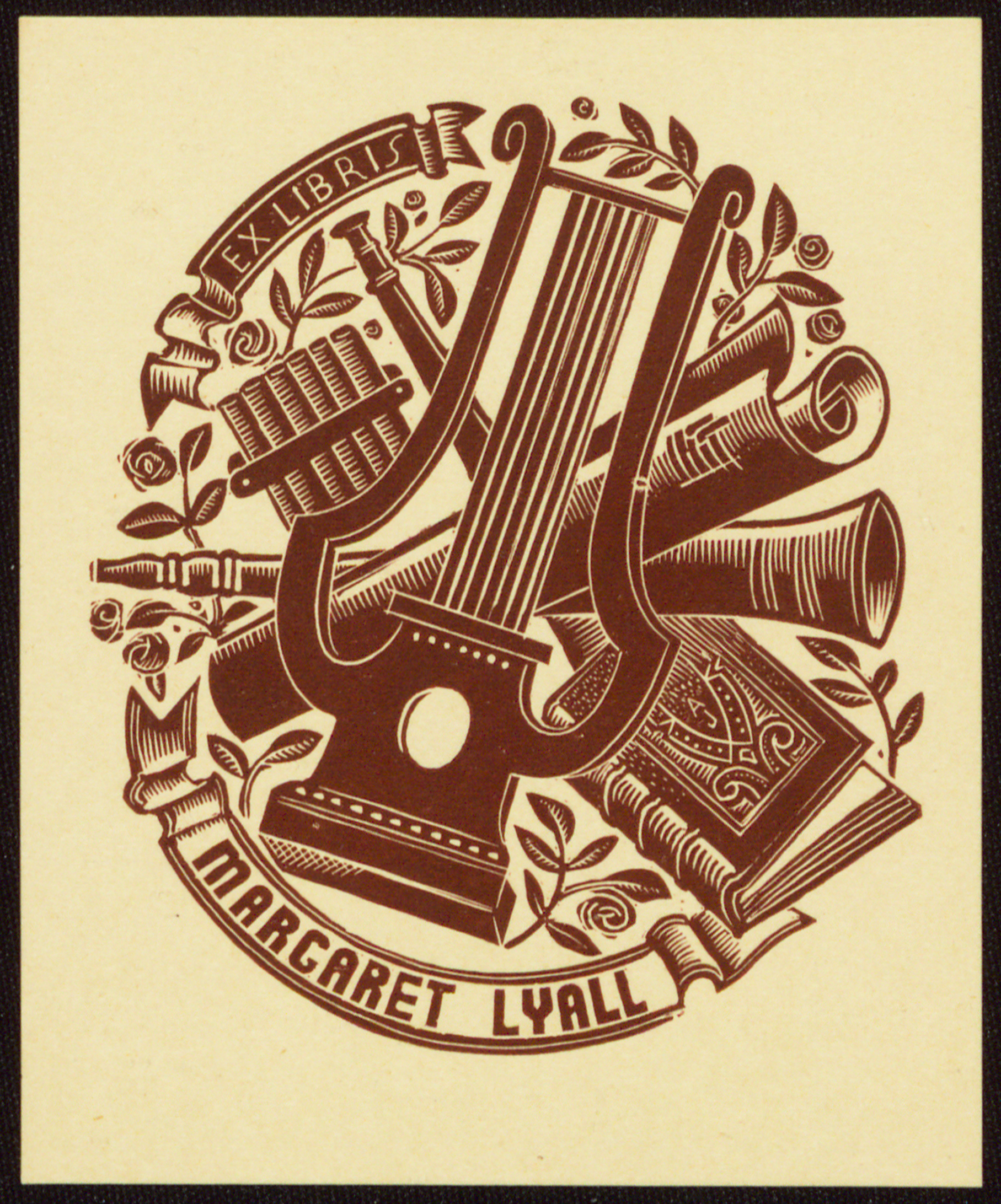

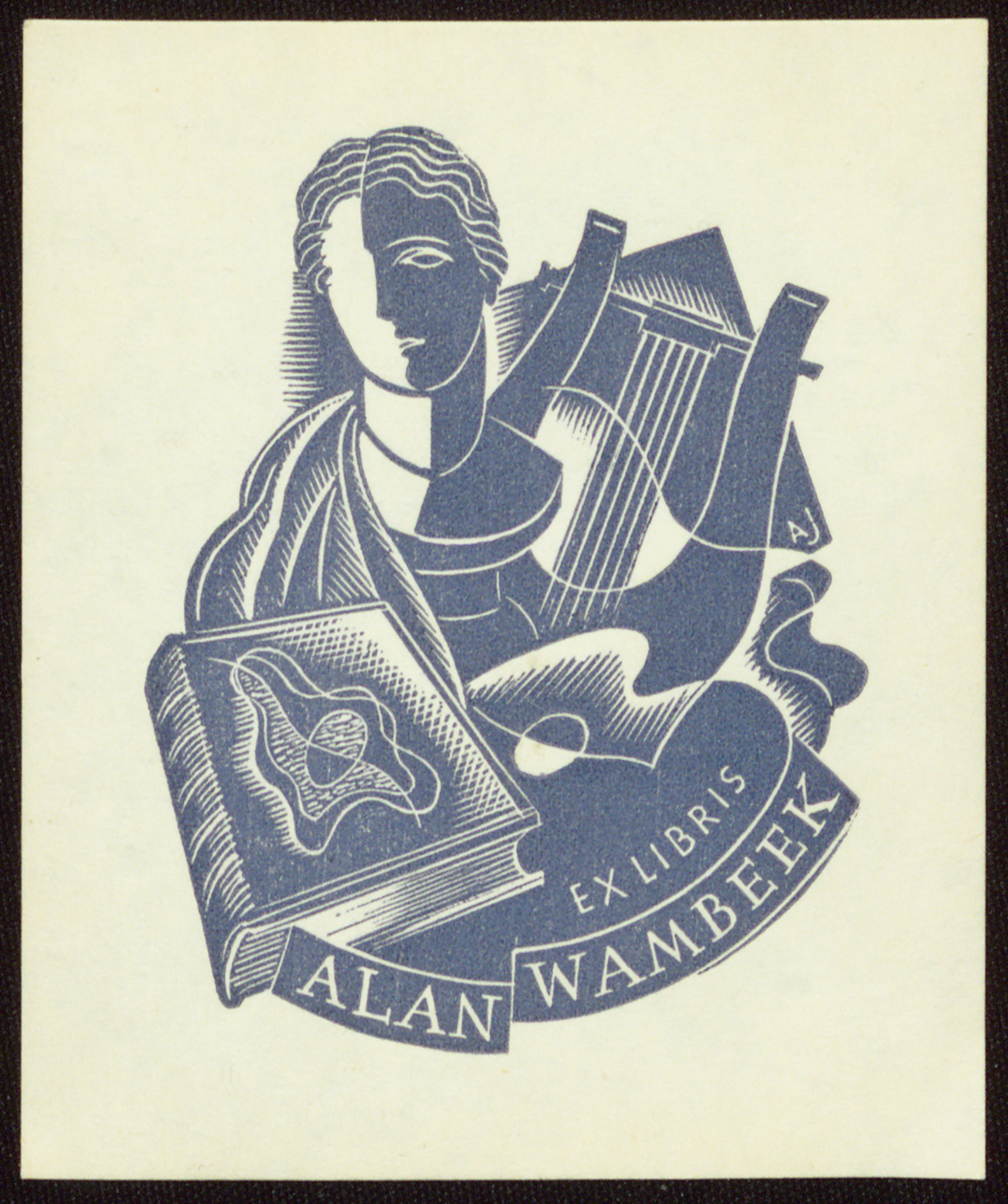

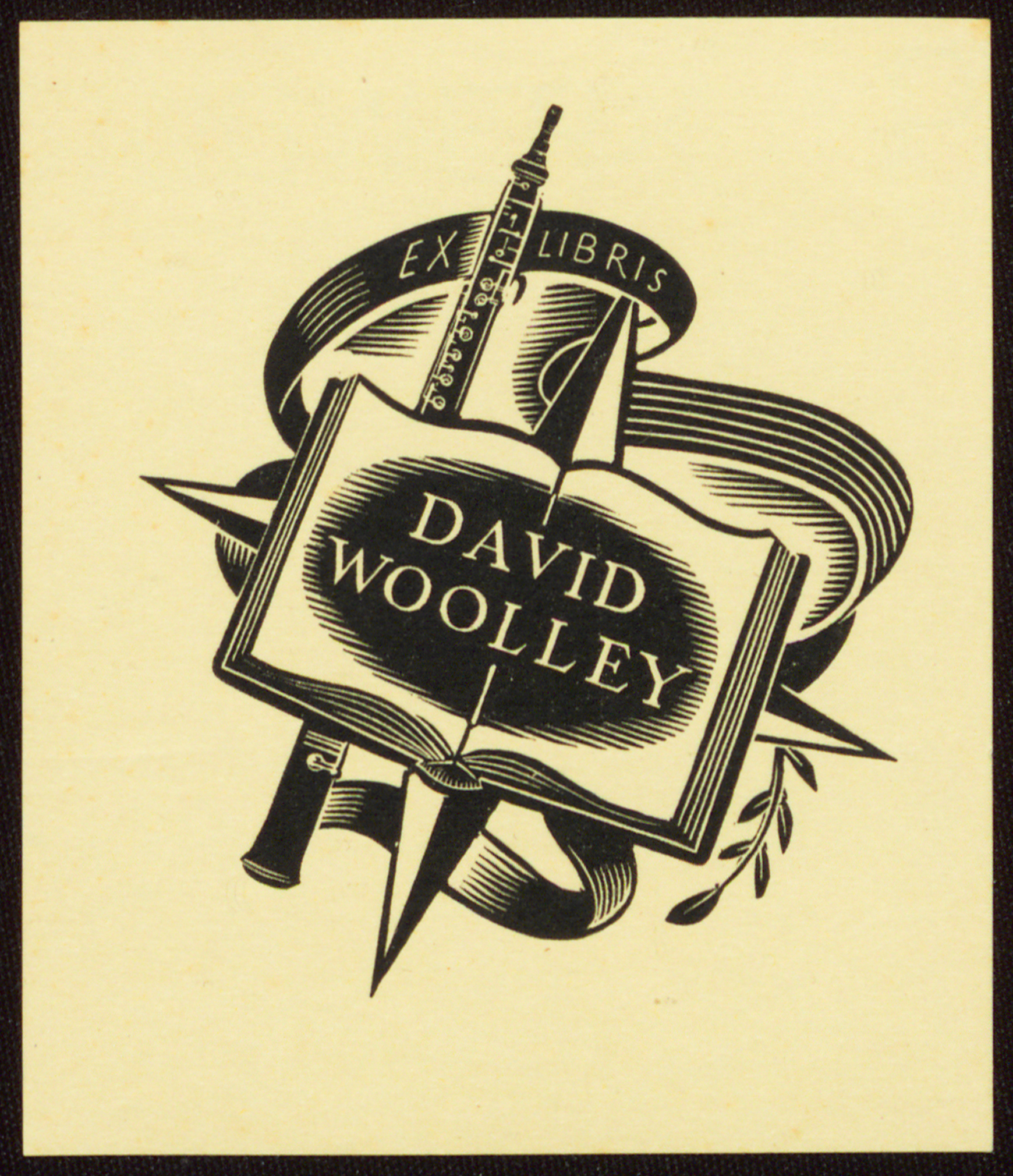

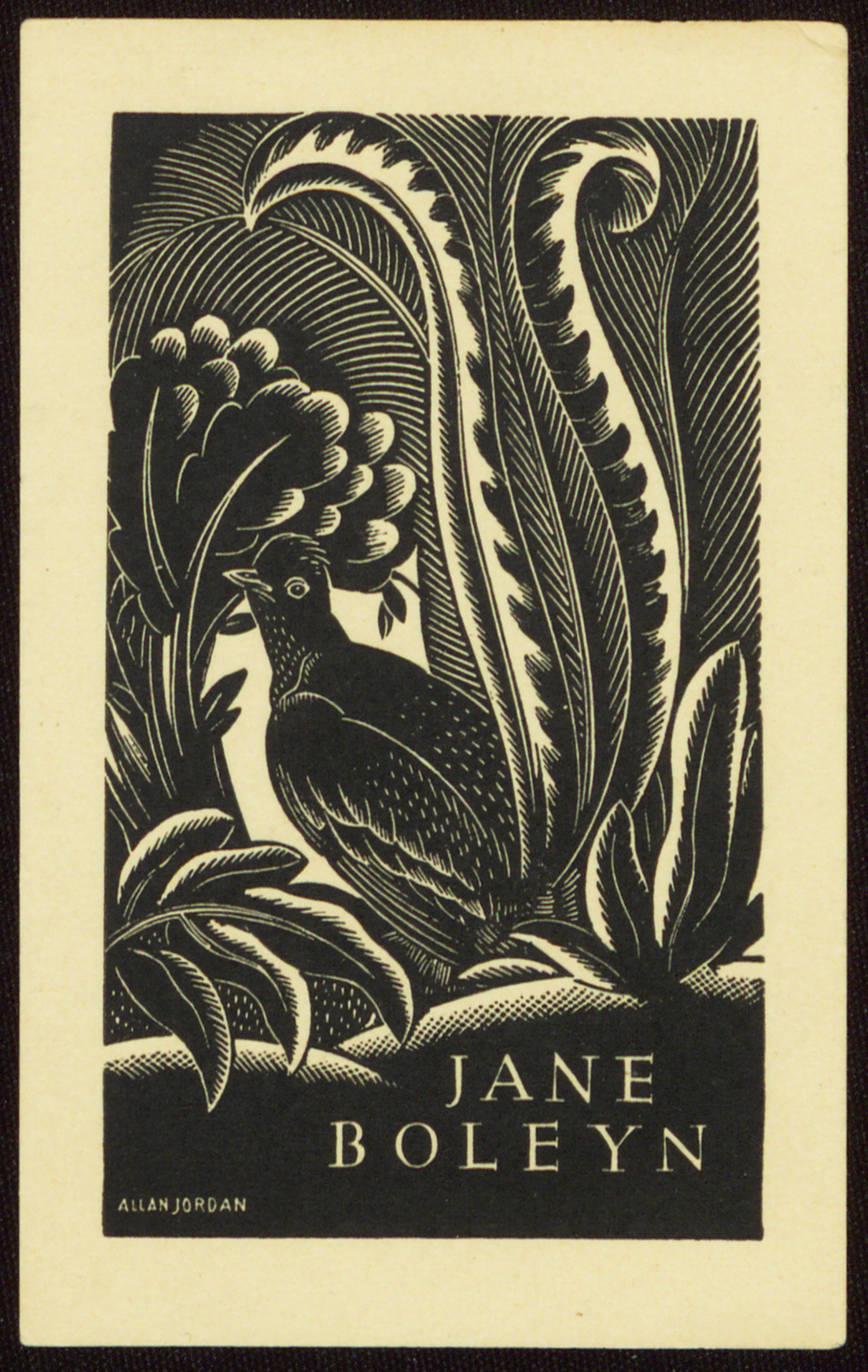

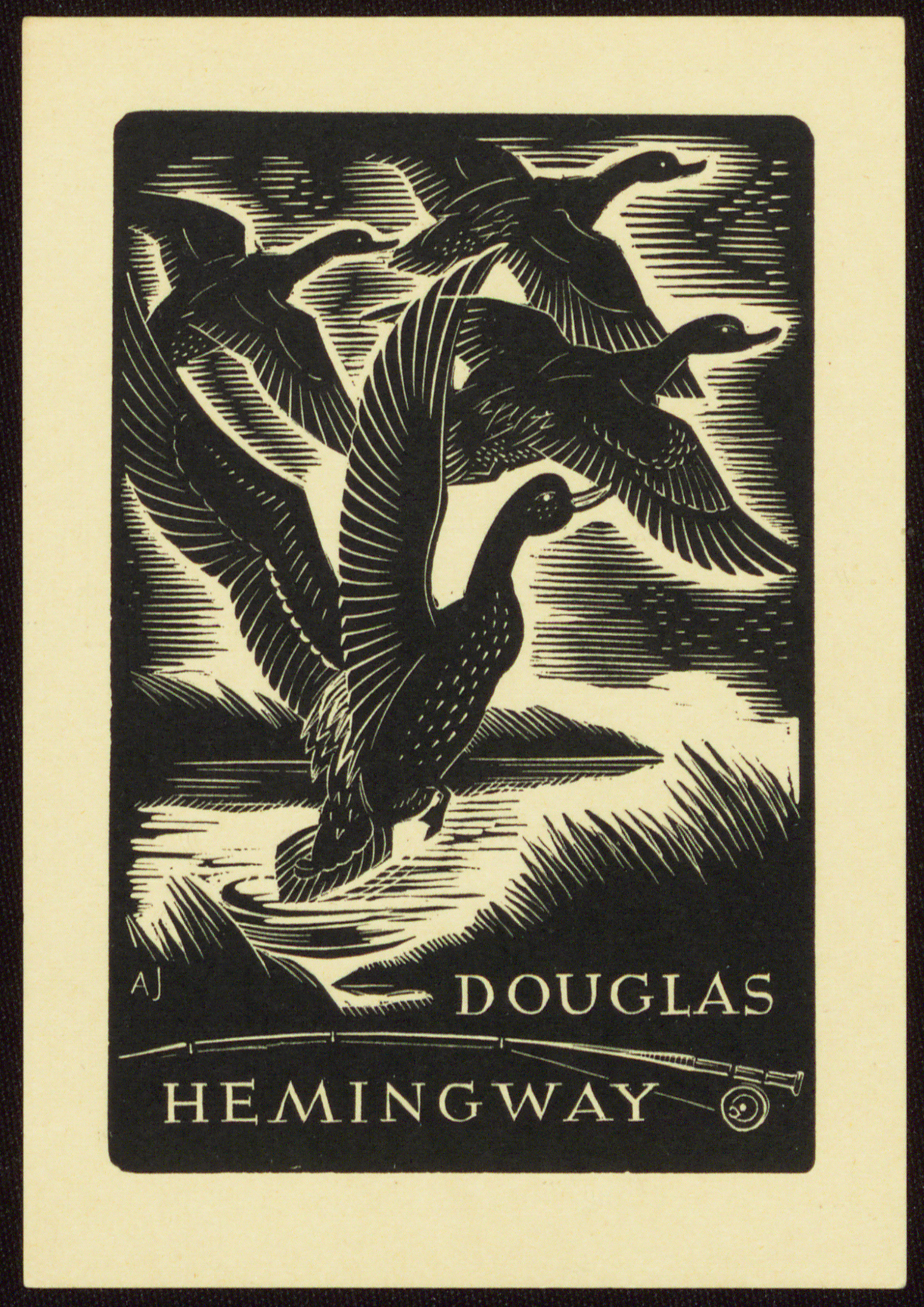

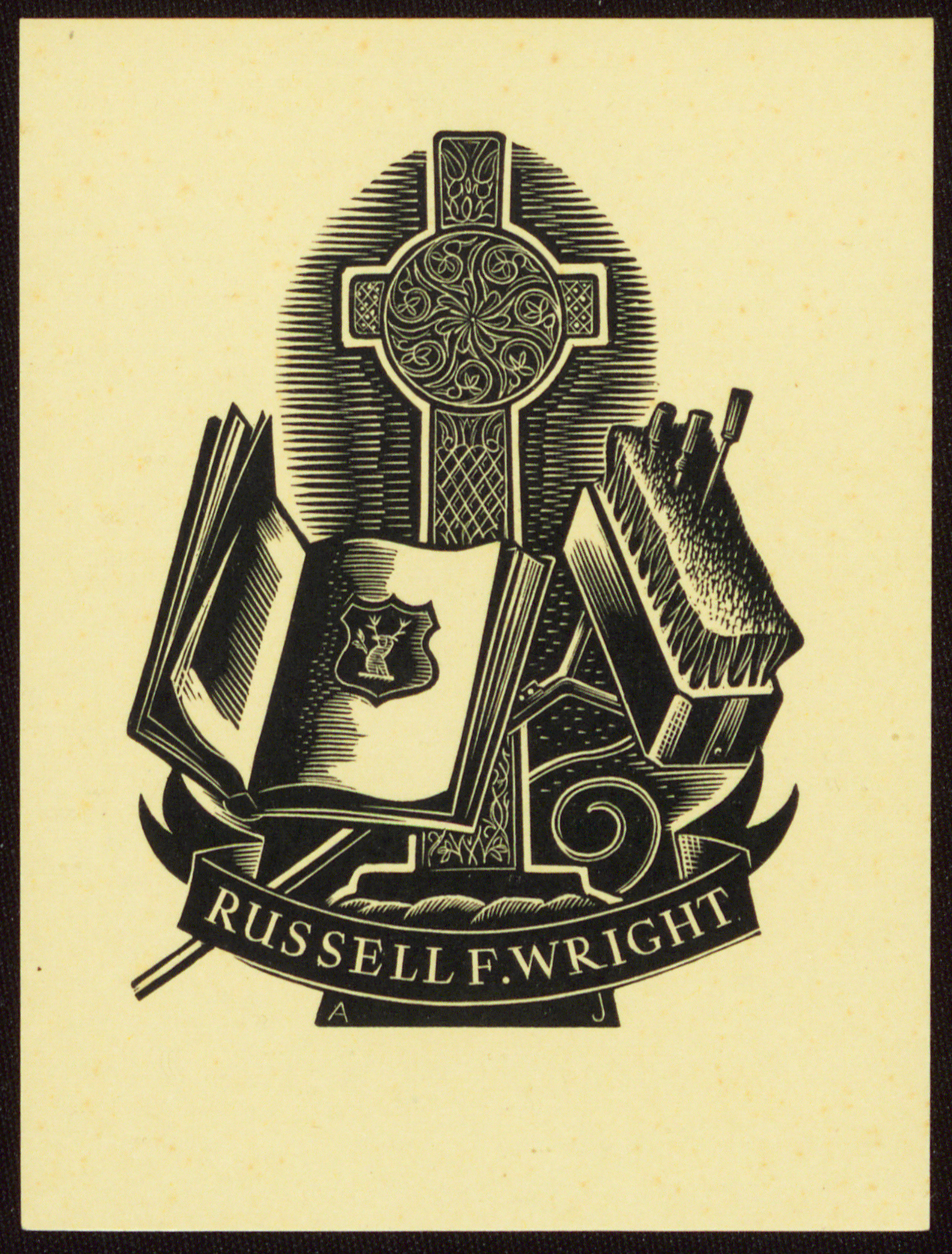

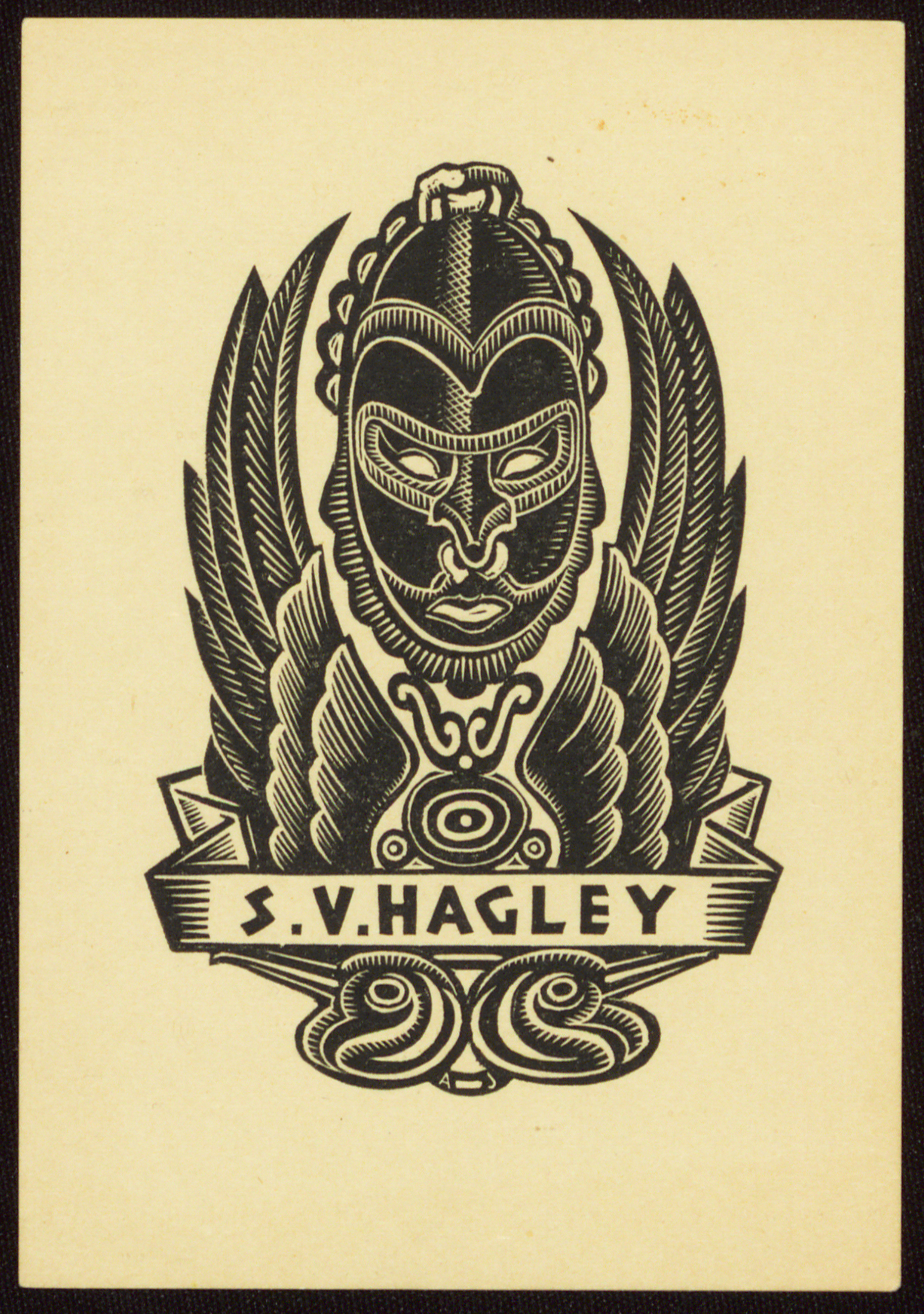

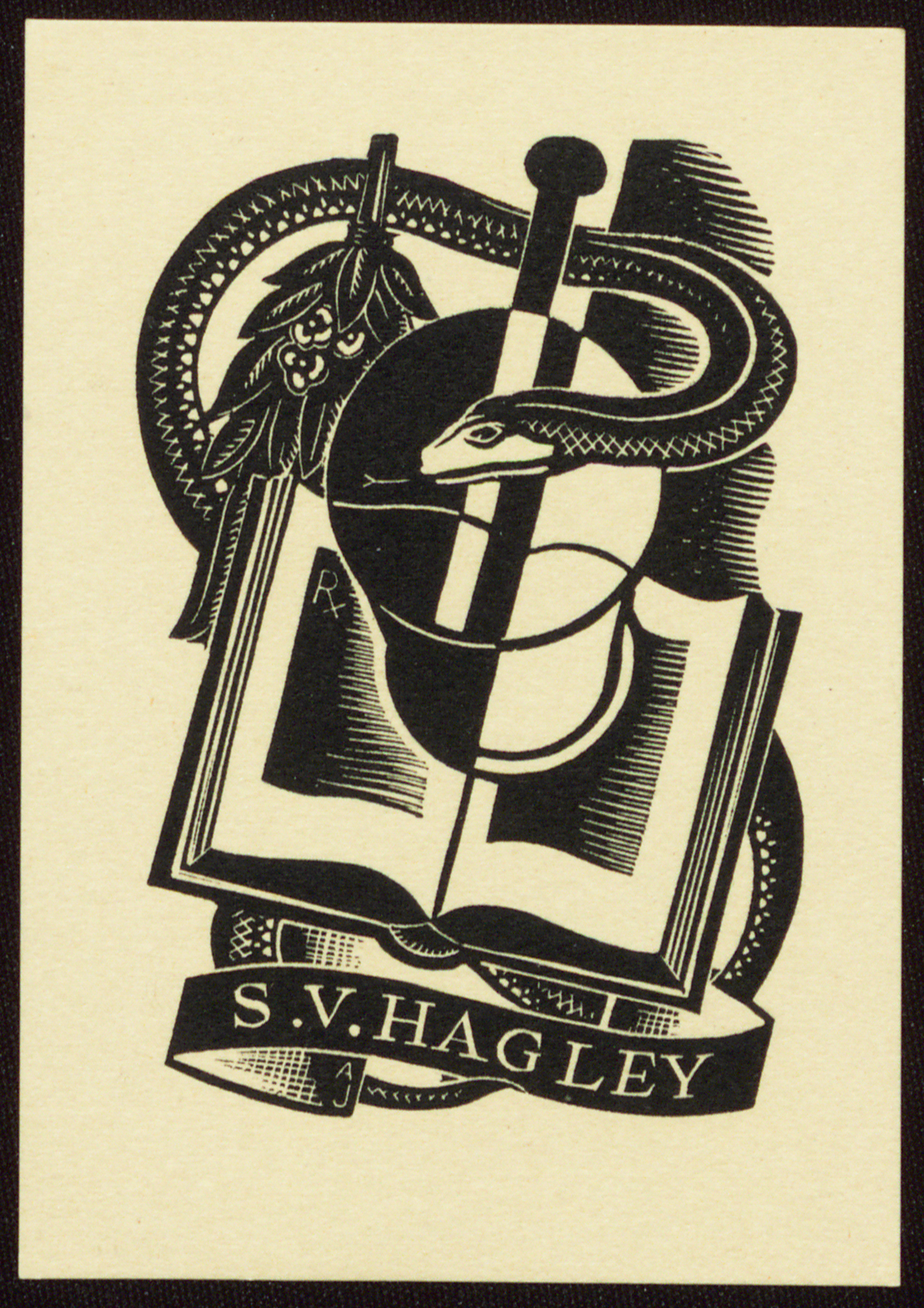

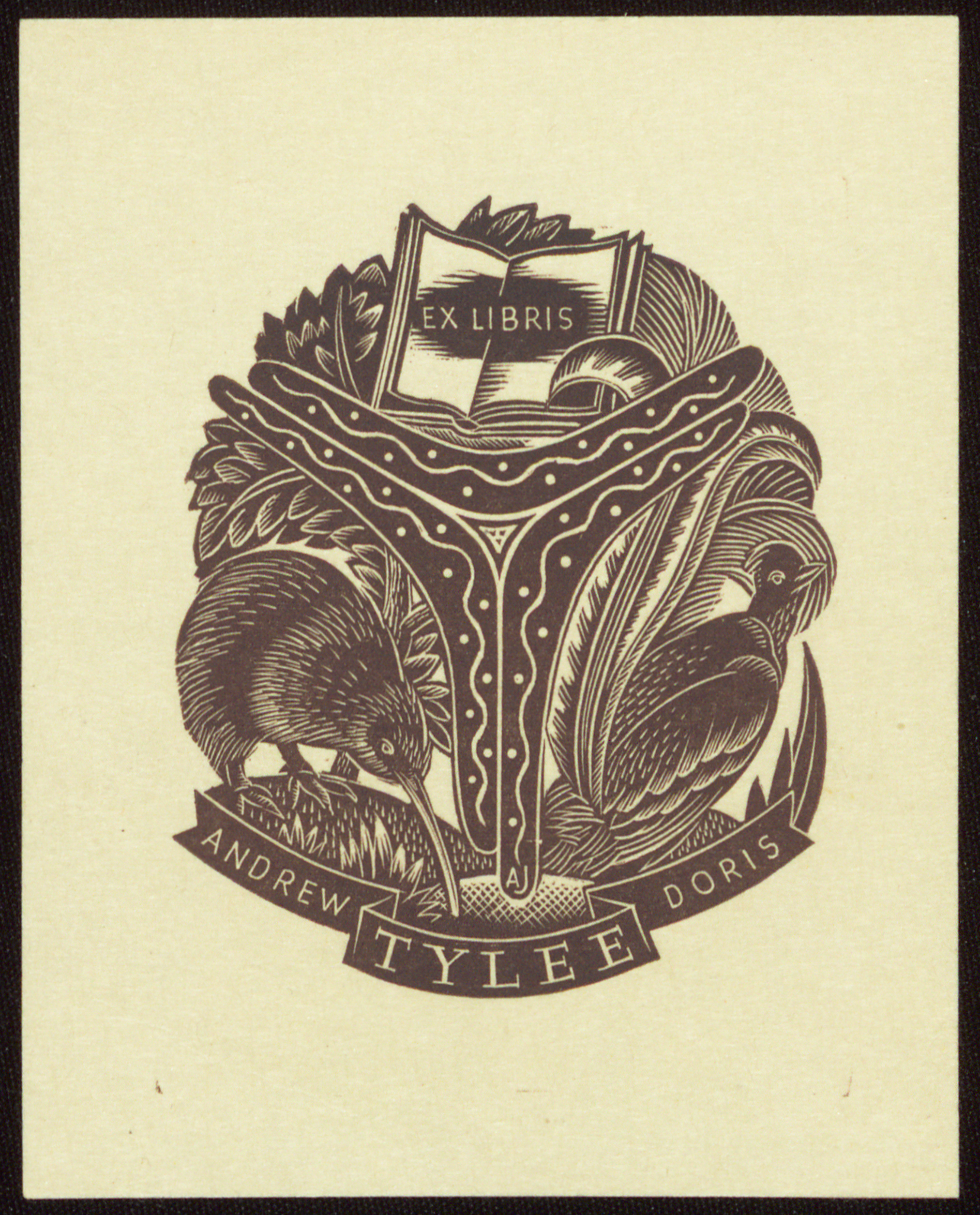

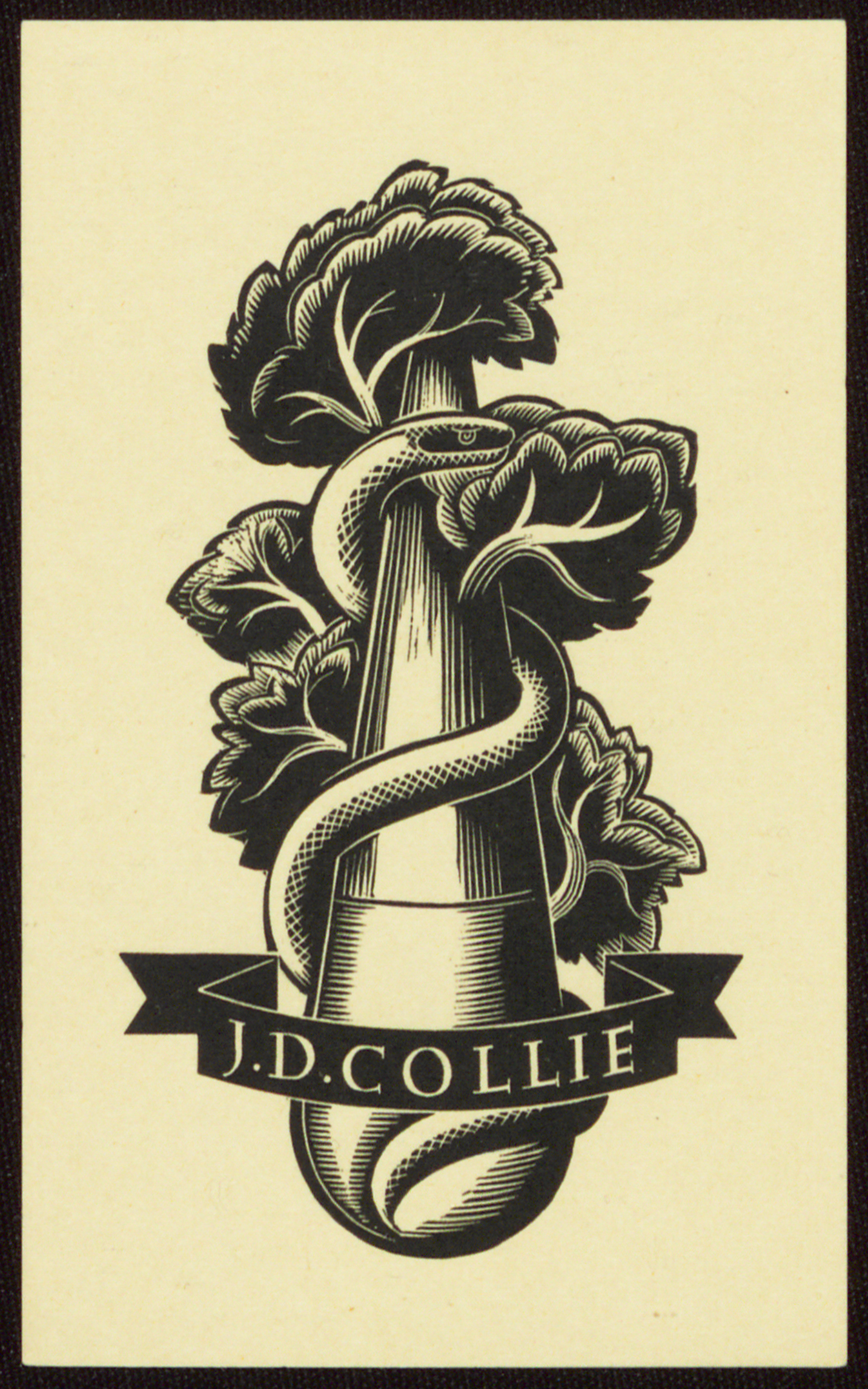

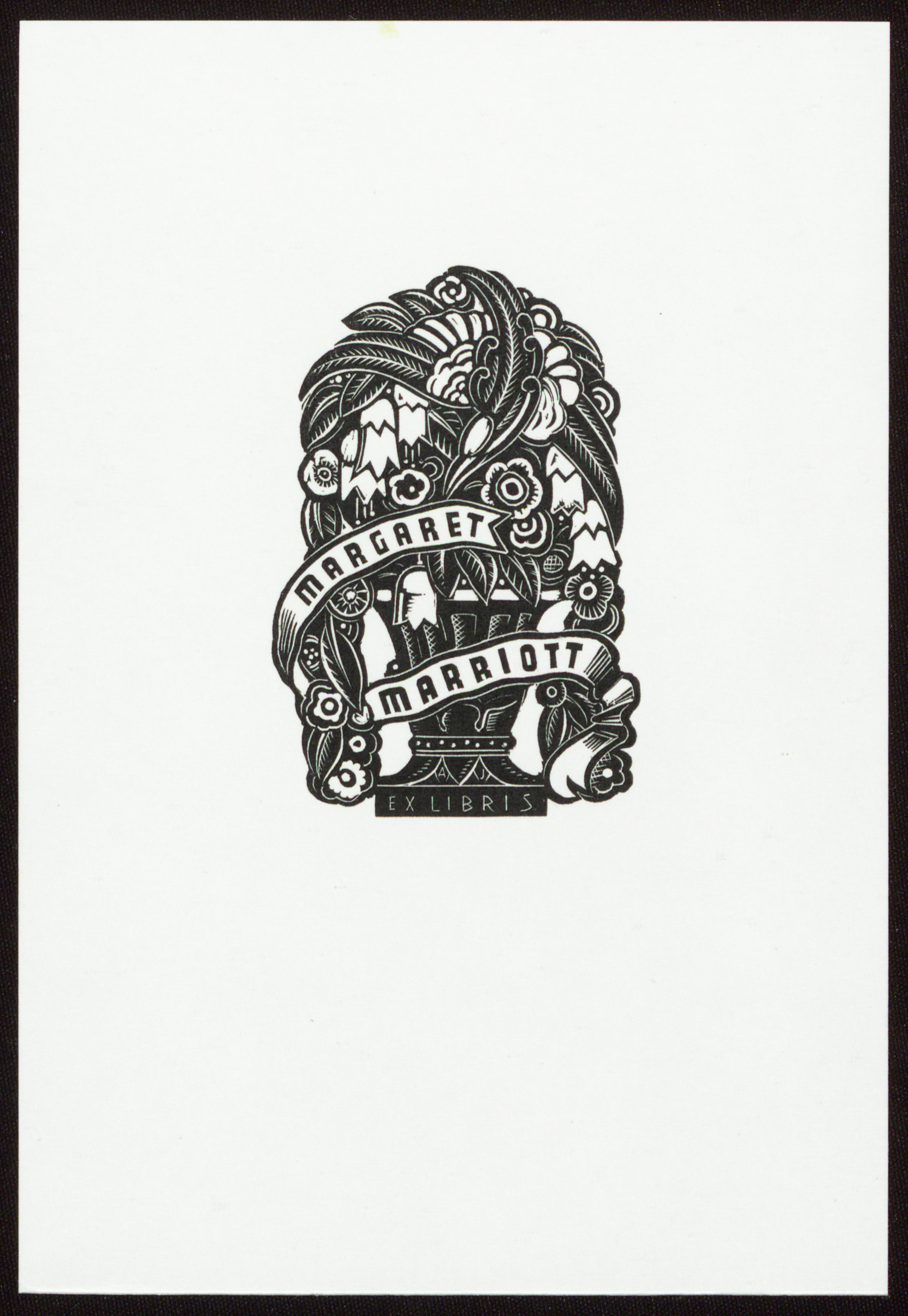

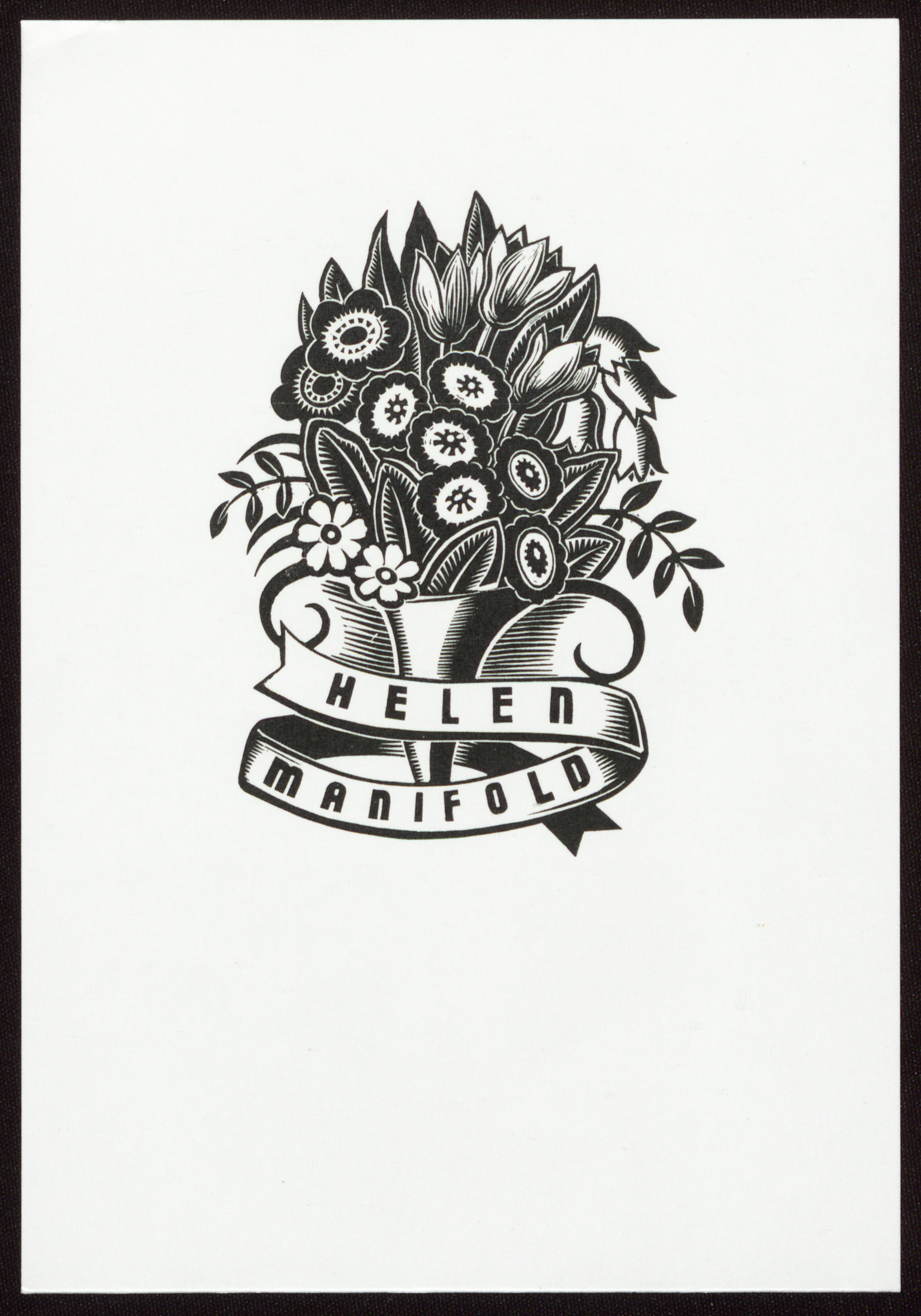

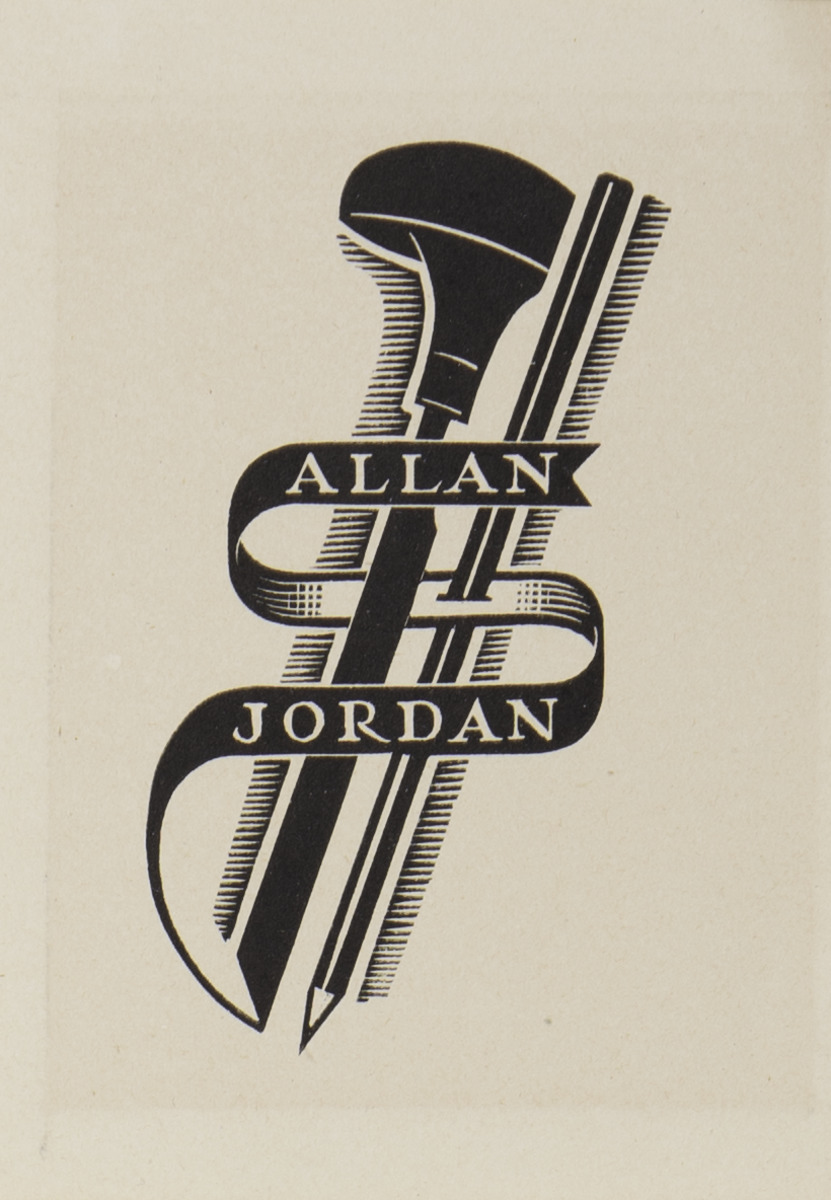
