= Harold Herbert (artist) =

Australian painter (1891–1945)

Harold Brocklebank Herbert
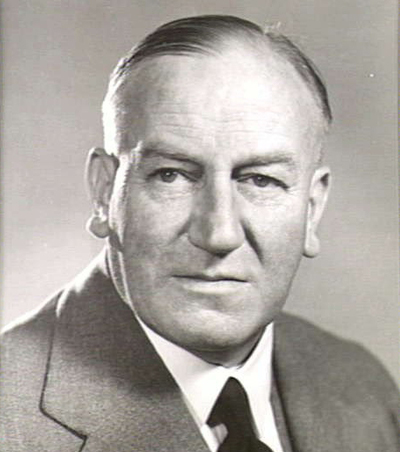
- Portrait of Harold Herbert by Unknown Australian Official Photographer, courtesy Australian War Memorial
- Born: 16 September 1891
- Died: 11 February 1945 (aged 53)
- Education: Ballarat Fine Art Gallery, Ballarat School of Mines
- Known for: Painting, Printmaking, Illustration, Cartooning
- Movement: Australian Impressionism

Harold Brocklebank Herbert (1891–1945) was an early 20th century Australian painter and printmaker, an illustrator and cartoonist. A traditionalist, as an art teacher he promoted representational painting, and amongst Australian newspaper art critics was an influential detractor of modernism. He was the first war artist to be appointed for Australia in the Second World War, serving for 6 months with the Australian Infantry Forces in Egypt in 1941 and in the Middle East in 1942.

== Early life and education ==
Born 16 September 1891 at Ballarat, Victoria, Harold Herbert was the son of locally-born George Herbert, organist and music teacher, and Jane Brocklebank, née Coward, from Lancashire, England. He undertook architecture and applied design at the Technical School of Design attached to the Ballarat Fine Art Gallery, then transferred to the Ballarat School of Mines in about 1907. Art inspector with the Victorian Education Department Ponsonby Carew-Smyth, recognising his talent, took him on as his assistant in Melbourne in 1912.

== Teaching ==
From 1915-19 Herbert was an art teacher for the Victorian Education Deptartment and at the Ballarat School of Mines.

== Career ==
Herbert continued the Australian impressionist style and exercised particular skill with watercolour washes and his etchings, lithographs and cartoons are in an economical, sketchy style. He painted with his left hand. Of his en-plein-air imagery The Herald noted that "Harold Herbert has made peculiarly his the sharp, bright light which characterises our summer landscape, and his warm colour has a host of admirers." However, more recent assessments of his art is that it “is now considered the epitome of ennui.”

During 1915-19 he traveled to paint in Europe, and in Morocco in 1922. Returning to Australia he arrived to acclaim. Works were purchased for the nascent National Gallery from his sell-out exhibition at Farmers Exhibition Hall, Sydney in May 1924, their third purchase from the artist since his return from overseas.

The Australian Watercolour Institute established in Sydney 21 August 1923 by six mostly British-born artists eminent in their era; Benjamin Edwin Minns, Martin Stainforth, Joseph Arthur Bennett, Charles Ephraim Smith Tindall, Alfred James Daplyn and Albert Henry Fullwood following the model of the British Royal Watercolour Society, founded in 1804, and the Royal Institute of Painters in Water Colours, founded in 1831. They adopted the name ‘Australian Watercolour Institute,’ at a meeting in September and invited Herbert with eight other notable artists to be foundation committee members; Arthur Streeton, John Eldershaw, Sydney Long, Matthew James MacNally, H. Septimus Power, John William Tristram and Blamire Young, each paying one guinea membership fee. Their inaugural exhibition at Anthony Horderns’ Fine Art Gallery, 25 March to 15 April 1924, was opened by the Governor of New South Wales, Admiral Sir Dudley de Chair.

Herbert was also member of the Victorian Artists Society, and NSW Society of Artists.

=== Influence ===
Influential in his conservatism, Herbert became a member of the Commonwealth Art Advisory Board in its establishment for a National Gallery, which however was not made political reality until 1965 under the second Menzies government and well after Herbert's death.

In 1927 he was co-opted beside Arthur Streeton; WB McInnes, Charles Wheeler, Napier Waller, Paul Montford and Alice Bale, by the National Gallery of Victoria trustees' Special Committee George Swinburne, JT Collins, John Longstaff and Norman MacGeorge to examine and report, employing their judgement as artists, on a consignment of Felton Bequest purchases of classical European art, most of which were refused by the committee. He promoted a Herbert ‘school’ of watercolour, an influence on following representational watercolourists. His art was used in designs for postage stamps and some promotional tourist posters.

A notorious bon-vivant, Herbert was an active member of the Melbourne Savage Club. Joan Kerr notes that his 28 August 1936 cover for the Club’s 170th "corroborree" for Lord Somers is typical of racist attitudes of the era; it depicts Aboriginal Dad, Mum with luggage, and son carrying the vice-regal hat, welcoming him with the caption “Boss Excellency, you come alonga us.” The 'Klub’ [sic] mia-mia is shown in the distance. From c.1936 Herbert illustrated stories for the Sun News-Pictorial.

== Illustrator and critic ==
Herbert was critic on The Australasian from 1927 to 1934 and there, in an article headed 'A Thought On Modern Art', wrote:

Some recent examples of so-called modern art shown here and in Sydney raise the question again as to the justification, if any, of the tendency to paint the grotesque and the ugly In a more or less unskilled manner, in order "to be different."

In a 1932 review of an exhibition by the group Twenty Melbourne Painters, he wrote;

This exhibition is not up to expectations. A predominance of small, unimportant works tends to make the show unimpressive, and a wall devoted to the "moderns" rather offends the eye.... The joyless landscapes by Mr. E. Kimpton certainly possess an atmospheric quality of cold greyness, but with this there is a morbidness that is forbidding. One experiences a shudder. Art is surely not meant for that.

He continued to promote such views in his work as critic from 1936 on both The Argus and The Australasian, in which roles he condemned the 'morbid' subject-matter of modern art. In 1937 Herbert became a foundation member of, and exhibited with, Robert Menzies' anti-modernist foundation, the Australian Academy of Art and supported its stance in his journalism.

Summing up Herbert’s position, Terry Ingram writing in The Financial Review labels him the “bête noire of Australian art history as the champion of the Menzies reaction against modern art.”

== War artist ==
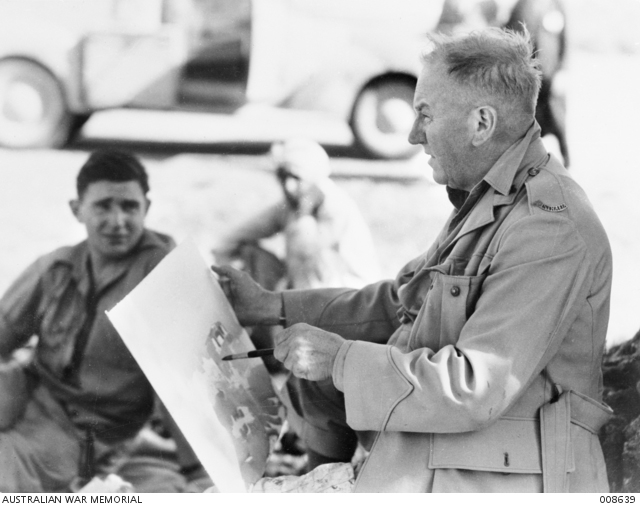
Damien Parer (1941) Harold Herbert painting in British Mandate of Palestine during WW2

Herbert was the first official, and one of the oldest, Australian war artists of World War 2, appointed through his friendship with Lieutenant-General Sir Thomas Blamey early in 1941, and he served for 6 months in the Australian Imperial Forces in the Middle East.

== Recognition ==
In 1928, critic J. S. Macdonald writing at length in a 156-page article 'Harold Herbert's Watercolours' with colour illustrations of his paintings and drawings in Art in Australia, praises Herbert's grasp of the medium;

Without recourse to any of the ruses sometimes employed by some water-colourists, Harold Herbert gets out of his favourite vehicle about as much as can possibly be got. Both his colour and his tonal scales are wide, and in his employment of the notes composing them he shows no favouritism. Strong colour contrasts or schemes approaching monotone; the opposition of full darks and lights or the closest of values do not tax the medium as he handles it. At the same time, he never makes the mistake of asking it to do the work of oil-colour. From water-colour he draws all the nuances he may require, and his decisive judgment places them just where and in what strength they are most needed...though exploiting his surroundings for the benefit of his handling, he does so with grace and the appearance of inevitability.

The National Gallery of Victoria presented a memorial retrospective exhibition of his work in 1945, and remembering him after his death that year Ivor Francis wrote;

Herbert was an all-out traditionalist, and in his newspaper reviews on contemporary art shows he found no language too scathing to express his disdain for modern art. He was one of a group who had developed the art of watercolor painting to a high technlcal perfection.

Welsford Smithers wrote the music and words To Harold Herbert : a toast to his memory in 1947.

== Personal life ==
Herbert married divorcee Doris Mary Donaghy, née Rodda on 19 October 1928; she divorced him in 1934 for desertion. He married Dorothea Agnes O'Leary at Fitzroy, Melbourne, on 9 October 1935. He died in Melbourne of cirrhosis of the liver on 11 February 1945, survived by Dorothea; they had no children.

== Exhibitions ==
- 1915: Centreway Gallery in Melbourne with four fellow Ballarat students
- 1924, 25 March–15 April: Inaugural Australian Watercolour Institute exhibition, Anthony Horderns’ Fine Art Gallery, Sydney
- 1924, May: Farmers Exhibition Hall, Sydney
- 1929, 21 February–2 March: The Artists' Society of Canberra, with other local and interstate artists.
- 1934, October: 25 Watercolours, Fine Art Galleries, Melbourne
- 1934, to 29 September: Newman Gallery; group show with sixteen other exhibitors, including John Shirlow, Victor Cobb, Oscar Binder, J. C. Goodhart, Sydney Ure Smith, Jessie C. Traill, Charles Nuttall, John C. Goodchild, Cyril Dillon and Allan Jordan.
- 1942, December: John Longstaff, Arthur Streeton, Ernest Buckmaster, Harold Herbert, Penlelgh Boyd, James R. Jackson, Robert Johnson, Daryl Lindsay, Norman Lindsay, Charles Wheeler, William Rowell. Sedon Galleries
- 1946, March: Water-colours and Oils by J. J. Hilder, R. W. Sturgess, James R. Jackson, Robert. Johnston, Sir John Longstaff, Norman Lindsay, Sir Lionel Lindsay, Charles Wheeler, Will Ashton, Fred McCubbin, Tom Roberts, W. B. Mcinnes, Harold Herbert, W. D. Knox, Blamire Young. Sedon Galleries

== Collections ==
- Australian National Gallery
- National Gallery of Victoria
- Castlemaine Art Museum
- Hamilton Gallery
- Ian Potter Museum of Art, University of Melbourne
- Sir William Dixson Collection,| State Library of NSW

== Gallery of Harold Herbert works ==
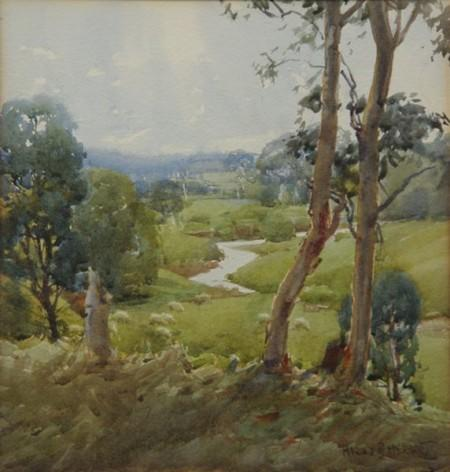

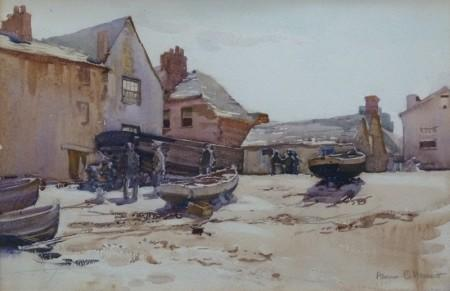

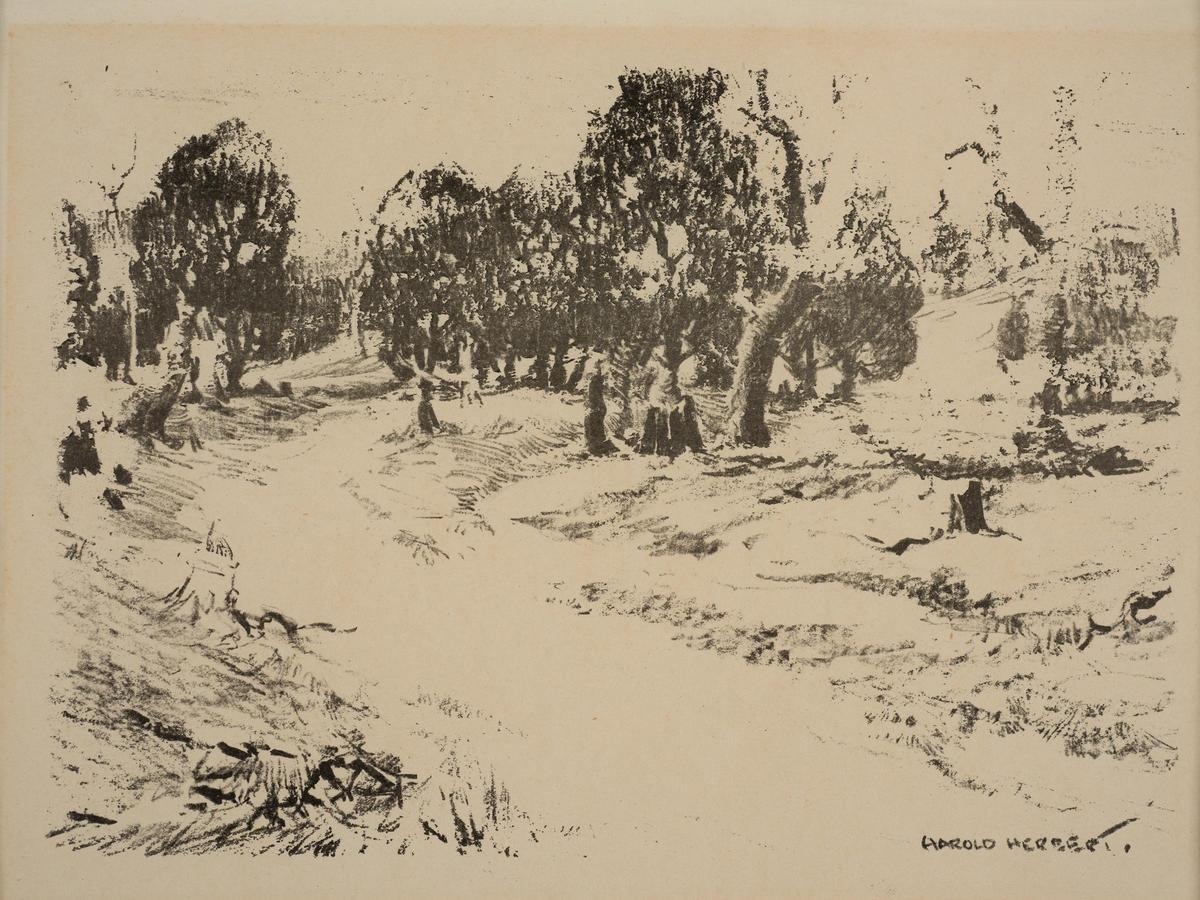

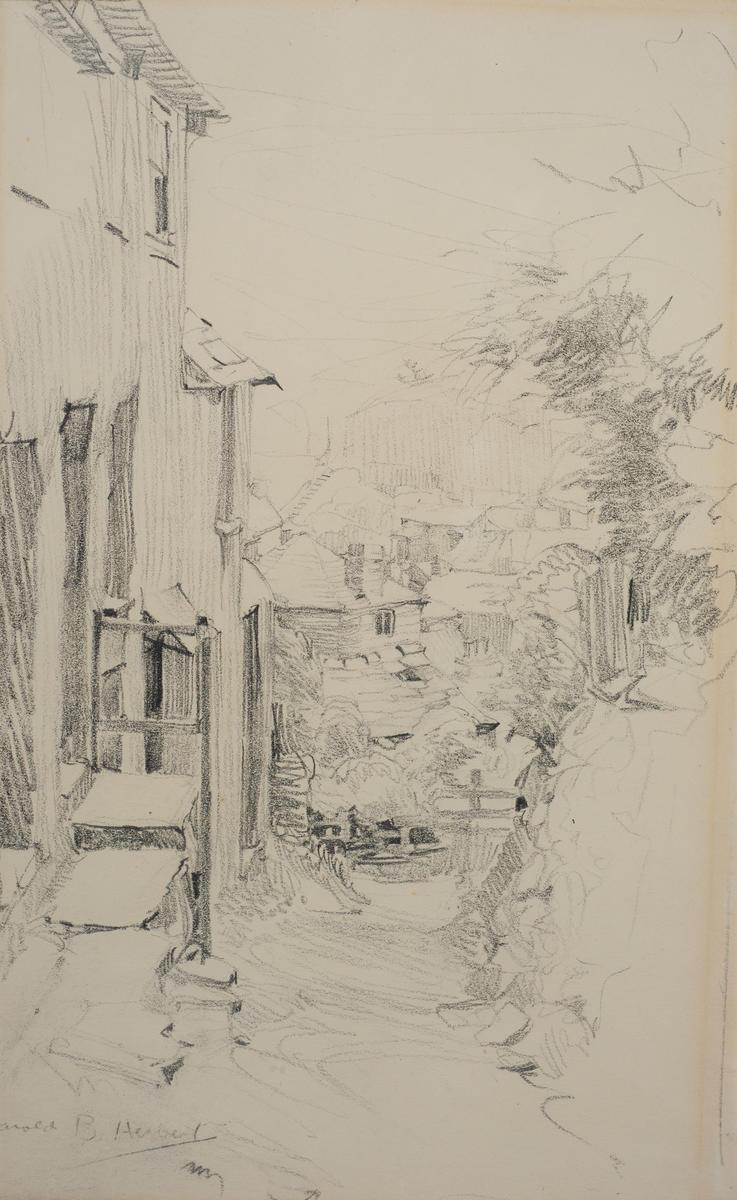

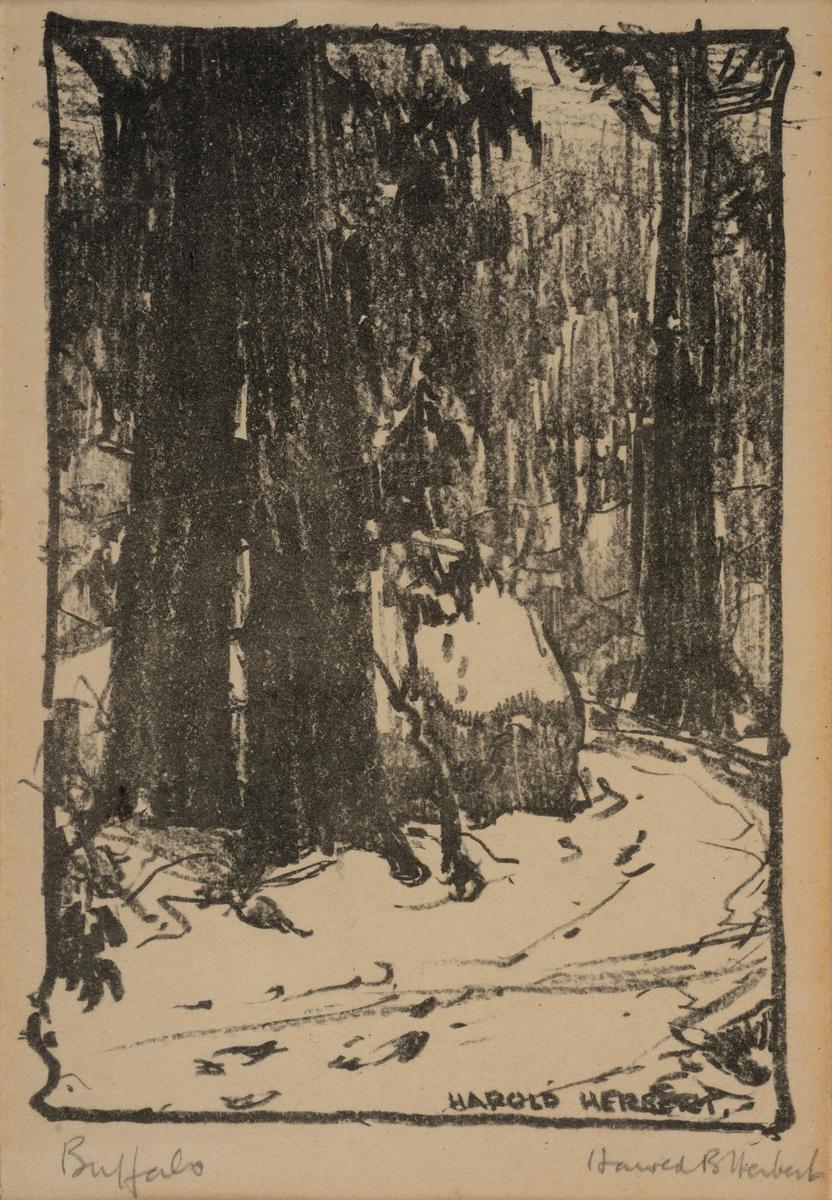

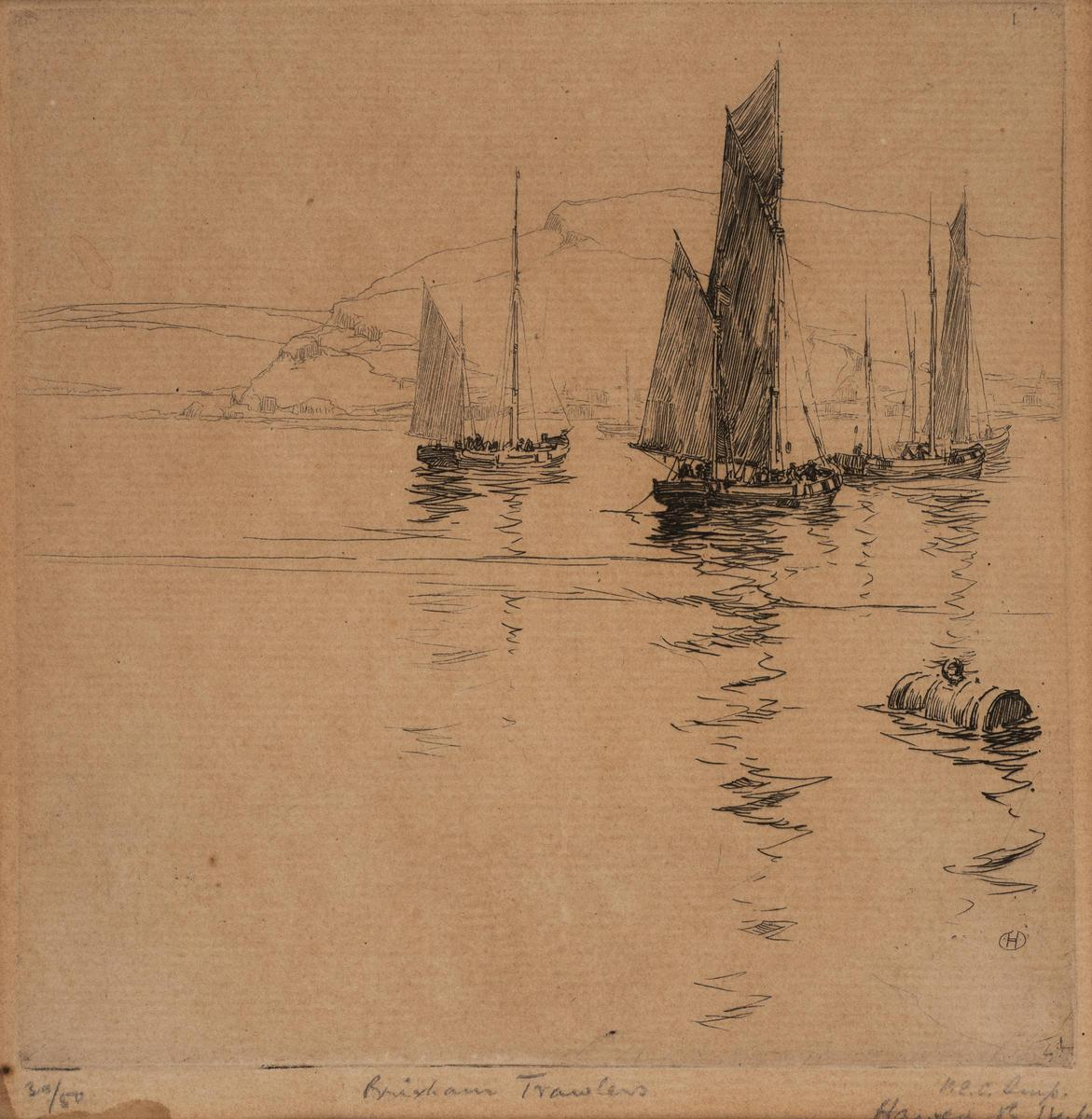

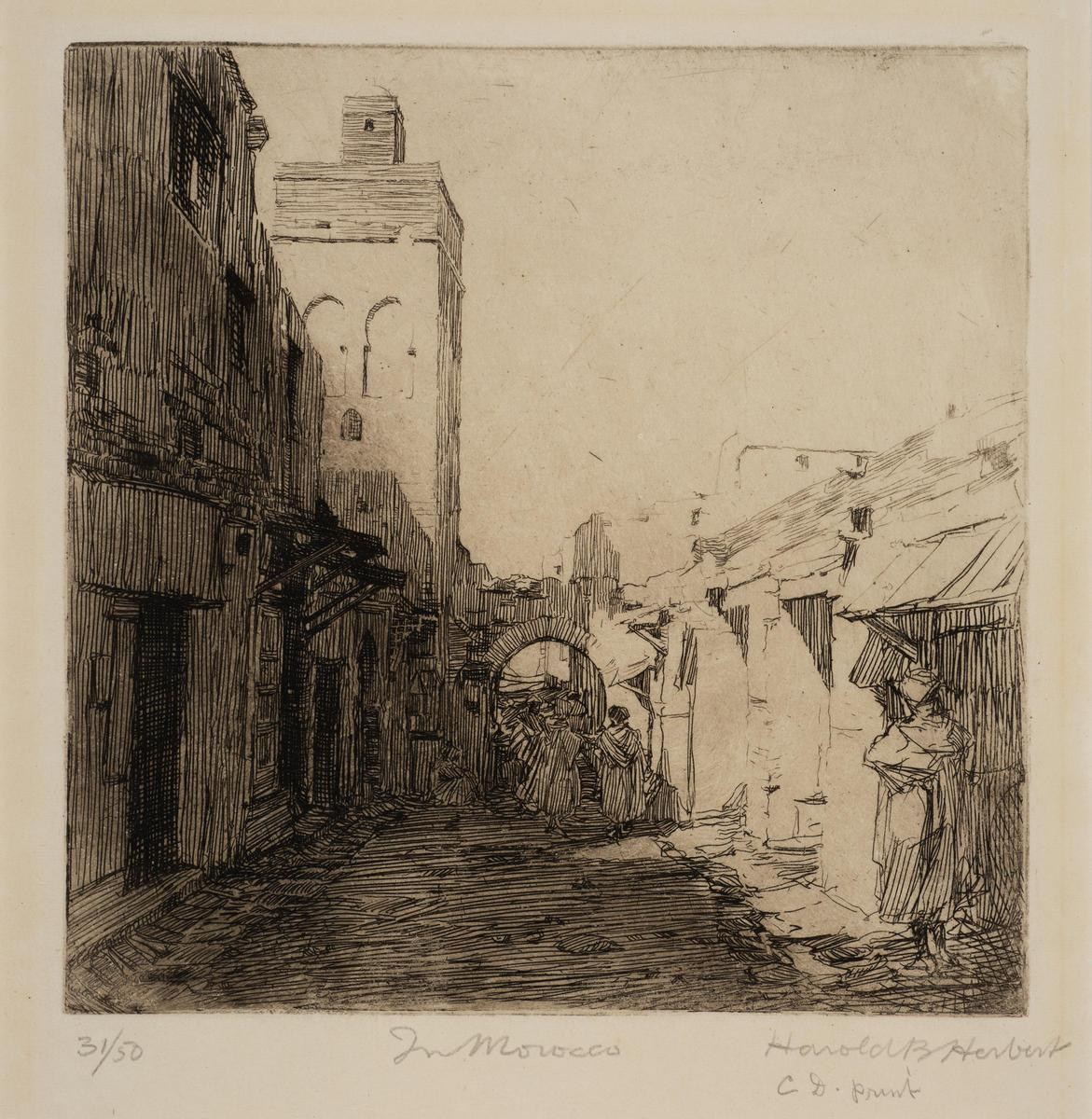

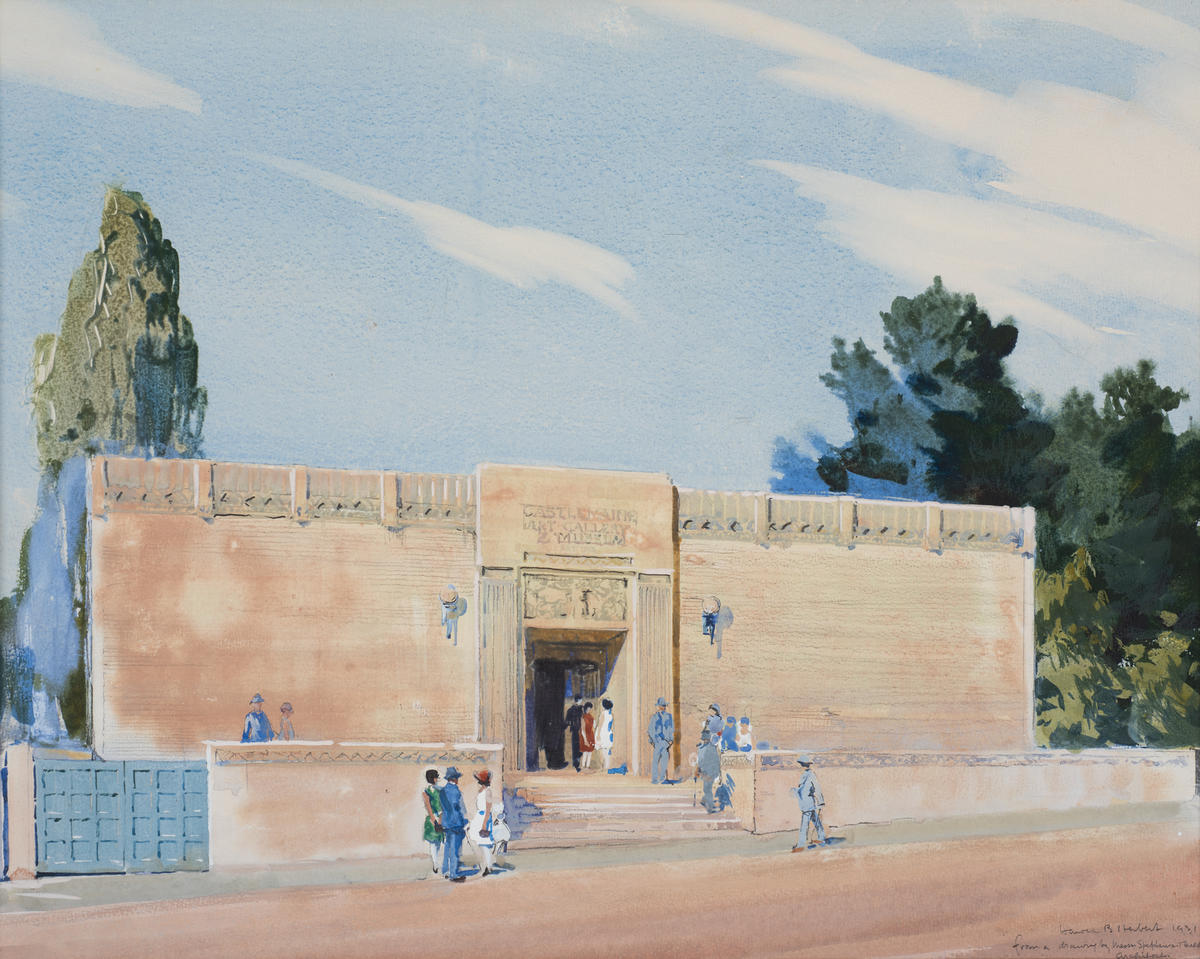

== See also ==
- James Stuart MacDonald
- Arthur Streeton
