= Russell Francis Wright =

Australian World War Two prisoner of war

Russell Francis Wright, MBE, Service number VX70200, was an Australian radio engineer and soldier.

== Early life and education ==
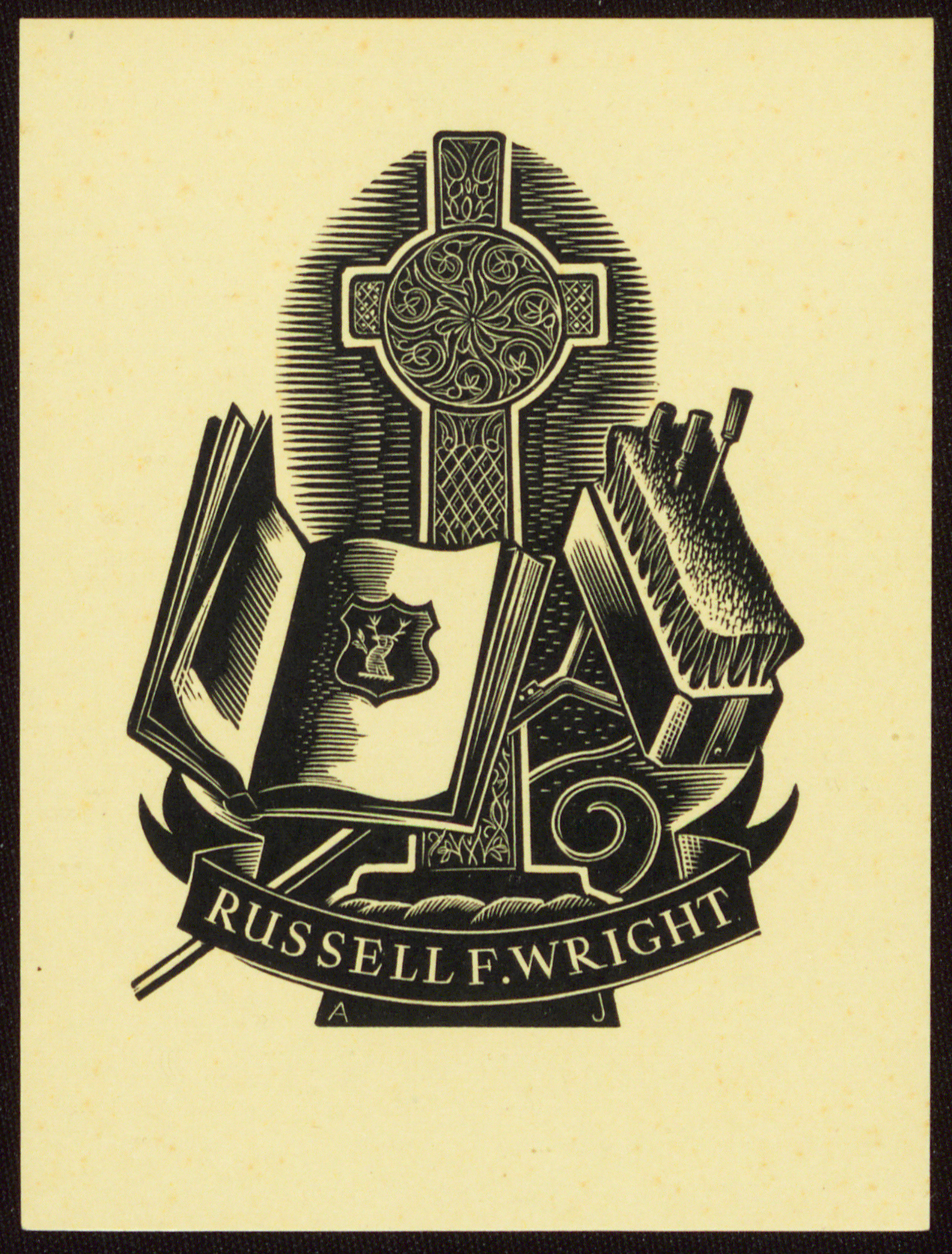
Bookplate by Allan Jordan depicting the broom radio Wright constructed as a P.o.W.

Russell Francis Wright was born in Melbourne September 28, 1920, the son of Col. Charles C. and Mrs. Jessie G. Wright and twin brother of Norman Douglas Wright ED, Lt. Col. He married Irma (nee Sanders) in 1956 and was the father of Col. Iain Wright and Dr Stuart Wright. He was educated at Scotch College, Melbourne where he constructed his own technically advanced radio receiver.

== World War Two ==
With the intention of following his father into the Army, Wright studied engineering at Melbourne University. After enlisting during World War II in 1942, he left Singapore aboard the Mata Hari on Australia Day when the ship was captured by the Japanese. He was made a prisoner of war in Changi Prison, where he and others built radios, concealing one receiver in a broom. Intelligence gathered by this means was vital to morale in the POW camp.

In 1947, Lieutenant Wright was made a Member of the Order of the British Empire "For highly meritorious service and outstanding ability."

== England ==
Following his education in Australia and his recovery from ill treatment by the Japanese, he pursued his studies of radio and engineering as a long time resident of England, gaining wide respect in the aircraft and nuclear power industries.

He died suddenly in England 22 April 2012, in his 92nd year and was buried at a funeral held in Caterham, England on May 10, 2012.
