= Jessie Traill =

Australian printmaker (1881–1967)

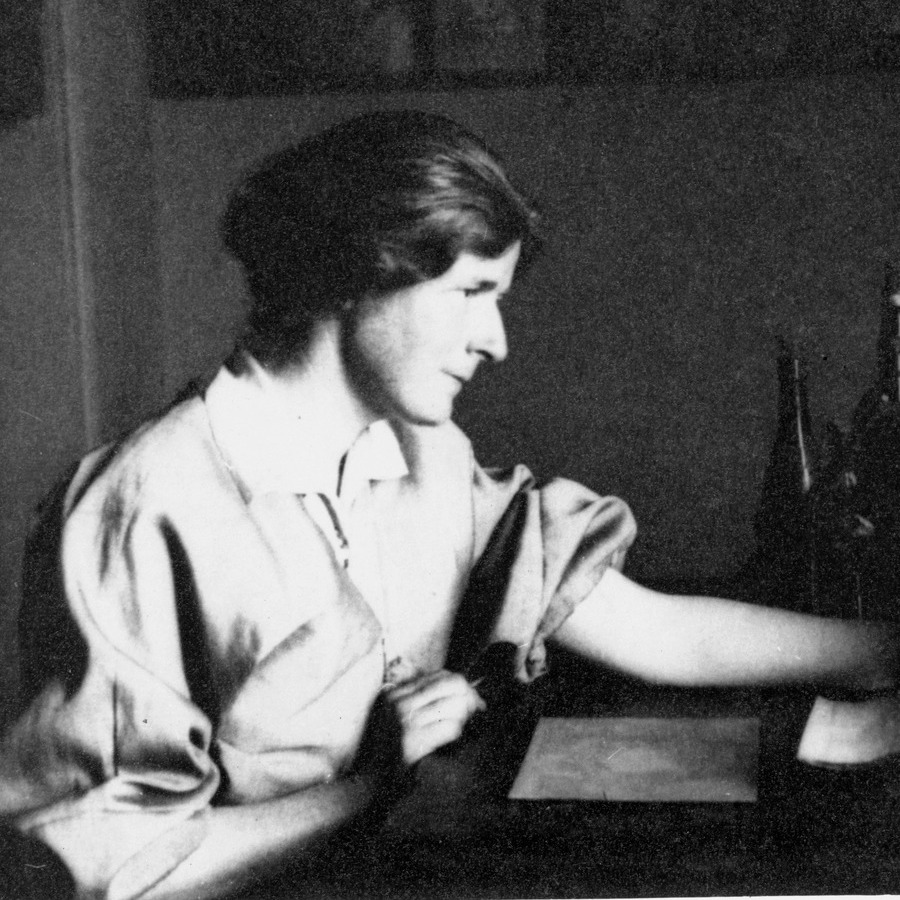
- Born: Jessie Constance Alicia Traill; 29 July 1881; Brighton, Victoria, Australia
- Died: 15 May 1967 (aged 85); Emerald, Victoria, Australia
- Education: Austral Art School, Melbourne; National Gallery of Victoria Art School, Melbourne
- Known for: Etching, Lithography
- Notable work: The red light, Harbour Bridge, June 1931 (1931); Building the Harbour Bridge VI: Nearly complete, June 1931 (1931)

Jessie Constance Alicia Traill (29 July 1881 – 15 May 1967) was an Australian printmaker. Trained by Frederick McCubbin at the National Gallery of Victoria Art School, and by painter and printmaker Frank Brangwyn in London, Traill worked in England and France in the period immediately preceding World War I. During the war she served in hospitals with the Voluntary Aid Detachment.

Traill is best known for a series of prints created in the early 1930s depicting the construction of the Sydney Harbour Bridge. Critic and art historian Sasha Grishin describes her as "one of the great Australian artists of the 20th century".

== Early life ==
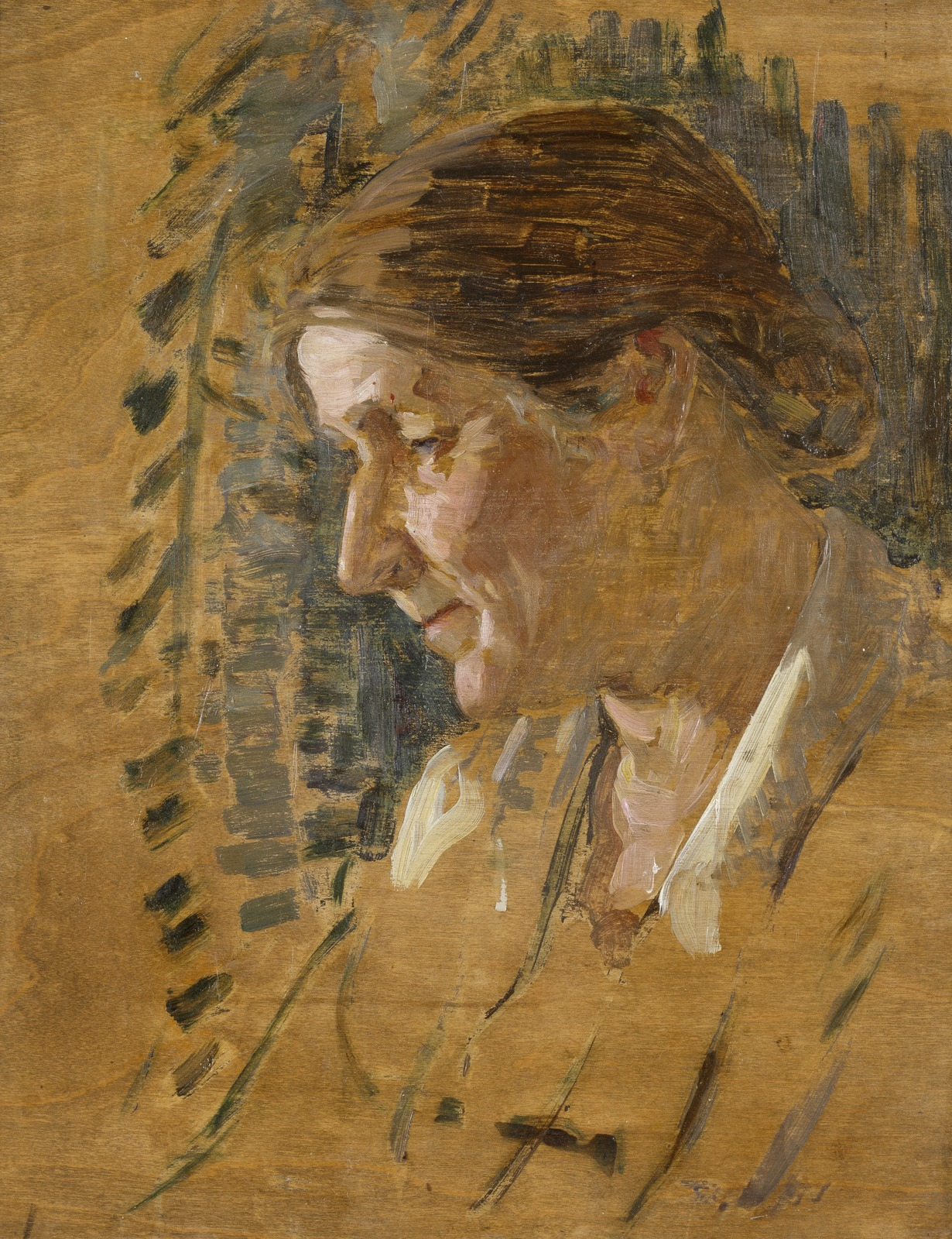
A portrait of Jessie Traill by her friend, fellow artist Dora Wilson (Pictures Collection, State Library Victoria)

Jessie Traill was born in Brighton, Victoria, on 29 July 1881. Her father was Scotland-born George Hamilton Traill, who had administered a vanilla plantation in the Seychelles, before becoming a bank manager in Victoria; her mother Jessie Neilley was Tasmanian.

Traill was one of four daughters of George and Jessie, all of them educated at a boarding school in Switzerland, where they learned French and German. The family were deeply religious Anglicans; two of Traill's sisters would later join religious orders, while Margaret would become a carver.

Returning to Australia, Traill in 1900 (Note: According to the Australian Dictionary of Biography, Traill studied with Mather from 1900; art critic Sasha Grishin places her commencement there at 1903.) studied under John Mather (artist) at his Austral Art School. In 1903 she kept a notebook of her lessons commenting on the etchings within it as they progress through various states. The notebook details her active engagement in the print making process and the tuition of John Mather. Together with jottings of sales, news clippings and a congratulatory letter from John Mather, her early success with the medium is documented. (Note: Jessie Traill's 1903 notebook reveals in intimate detail her lessons with John Mather. For example, the notes on an etching that Jessie Traill considered a failure: Ground marked twice lines far too open & apart no mysterious depths drawing shaky, confused & altogether a failure, Mr Mather could not tell which way up. Mounted at 90 degrees from her notes and without visual cues, the correct orientation of the etching is difficult to determine. Later in the etching, Boat Builder's Shop, she includes some common place items in the foreground that leave no doubt as to the orientation of that etching. Boat Builder's Shop was exhibited in Melbourne, Adelaide and Launceston in 1905. The etching was praised in reviews and sold for 15/0. John Mather sent her a congratulatory letter which she mounts in the notebook together with news clippings of the day. In 1906 she notes that the etching has been sold to Lady Northcote, wife of Australia's Governor-General Sir Henry Northcote 1904 -1908.)

Jessie Traill also studied at the National Gallery of Victoria Art School from 1902 to 1906, (Note: Kirby states the period was 1901 to 1905.) where she was taught by a leading member of the Heidelberg School, Frederick McCubbin. Her fellow students were mostly women and included Hilda Rix Nicholas, Norah Gurdon, Ruth Sutherland, Dora Wilson, and Vida Lahey. In March 1906, Traill and her sister Minna, together with her father, sailed for England, while her two older sisters, Kathleen and Elsie, remained in Victoria. George died while they were travelling in 1907, and is buried in Rome.

Traill studied in London under Anglo-Welsh painter and printmaker Frank Brangwyn, as well as taking classes in summer with him, in Belgium and the Netherlands.

== Early career, 1908 to 1931 ==
Traill's first notable successes were in 1909, when works by the artist were hung at the Paris Salon and London's Royal Academy of Arts, while her first solo show was opened in Melbourne. She was successful again in 1914 with work hung at the Royal Academy.

When war broke out in 1914 Traill, like fellow artist Iso Rae, joined the Voluntary Aid Detachment. She worked in hospitals, including at a convalescent facility in Roehampton in May 1915, then later in a military hospital in Rouen. Traill and Rae became the only Australian women artists to portray the war while in France. When in 1918 Australia first appointed official war artists, sixteen men were chosen; Traill was not included.

Back in Australia, Traill in 1921 became a member of the Australian Painter-Etchers' Society, and entered its exhibitions. Her works from this period reflected her interest in both Art Nouveau and in the woodblock printing of Japan.

== Sydney Harbour Bridge series ==
When the Australian Painter-Etchers Society in 1932 held its only thematic exhibition, Sydney Harbour Bridge Celebrations, Traill contributed a series of seven prints. The works comprised six etchings completed across the period 1927 to 1931, and a coloured aquatint created after construction was finished in 1932. These have become Traill's best known and most highly regarded images. At the time they were created, the artist Arthur Streeton observed:

Melbourne should be proud of that fine draughtswoman and etcher Miss Jessie Traill. By incessant labour and observation she has won for herself a high position by her fine sense of design and her most capable rendering of very difficult subjects. She dares to do a large drawing composed of enormous curves and angles and she does it successfully. There is no other artist in Australia today who can compare with her in the fine and varied exhibition of Sydney Bridge and other designs which will open today at the Athenaeum Gallery. Her drawings of the Harbour Bridge from 1927 to 1931 form a triumphant and original record of that mighty masterpiece of steel, and it would be well if the finest of them were acquired and housed as a national collection and an artistic record of the structure.

Describing the series as "perhaps the finest representations of this genre", National Gallery of Australia curator Roger Butler singled out her Building the Harbour Bridge VI: Nearly complete, June 1931 for comment, with its "towering, skeletal structure framed by foreground cranes". Sandy Kirby, writing for The National Women's Art Book in the mid-1990s, focussed on the earlier, fourth print in the series, Building the Harbour Bridge IV: The Ant's Progress, noting how it drew attention "to the technical feat of building, reflected as much in the viewpoint Traill selected as in the very medium of etching itself, with its linear emphasis echoing engineering drawing".

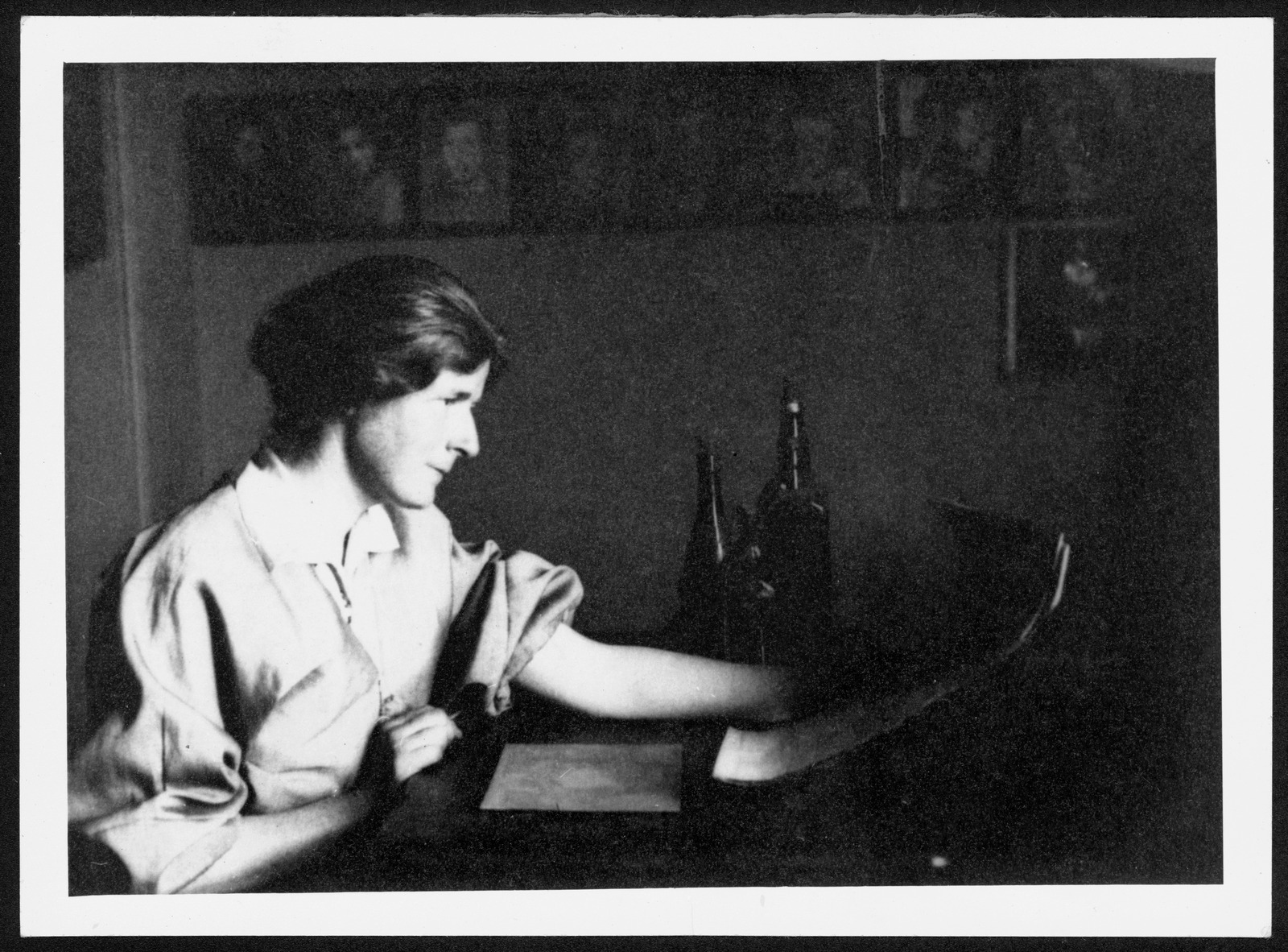
Jessie Traill proofing an etching by subdued light, (H2000.63/6, Pictures Collection, State Library Victoria)

Reviewing an exhibition of Traill's works, art critic Christopher Allen, writing for The Australian in 2013, considered the images of Sydney Harbour Bridge to be "her greatest achievement".

== Later career, 1932 to 1967 ==
In 1935, Dora Wilson, artist and longstanding friend of Traill (they had studied together and shared a Melbourne studio), painted a portrait of Traill, which was acquired by the State Library of Victoria. Another portrait of Traill, by Janet Cumbrae Stewart, is held by the National Gallery of Victoria.

Traill died on 15 May 1967 at Emerald, on the eastern fringes of Melbourne.

== Technique ==
As a printmaker, Traill worked on zinc plates in etching and aquatint. Her biographer Mary Lee observed that in the 1920s Traill "worked with the largest plates that the press would take and achieved dramatic chiaroscuro". She was also a lithographer, a technique in which she was similarly accomplished.

== Exhibitions ==
- 1934, to 29 September: Newman Gallery; group show with sixteen other exhibitors, including John Shirlow, Victor Cobb, Oscar Binder, J. C. Goodhart, Sydney Ure Smith, Allan Jordan, Harold Herbert, John C. Goodchild, Cyril Dillon and Charles Nuttall.

== Legacy ==
Butler collected works by Traill throughout his tenure at the National Gallery of Australia, which one reviewer considered was responsible for the "rediscovery of an artist previously almost unknown to the public". When the Gallery held a retrospective of her work in 2013, it described her as "a key figure in the history of Australian printmaking". Author and art critic Sasha Grishin reviewed the exhibition for The Canberra Times, concluding that the show "reasserts the supremacy of Jessie Traill as one of the great Australian artists of the 20th century". Roger Butler observed of Traill's etchings that they were "the most poetic and technically refined prints produced in Australia before World War II".

== Notes and references ==
Notes

Bibliography

- Butler, Roger (2007). Printed. Images by Australian Artists 1885–1955. Canberra, ACT: National Gallery of Australia. ISBN 978-0642-54204-5.
- Kirby, Sandy (1995). "Town & Country (Jessie Traill)". In Joan Kerr and Anita Callaway (ed.). Heritage: The National Women's Art Book. Roseville East, NSW: G + B Arts International / Craftsman House. pp. 201–202. ISBN 976-6410 45-3.
- Kirby, Sandy (1995a). "Traill, Jessie Constance Alicia". In Joan Kerr and Anita Callaway (ed.). Heritage: The National Women's Art Book. Roseville East, NSW: G + B Arts International / Craftsman House. p. 465. ISBN 976-6410 45-3.
- Pigot, John (2000). Hilda Rix Nicholas: Her Life and Art. Carlton South, Victoria: The Miegunyah Press at Melbourne University Press. ISBN 0-522-84890-7.
