= John Shirlow =

Australian artist

John Alexander Thomas Shirlow (13 December 1869 – 22 June 1936) was an Australian artist.

== Exhibitions ==
- 1931, 3 November – 17 December: Group show with Allan Jordan, Esther Paterson and Charles Nuttall. Fine Art Galleries, Melbourne
- 1934, to 29 September: Newman Gallery; group show with sixteen other exhibitors, including Allan Jordan, Victor Cobb, Oscar Binder, J. C. Goodhart, Sydney Ure Smith, Jessie C. Traill, Harold Herbert, John C. Goodchild, Cyril Dillon and Charles Nuttall.
