= John C. Goodchild =

Painter and art educator in South Australia (1898–1980)

John Charles Goodchild (30 March 1898 – 9 February 1980) was a painter and art educator in South Australia who mastered the mediums of pen drawing, etching and watercolors. His wife, Doreen Goodchild (8 March 1900 – 28 February 1998), was also a significant South Australian artist.

== History ==
Goodchild was born in Southwark, London, the fourth son of John Goodchild (ca.1873 – 13 March 1939) and his wife Jessie Mary, née White (ca.1874 – 13 November 1948), and was educated at the Strand School, London. In 1913 the family emigrated to South Australia, where young John worked as a signwriter before enlisting in the First AIF in 1917, and served as a stretcher bearer with the 9th Field Ambulance in France, where he was wounded in 1918. While recuperating in hospital he made a series of sketches for the Army field paper Digger. After the war he was commissioned by the Australian Government to produce a series of thirty six pen drawings of war graves for the book Where Australians Rest, published in Melbourne 1920. Returning to Adelaide, he resumed studies with the South Australian School of Arts and Crafts, and produced a book of drawings of Adelaide landmarks and taught etching at the School of Arts and Crafts. In 1923 he held a one-man exhibition of his etchings in Adelaide and participated in an exhibition in Sydney.

In 1926 he married fellow South Australian artist Doreen Rowley. They studied at the Central School of Arts and Crafts in London for two years.

Rowley attended St Peter's Girls College, Adelaide, where she excelled at drawing, and on leaving school studied at the South Australian School of Arts and Crafts, then Dattilo Rubbo's school in Sydney. She was an active member of the Society of Arts.
After her marriage to John Goodchild and their sojourn in London, she concentrated on ceramic work; her Art Nouveau figures and animals, examples of which are held by the National Gallery, Canberra, and the Art Gallery of South Australia, were well received. The National Gallery also carries examples of her black-and-white printmaking. She also painted landscapes and portraits in oils.
She began writing poetry dealing with the experience of bringing up her three children. Her husband learned the art of bookbinding for the express purpose of producing, in 1953, 240 copies of Pattern of the Years, her collected poetry, which he printed on his small offset press.

In 1929 they established a studio in Adelaide and John began exhibiting his water colours with the South Australian Society of Arts of which he was a prominent member and its president 1937-1940. Around 1935 he and F. Millward Grey were commissioned by the South Australian Tourist Bureau to produce a series of posters which were extensively used on railway station billboards and elsewhere. He was gazetted to the board of the Public Library, Museum and Art Gallery in 1938, and served in that capacity for much of the next thirty years. He served as principal of the School of Arts and Crafts from 1941 to 1945.

In March 1945 he and Max Ragless were commissioned by the Australian War Memorial board as South Australia's official war artists; he painted several watercolors of RAAF aircraft in flight. He was present at the signing of the Japanese surrender aboard the USS Missouri on 2 September 1945.

In 1946 he worked for the Adelaide News as staff cartoonist. He produced several works for commercial houses such as F. H. Faulding & Co, on the occasion of their centenary. He produced a series of oil paintings for Elder, Smith & Co. Ltd. depicting landmarks associated with the company's history.

== Exhibitions ==
- 1934, to 29 September: Newman Gallery; group show with sixteen other exhibitors, including John Shirlow, Victor Cobb, Oscar Binder, J. C. Goodhart, Sydney Ure Smith, Jessie C. Traill, Harold Herbert, Allan Jordan, Cyril Dillon and Charles Nuttall.

== Miscellaneous works ==
Goodchild designed the distinctive lamps and standards which grace the Adelaide City Bridge, King William Road, opened 1931.

== Bibliography ==
- John C. Goodchild Exhibition of etchings and pen and ink and pencil drawings by John C. Goodchild Adelaide : Tyrrell's Ltd, 1923.
- John C. Goodchild Drawings of Adelaide Tyrrell's, Adelaide, S.A. 1924.
- John C. Goodchild catalogue of the exhibition of pictures, May 26th and the following fourteen days. Preece's Gallery, Adelaide 1925.
- Mary E. Fullerton; Illustrated by John C. Goodchild The Australian bush J.M. Dent, The outward bound library, London 1928
- John C. Goodchild / South Australian Society of Arts A catalogue of the exhibition of watercolours, pottery, etchings, etc. by John & Doreen Goodchild. John McGrath Ltd. Adelaide, S. Aust., 1929.
- Doreen Goodchild Pattern of the years Printed by J.C. Goodchild, Unley Park, S. Aust. ca.1953
- Judith Brooks / research by Doreen Goodchild John C. Goodchild, 1898–1980 : his life & art pub. D. Goodchild (Glen Osmond, S. Aust.) ca.1983.

== Family ==
He married Doreen Rowley on 22 April 1926; they lived at 5 Bellevue Place, Unley Park and had three children.
