= John Borrack =

Australian artist (born 1933)

John Borrack (born 1933) is an Australian landscape painter working in watercolour, gouache and oils.

== Life ==
Borrack was born in Melbourne, Victoria, Australian 1933 and studied painting and drawing at RMIT obtaining an Associate Diploma of Fine Art in 1960, followed by a Fellowship Diploma in 1972. He studied in France, Spain, the U.K., and Italy from the 1960s to the 1990s.

He Lectured in painting and drawing at Melbourne State College from 1969 to 1982 when he began painting full-time.

Borack is represented in numerous private and public collections in Australia including the National Gallery of Victoria, Queensland Art Gallery, Museum and Art Gallery of the Northern Territory and regional Galleries in Benalla, Bendigo, Castlemaine, Geelong, Hamilton, Horsham, Rockhampton, Gippsland at Sale, Swan Hill and Warrnambool.

Living in Mernda, Victoria for much of his working life, he has documented changing landscapes in the Plenty Valley his connection to the region going back to the original 1850 German settlers at Westgarthtown, the Ziebell family, through his mother Augusta Caroline Borrack. Comprehensive survey of his work were published in 1996. and 2012.

== Select exhibitions and works ==
- Borrack, John (2001). John Borrack. Greythorn Galleries, Toorak, Vic
- Borrack, John & Australian Galleries Pty. Ltd (1986). John Borrack. Australian Galleries, Collingwood, Vic
- Borrack, John & Benalla Art Gallery (1987). John Borrack : selected works 1958 to 1987. Benalla Art Gallery, Benalla
- Whittlesea Council & Borrack, John, 1913- & Solomou, Bill & Borrack, Gillian (2002). The John and Gillian Borrack Federation bequest. City of Whittlesea, South Morang, Vic
- Borrack, John, 1933-. (1998). Lamplight and bluestones : recollections of the Ziebell farm at Thomastown Melbourne : The author
