= Ethleen Palmer =

Australian artist

- Born: Ethleen Mary Palmer; 1 August 1906; Johannesburg, South Africa
- Died: 8 April 1958 (aged 51); Newtown, New South Wales
- Known for: Linocut
- Awards: Linocut section, 150th Anniversary Art Competition

Ethleen Palmer (1 August 1906 – 8 April 1958) was an Australian printmaker who specialised in linocuts.

== Early life ==
Ethleen Mary Palmer was born in Johannesburg, South Africa in 1906 to John Edwin Palmer and Ada Beatrice Bloxham. Her father was a businessman and her mother a singer, and she had an older sister called Beatrice Helen. The family lived in South Africa, France, and England before arriving in Sydney in 1921. While enrolled at Moore Park Girls' High School she won an art scholarship to the East Sydney Technical College. At the College she studied drawing, painting, sculpture, and architecture. There she was taught by Rayner Hoff and Phyllis Shillito.

== Career ==
Her first work as a commercial artist was with the firm Stott and Underwood. She suffered from illness in the late 1920s which prevented her from exhibiting. Her first learning in linocuts came from a book she borrowed from the Municipal Library. Armed with homemade tools – an ordinary pen knife, tissue paper, paints, and Japanese vellum – she fashioned her first work, a poorly cut little blue wren, from linoleum. In 1934 she exhibited her linocuts of birds with the Society of Arts and Crafts of N.S.W. alongside Eirene Mort, Ethel Spowers, and Eveline Syme. Her works of monkeys and squirrels were compared to the style of Bresslern-Roth. Palmer was involved with the Women's Industrial Art Society, formed out of the Society of Women Painters, with the stated aim of assisting girls to exhibit their work and become more widely known.

She achieved much success in 1936 with two of her linocuts being acquired by the Adelaide Art Gallery. She opened her first solo exhibition the same year at the Margaret McLean Gallery in Melbourne. Her work won second prize in a landscape painting competition held by the Women's Industrial Art Society and won the linocut section in the 150th Anniversary Art Competition. Palmer had a joint exhibition with Katharine Sheridan at the Wynyard Book Club in Sydney. She continued her presence outside Sydney, exhibiting with the Arts and Crafts Society of Victoria and the Royal South Australian Society of Arts. Her success in the field of linocuts led to her being appointed as a lecturer to the art department of the East Sydney Technical College in 1938. She designed the cover for the August 1939 issue of Art in Australia.

In the 1940s Palmer moved from linocuts to serigraphs. She was one of the first Australian female artists to use this method for print production. Her sister Beatrice helped her start a small but successful business screen printing cards. Palmer presented on ABC Radio on Christmas card and calendar ideas. She was also a guest of honor at the Lyceum Club where she spoke on colour prints.

Palmer was responsible for organising a group of members of the Society of Arts and Crafts of N.S.W. to visit the 113th Australian General Hospital (A.G.H.) at Concord to teach handicrafts to the returned soldiers. In 1945 she founded her own craft school in Double Bay where she taught and mentored female artists. Other teachers at the school included Amie Kingston, Thea Proctor, and Muriel Medworth. Palmer herself personally directed the fortnightly correspondence course. She won the Elizabeth Soderberg Memorial Prize at the Society of Arts and Crafts of N.S.W. annual exhibition in 1950. As part of their 1952 exhibition she gave a lecture on screen printing. Her work had her exhibiting alongside other noted female artists of the time Dora Toovey and Janet Cumbrae Stewart.

== Legacy ==
After a short illness Palmer died in 1958. She was survived by her sister Beatrice who managed to save a trunk of Ethleen's art works from perishing in a house fire in Warrimoo. These works formed the basis of an exhibition at the Ward Gallery in 1980.

The most significant collection of her work is held by the National Gallery of Australia totalling 81 works though she is also represented in the Art Gallery of South Australia, the Queensland Art Gallery, the National Gallery of Victoria, and the Art Gallery of New South Wales.
