= Mantzaris =

Mantzaris (Greek: Μάντζαρης) is a Greek surname. Notable people with the surname include:

- Antonis Mantzaris (born 1986), Greek basketball player
- Diane Mantzaris (born 1962), Australian artist
- Vangelis Mantzaris (born 1990), Greek basketball player
