= Anna Mary Winifred Brotherton =

Australian (1874–1956)

Anna Mary Winnifred Brotherton
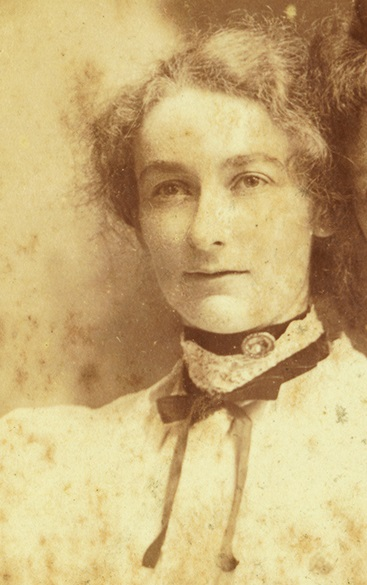
- Portrait of Winnie Brotherton in 1901.
- Born: 1874; Melbourne, Victoria, Australia
- Died: 1956 (aged 81–82); Australia
- Occupations: Botanical collector, Red Cross Bureau volunteer, Girl Guide leader, and a founding member of the Castlemaine Art Museum
- Years active: 1894–1895 (botanical collector)

Anna Mary Winifred Brotherton (1874–1956), better known as Winnie Brotherton, was a founder of the Castlemaine Art Museum, a Red Cross volunteer, Girl Guide leader, and botanical collector who corresponded with Ferdinand von Mueller.

== Life ==
Born in Melbourne, in her youth her family moved to Woodlands, an estate on Burnett Road near the Castlemaine Botanical Gardens where she remained until a significant fire. Winnie attended Castlemaine Grammar School, and matriculated at the University of Melbourne in 1891. She organised for academics in Melbourne to travel to Castlemaine and give lectures for the education of the community.

She was closely associated with the wider Victorian artistic community of the time. Her sister, the amateur poet and artist Alice Brotherton, married G. Rodney Cherry who exhibited his photography at the Victorian Academy of Arts. Her cousin was the New Zealand painter Frances Mary Hodgkins.

In 1913 a committee of women, including Brotherton, established the Castlemaine Art Gallery and Historical Museum (CAGHM). Brotherton took the minutes, "emphasised the imperative of establishing a museum in which to preserve the heritage of the town, and the museum was later to be given her name in her honour."

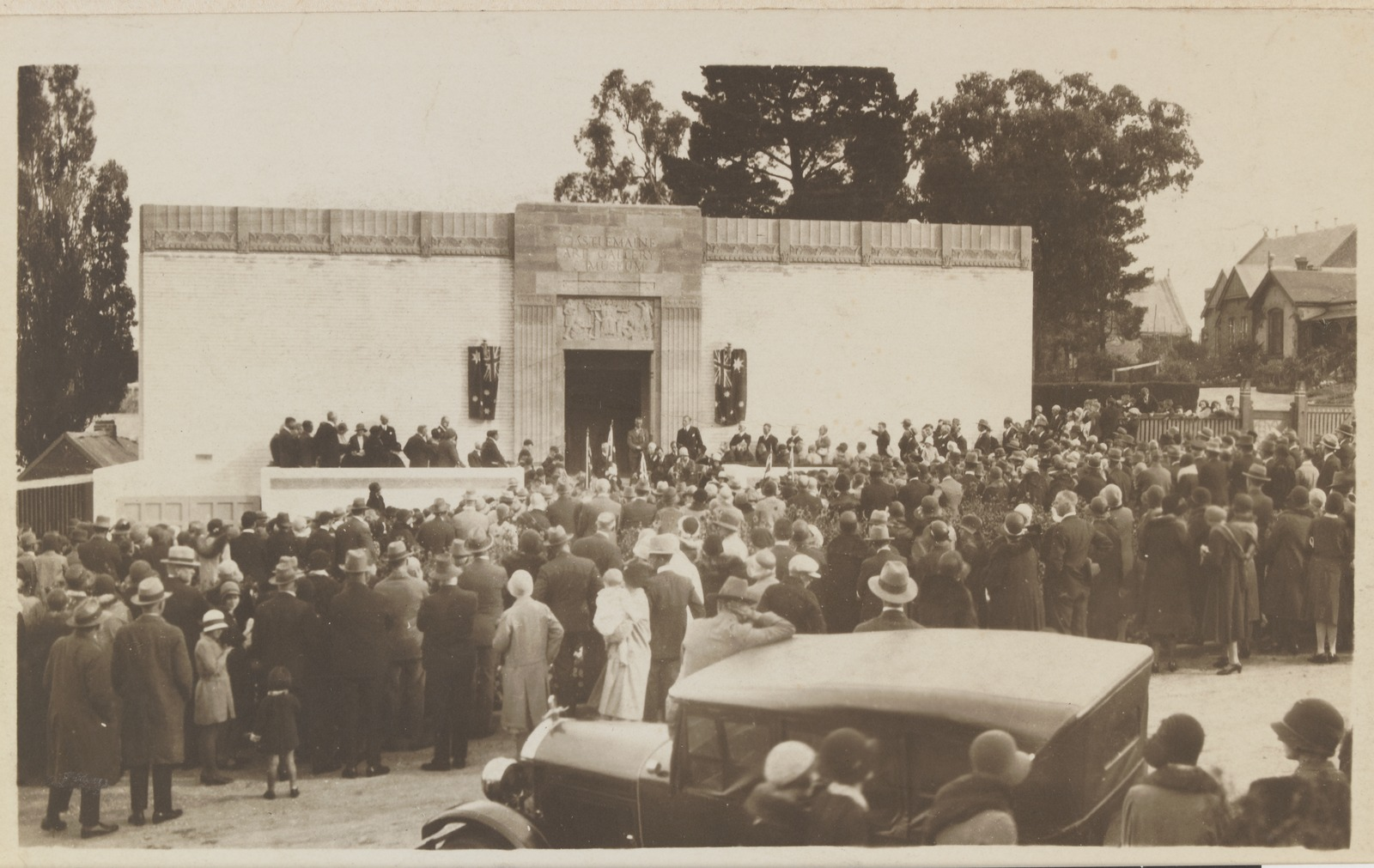
Opening of the Castlemaine Art Gallery and Historical Museum in 1931

Her attendance at the opening of the custom-built Castlemaine Art Gallery and Museum in 1931 was immortalised in a sketch of Castlemaine Stalwarts by the cartoonist Samuel Garnet Wells (1885-1972). Furthermore, she received an award for thanks from the Girl Guides Association in 1956, along with her niece. As noted by Marjorie Theobald, she is the only woman depicted in the sketch, but it is telling that she is not identified as a founder of the gallery, but by her role in the Guiding movement as a district commissioner, a position that she held until 1934. By 1953, Miss Brotherton was described as the curator of the historical section of the Castlemaine Art Museum. Her archives are held at the art gallery.

After her sister Alice's early death, her daughter Nan Brotherton-Cherry was raised by her aunt, Winnie, and in the 1920s they were both involved in running "a boarding school for children of special needs."

== The Australian Red Cross Wounded and Missing Bureau, London ==
During the First World War, on Boxing Day 1916, Winifred Brotherton and her niece travelled to England, and by 1917 had joined the London office of the Australian Red Cross Wounded and Missing Bureau. She was assigned to the records department at the Australian Imperial Force (A.I.F.) headquarters on Horseferry Road in Westminster and in the evenings worked at the Enquiry Bureau headquarters on Grosvenor Place in Belgravia. In 1918 she was awarded with a "silver badge for meritorious service."

== Botanical interests and botanical collections ==
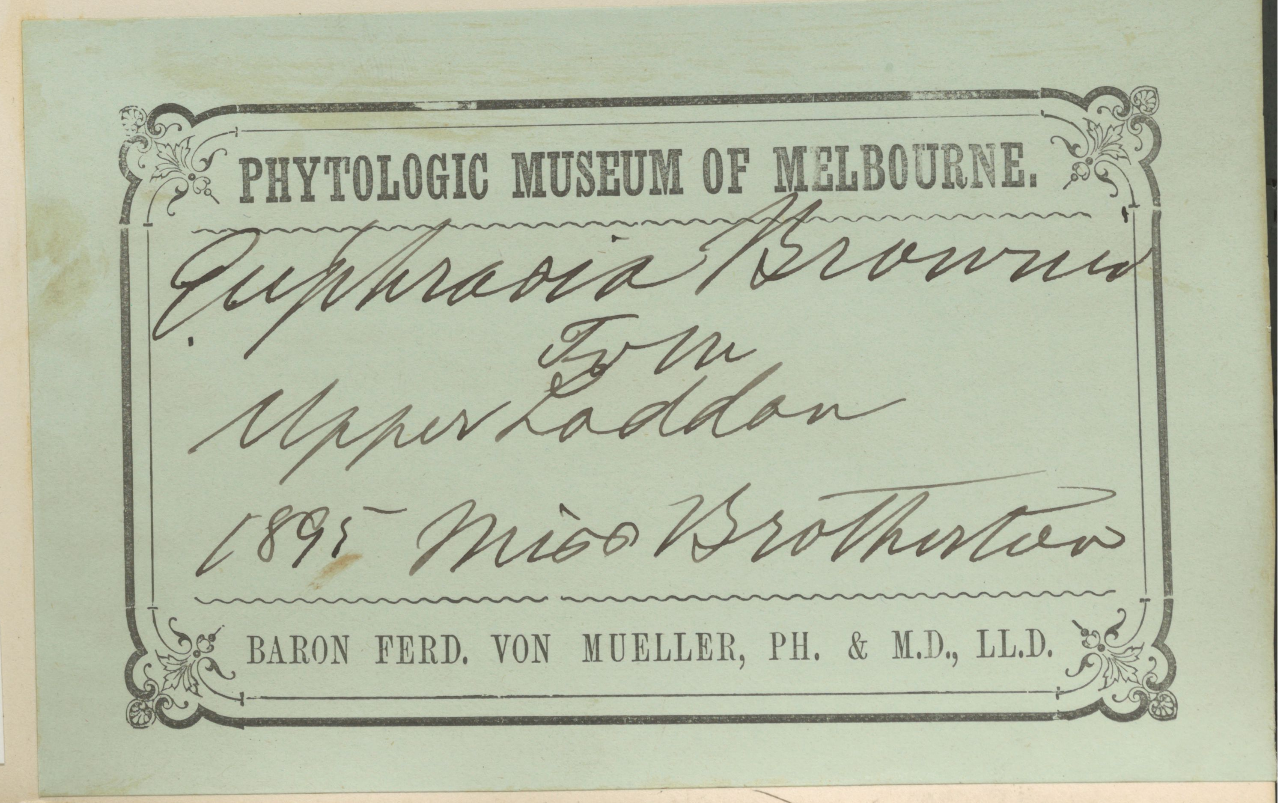
Example of a herbarium specimen label associated with Miss Brotherton's collecting activities.

Brotherton was a member of the Castlemaine Field Ramblers Club. She corresponded with Ferdinand von Mueller regarding the identification of local wildflowers, and Mueller had been acquainted with her father.

The specimens collected by Miss Brotherton around the Castlemaine district are today held in herbarium collections around the world, distributed by Mueller. This includes the National Herbarium of Victoria, Royal Botanic Gardens Victoria, the Academy of Natural Sciences of Drexel University, the National Museum of Natural History, and the William and Lynda Steere Herbarium.
