= Castlemaine Art Museum =

Art gallery and museum in Victoria, Australia

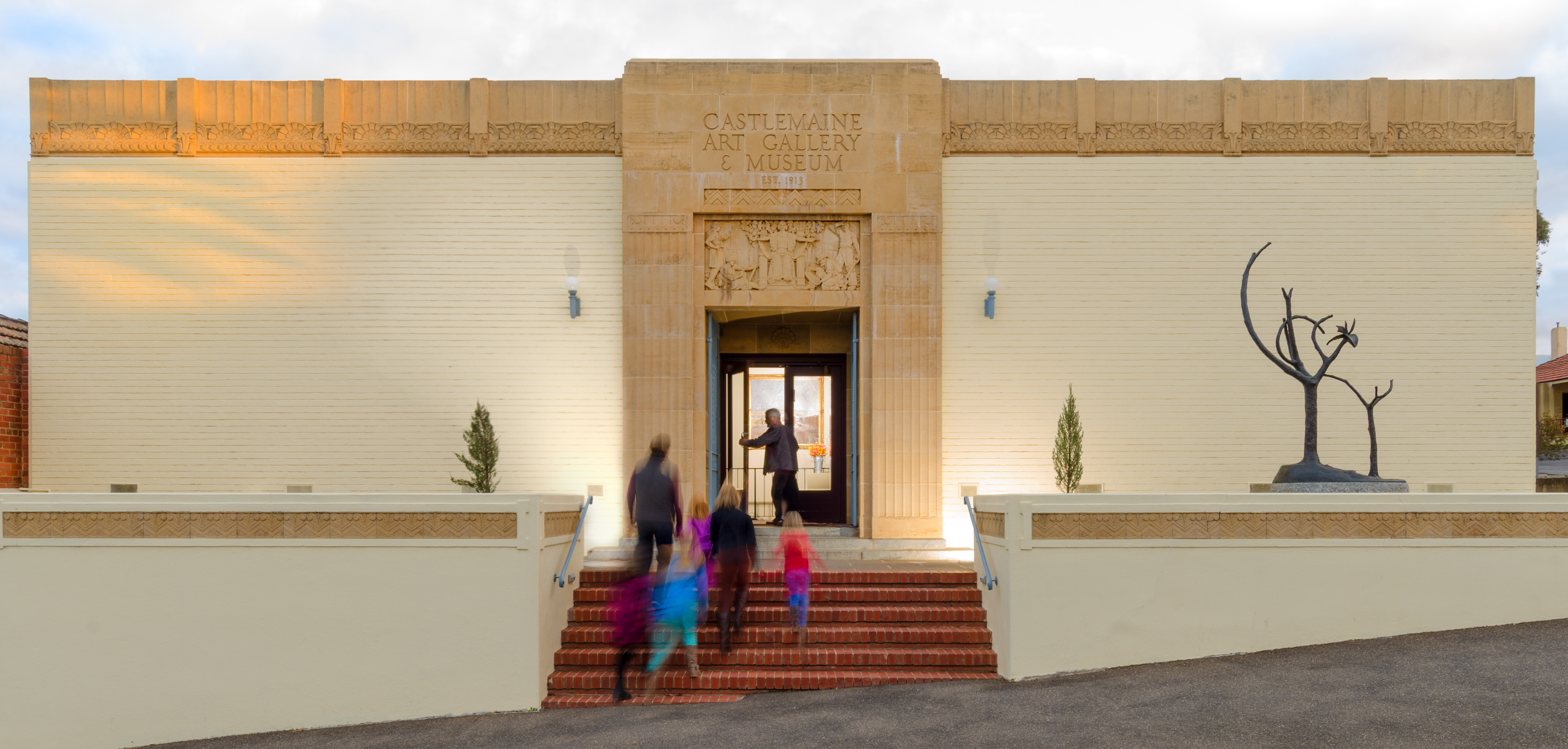
- 1931 Art Deco facade of the Castlemaine Art Museum photographed in 2017

- Location within Victoria
- Former name: Castlemaine Art Gallery and Historical Museum
- Established: 9 July 1913
- Location: 12–14 Lyttleton Street, Castlemaine
- Coordinates: 37.0647°S 144.2138°E
- Type: Art gallery and historical museum
- Accreditation: Australian Museums and Galleries Association
- Key holdings: Frederick McCubbin, Heath Paddock, Hawthorn 1886 & Golden Sunlight 1914; Tom Roberts, Reconciliation 1886–87; E. Phillips Fox, Bathing Hour c.1909; Dora Meeson, In a Chelsea Garden c.1912–1917; Penleigh Boyd, Winter Calm, Frankston 1920; Russell Drysdale, Desolation 1945
- Collections: Tonal Realism; Bookplates; Black and White Illustration; Women Artists; Modernist Prints; Enamelwork; Castlemaine History, Places and People; Portrait photographs of artists
- Collection size: 2,000+ artworks and 4000+ historical artefacts
- Visitors: 12,776 (2024–2025)
- Founder: Anna Mary Winifred Brotherton (1874–1956)
- CEO: Leslie Gurusinghe
- Chairperson: Mark Sheppard (Chair)
- Curator: Jennifer Long (Honorary)
- Architect: Percy Meldrum
- Historians: Peter Perry, David J. Golightly
- Owners: Castlemaine Art Gallery and Historical Museum Trust
- Employees: 2.6 FTE (2023–24), 16 volunteers
- Public transit access: VLine Melbourne–Bendigo–Swan Hill Line, Castlemaine Railway Station, 300m
- Parking: Lyttleton Street
- Website: https://castlemaineartmuseum.org.au

Castlemaine Art Museum is an art gallery and museum in Castlemaine, Victoria, Australia. Founded in 1913, it is housed in a purpose-built Art Deco building, completed in 1931 and heritage-listed by the National Trust. Its collection concentrates on Australian art and the museum houses historical artefacts and displays drawn from the local district.

The museum is governed by private trustees and managed by a board elected by subscribers. It is funded by state and local governments with additional support from benefactors, local families, artists and patrons. Its trustees also oversee the management of Buda, a heritage-listed villa and garden 1.3 km adjacent to the museum, which houses its own collection of art and artefacts associated with the Leviny family, and is also open to the public for exhibitions, events displays and garden tours.

== History ==
The founding of Castlemaine Art Gallery and Historical Museum was preceded by four other public regional galleries in the state of Victoria: Ballarat in 1884, Warrnambool in 1886, Bendigo in 1887 and Geelong in 1900, but its significance, by comparison, was that it was in a small town, not a regional city like its forebears.

Local cultural precedents were the 1855 Castlemaine Mechanics Institute which included a library; the School of Mines whose art teacher C. Steiner in 1908 taught engineering, surveying, architecture and fine art students; and numbers of artists, including S. T. Gill, Samuel Calvert, George French Angas, and early photographers Antoine Fauchery and Richard Daintree, had visited to document the swarming goldfields.

=== Castlemaine Past and Present ===
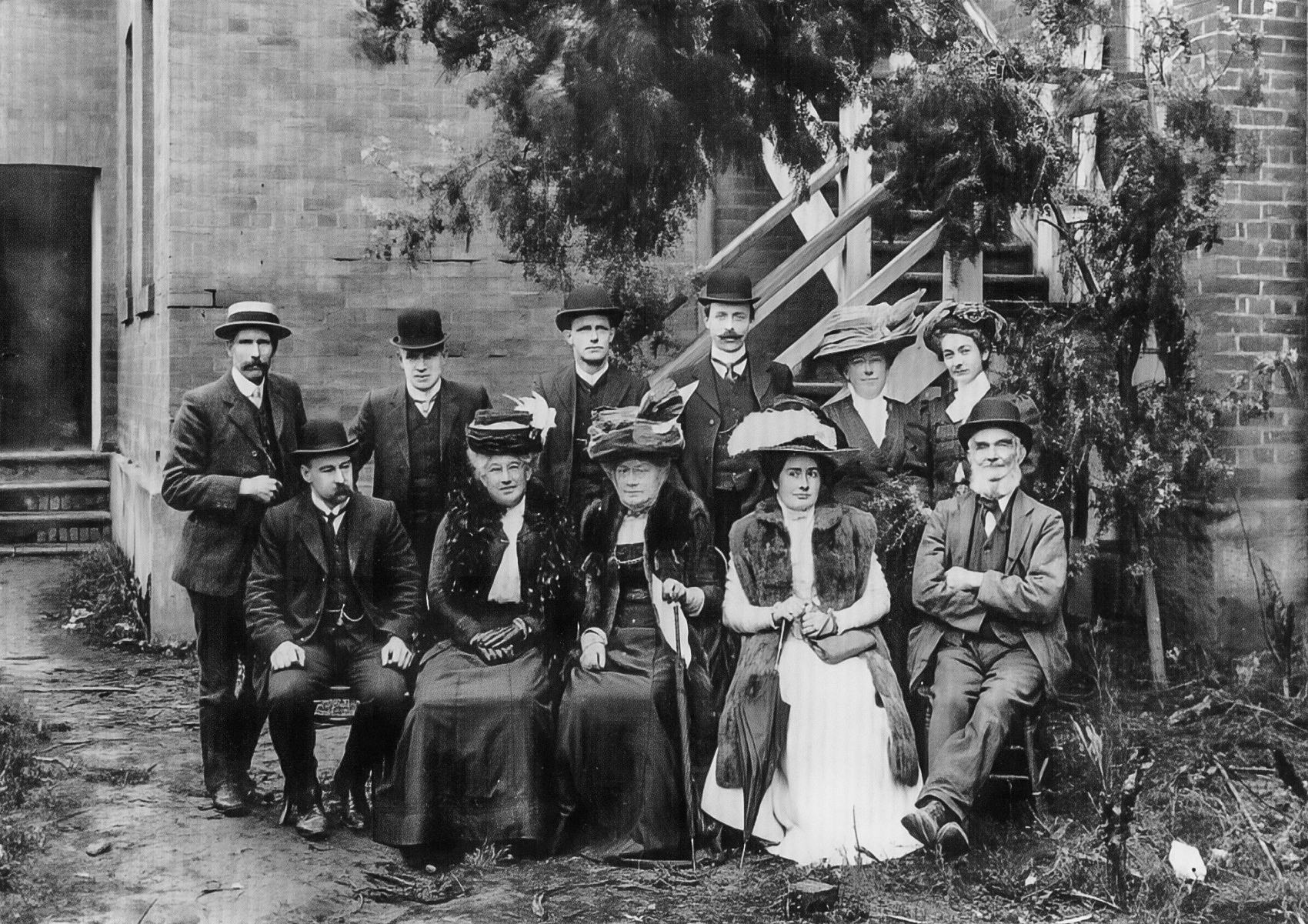
Unknown photographer (c.1910) Castlemaine Progress Association, organisers of Castlemaine Past and Present Exhibition and initiators of the Castlemaine Art Gallery and Historical Museum. Back row L-R: Walter J. Whitchell, Frank R. Cocking, Alf. C. Pensom (President), Mr N Hayes, Mary Leviny, Winifred Brotherton.Front L–R: Lieut. Col. Francis S Newell, Lucy Philpots, Mary B. Woolley, Alice Newell, Charles Mapperson.

The Castlemaine Progress Association's display of items of a 'novel and interesting nature', Castlemaine Past and Present, the town's first major exhibition, running 18–20 August 1910, celebrated the commercial, civic and cultural achievements of the town with "a collection of geological specimens and curios from the Government collection," photographs of historical interest, maps, furniture, applied art, books and artefacts, as well as landscapes by local artists intended to "popularise our town as a resort for artists and painters". Featured in the exhibition was a sculptural representation, over 5 metres high, of the 240 tonnes of gold which had been extracted from the surrounding goldfields.

The committee included a "special feature" of "modern art, the only stipulation being that works of art, as well as all other exhibits, must relate in some way to Castlemaine or its district," and called for "historical curios, weapons, maps, manuscripts, medals, trophies, or any other article of local significance". An early supporter was Elioth Gruner. The exhibition thus established the principle of collecting of Australian art and of looking locally, for works connected to Castlemaine in some aspect, in contrast to a policy of concentrating on British and European art that was pursued by most Australian galleries of the period, in particular the National Gallery of Victoria purchases in Europe by L. Bernard Hall through the Felton Bequest.

=== Public meeting ===
Two years later, in October 1912, the first solo exhibition of paintings by a local resident, Elsie Barlow, wife of a Castlemaine police magistrate, was held in the reading room of the Mechanics Institute, raising hopes "that the Castlemaine public will have the same opportunity in this matter as is afforded to the Melbourne public, which now-a-days is rarely without an Art Exhibition".

Subsequently, a meeting at Barlow's Hunter Street home on 9 July 1913 proposed the creation of a permanent gallery for Castlemaine and approached the Mayor to "affirm the advisability of establishing a Museum and Art Gallery in Castlemaine" on 30 July at a public meeting of Mayors and Councillors from Chewton, Maldon, Metcalfe, Newstead and Mount Alexander with Col. Davies, Secretary of the Bendigo Art Gallery, Mr A T Woodward Director of the Bendigo School of Arts, Mr Bernard Hall, Director of the National Gallery of Victoria, Trustees of the National Gallery and Museum and the Old Pioneers Association, and with support of the local High School committee.

Winifred Brotherton, who took the minutes, emphasised the imperative of establishing a museum in which to preserve the heritage of the town, and the museum was later to be given her name in her honour.

Colonel Davis spoke from the experience of Bendigo Art Gallery where he was secretary, advising not to expect government funds such as they had received as the grant was only £2,000 to be divided amongst all the arts organisations, but to secure donations of pictures, be prepared to go into debt, and make use of loans from the National Gallery of Victoria. The housing of the gallery was considered and proposals included the cooking classroom of the Technical High School, the Market Building, the Town Hall, and the School of Mines.

=== Realisation ===
The gallery became a reality when Bertha Leviny of Buda homestead provided use of a room in a shop in Lyttleton St. for one year free of charge. Bendigo Art Gallery offered a loan of paintings. A loan exhibition of 30 works in the Stock Exchange Room of the Town Hall launched the Castlemaine Art Gallery and Historical Museum on 24 October 1913, its first office bearers being Mary Leviny, Lilian Sheridan, Alice Waterhouse and her husband (President), Winifred Brotherton, Elsie Barlow, Mary Brough Woolley and Mrs. Cox. Significant exhibitors who made donations of their work included Harold Herbert and Jessie Traill.

When the gallery moved into the room offered by Leviny in Lyttleton St., more donations were made. Bertha Merfield made generous loans of works from her collection to its inaugural exhibition, including paintings by Tudor St George Tucker, Alexander Colquhoun, George Clausen, Frederick McCubbin and Blamire Young. joined by direct loans by artists, and by the National Gallery of Victoria which contributed Franz Courtens' Morning, David Wynfield's Death of the Duke of Buckingham, Robert Dowling's Sheikh and His Son Entering Cairo; Hermann Eschke's Freshwater Bay, Isle of Wight; Cave Thomas' Canute Listening to the Monks at Ely; and Louis Buvelot's Summer afternoon, Templestowe.

The 1914 annual report recorded 30 memberships and a collection of 23 pictures with others on loan and a balance of £75. Initial opening hours in 1914 were daily from 3 to 5 p.m., and Wednesday and Saturday evenings from 7.30 to 9.30, changed later to weekdays 10 am to 12 pm and 2 to 5 pm, and Sundays 2 to 5 pm.

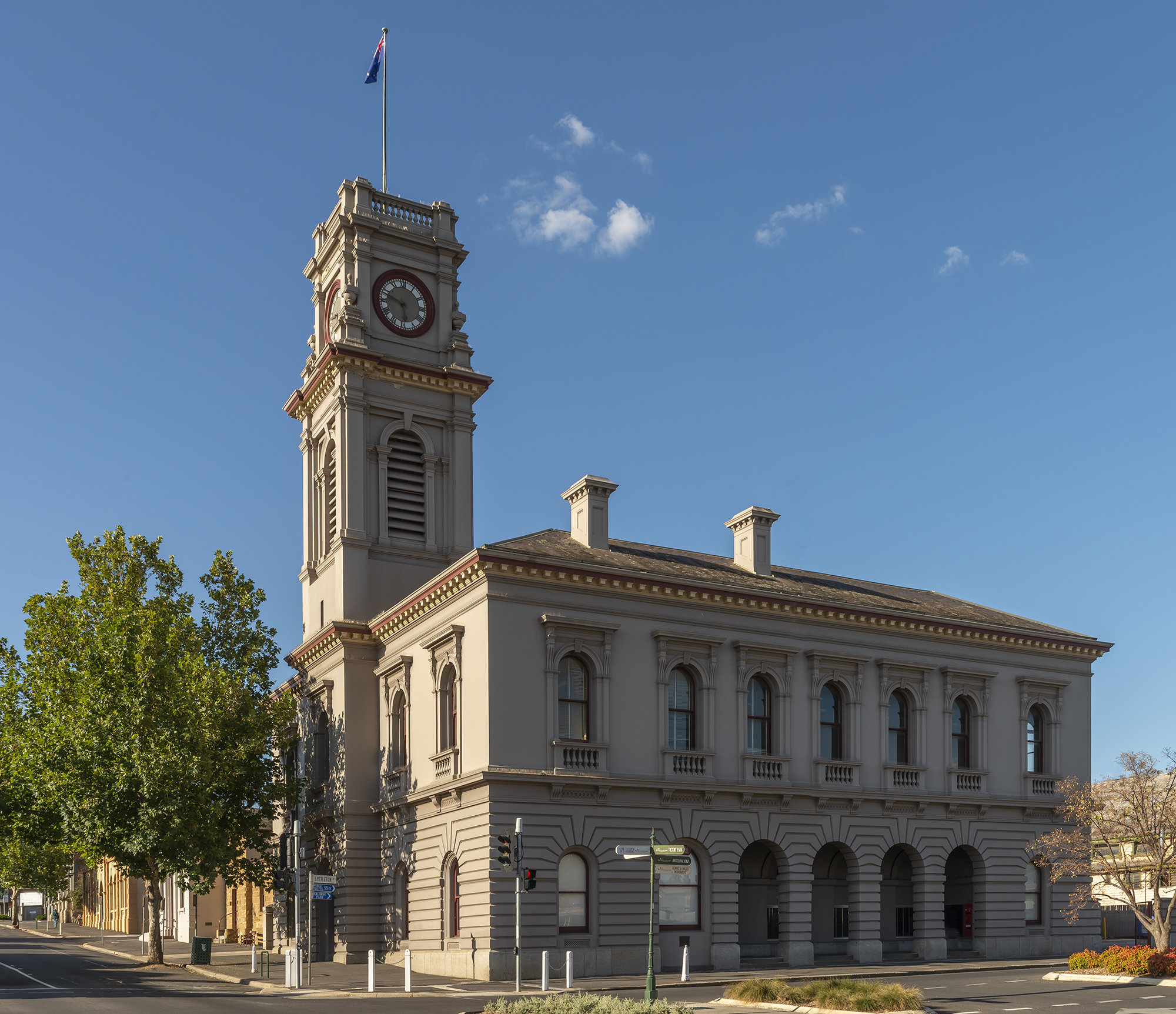
Castlemaine Post Office

The next home of the gallery and museum, by June 1915, was in the rooms above the Castlemaine Post Office which it rented for £1 per annum, and where it remained until 1931 in three well-lit rooms: two small ones, and one measuring 9 by 5.5 metres (30 by 18 ft) which served as the main gallery. Nevertheless, the Victorian Government rejected their grant application of 1915 because the Gallery's tenure of its premises was not secure. Electric lighting was added in 1927.

The facility proved popular, with attendances rising from 800 in 1920 to 3,600 in 1923. Many in 1928 came for a series of talks by John Shirlow intended to boost interest in the Gallery. Artists too were noticing it, as The Age reported in November 1923;

'Tis said that the reputation of this gallery is such that every artist of note throughout Australia has heard of the little gallery which so cherishes and encourages the work of Australian men and women that a renaissance of effort has been brought about among Australian painters.

The insurance value of the collection rose in 1925 to £2,000 (a value of $190,800.00 in 2024), with a further 37 paintings gifted in 1926 by, among others, Arthur Streeton, George Coates, Dora Meeson, Jo Sweatman, and A.M.E. Bale, etchings by Martin Lewis, and purchases including The Dark Horse by George W. Lambert, and The Coming Storm by Blamire Young, as reported by Lieut. Col. Francis S. Newell, then President of the Castlemaine Art Gallery in Art in Australia of December 1926. Newell also commented on attendance by 5,248 visitors; "When it is remembered that the population of this town is about 7,000, the progress of this gallery is remarkable. The committee has now purchased a site for a new building, but more funds are needed before the project can be carried out."

== Building ==
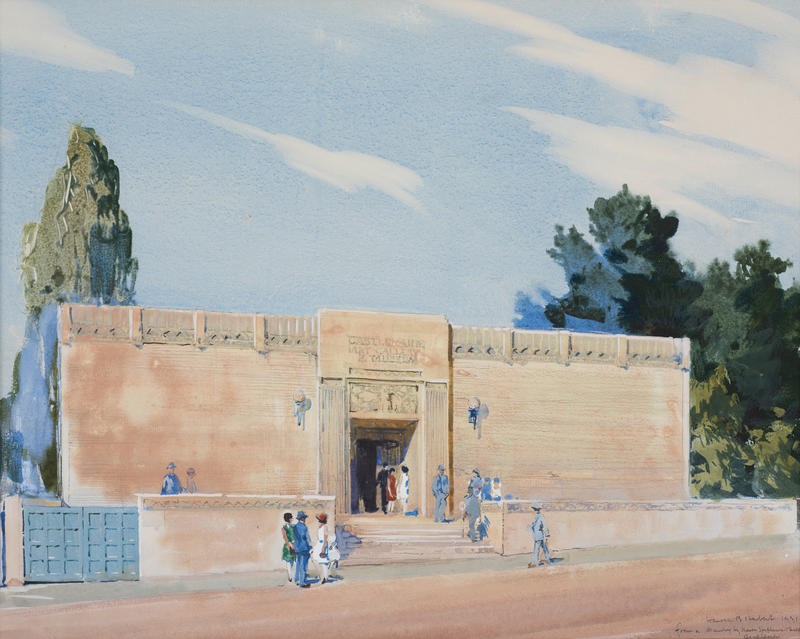
Harold Herbert, Castlemaine Art Gallery and Museum, 1931

Since 17 November 1983 Castlemaine Art Museum is classified by The National Trust (revised 3 August 1998), which notes its significance as;

… an exceptional building in its intent and execution and … historically important as one of the earliest examples of the "modern movement" in provincial Victoria.

A building fund was set up in 1923 using a donation of £100 by Sir John and Lady Higgins. A site in Templeton Street was purchased for £1200 but later sold to acquire the present block in Lyttleton Street in 1927 for about £300. That year in a visit to Castlemaine the Hon George Prendergast enabled a deputation to seek a grant to augment the building fund, to which he offered £1000 on the basis of £1 for every £2 raised locally. Walter J. Whitchell promised £500 for the building fund should the balance be found when the fund held only £760. With the building costed at £3,500, an appeal for funds from the public was launched. Despite the onset of the Depression, £3,250 was raised in only six weeks from private individuals and companies the Bank of Australasia, Ball & Welch and Bryant & May, augmented by the promised State government grant of £1,000, and afterward a further £500. With furnishings, the total cost was £4,132 (worth $610,600.00 in 2024).

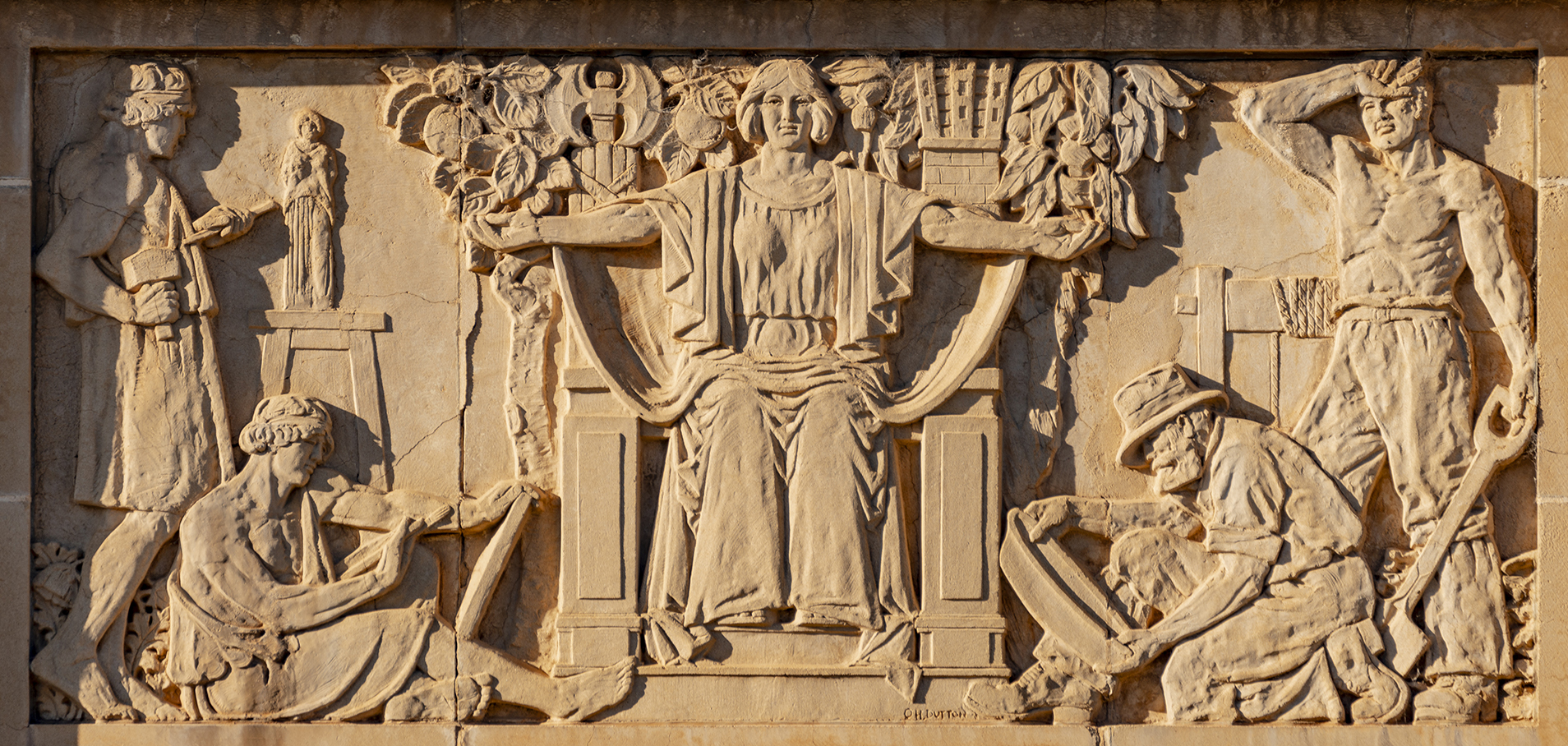
Allegorical bas-relief showing guardian goddess embodying Castlemaine, artists and miners, designed by Orlando Dutton, 1930

Architect Percy Meldrum, who trained in the United States presented to a reluctant management committee a "modern and artistic" design for the Castlemaine Art Gallery and Historical Museum (as it was then named) in an American Art-deco style. The main gallery walls and those of both additional gallery spaces were naturally and indirectly lit from the concealed windows of a saw-tooth roof above suspended ceilings.

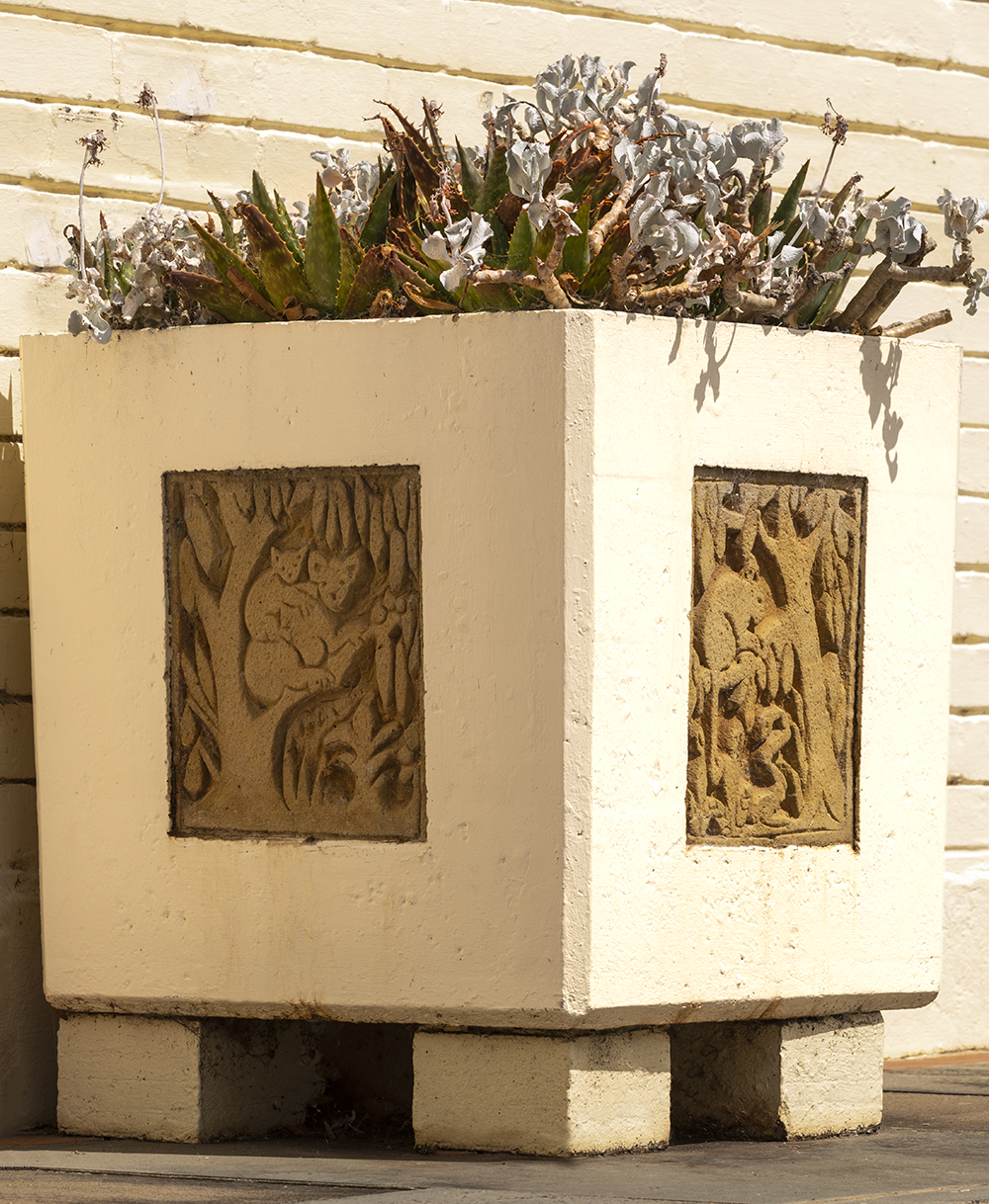
Michael O'Connell (1931) Concrete and artificial stone planter

The entry steps are Harcourt granite, the parapet of Malmsbury bluestone, and Barker's Creek slate pave the forecourt, on which rest two cuboid planters decorated with panels showing native animals in a sympathetic style by textile artist and sculptor Michael O’Connell who also provided planters and ornaments to Buda's garden.

A "Jazz" style frieze that combines Egyptian and Central American motifs and fluting decorates the parapet, front wall and tympanum over the central front door, itself recessed behind ornate wrought-iron grille gates. The symmetrical facade includes a bas-relief in artificial stone featuring a female figure that symbolises Castlemaine surrounded, on the right, by two attendant gold-miners of the past, and artist and sculptor at left. It was designed and carved by Orlando H. Dutton (1894-1962), an English-born artist working in Australia after 1920.

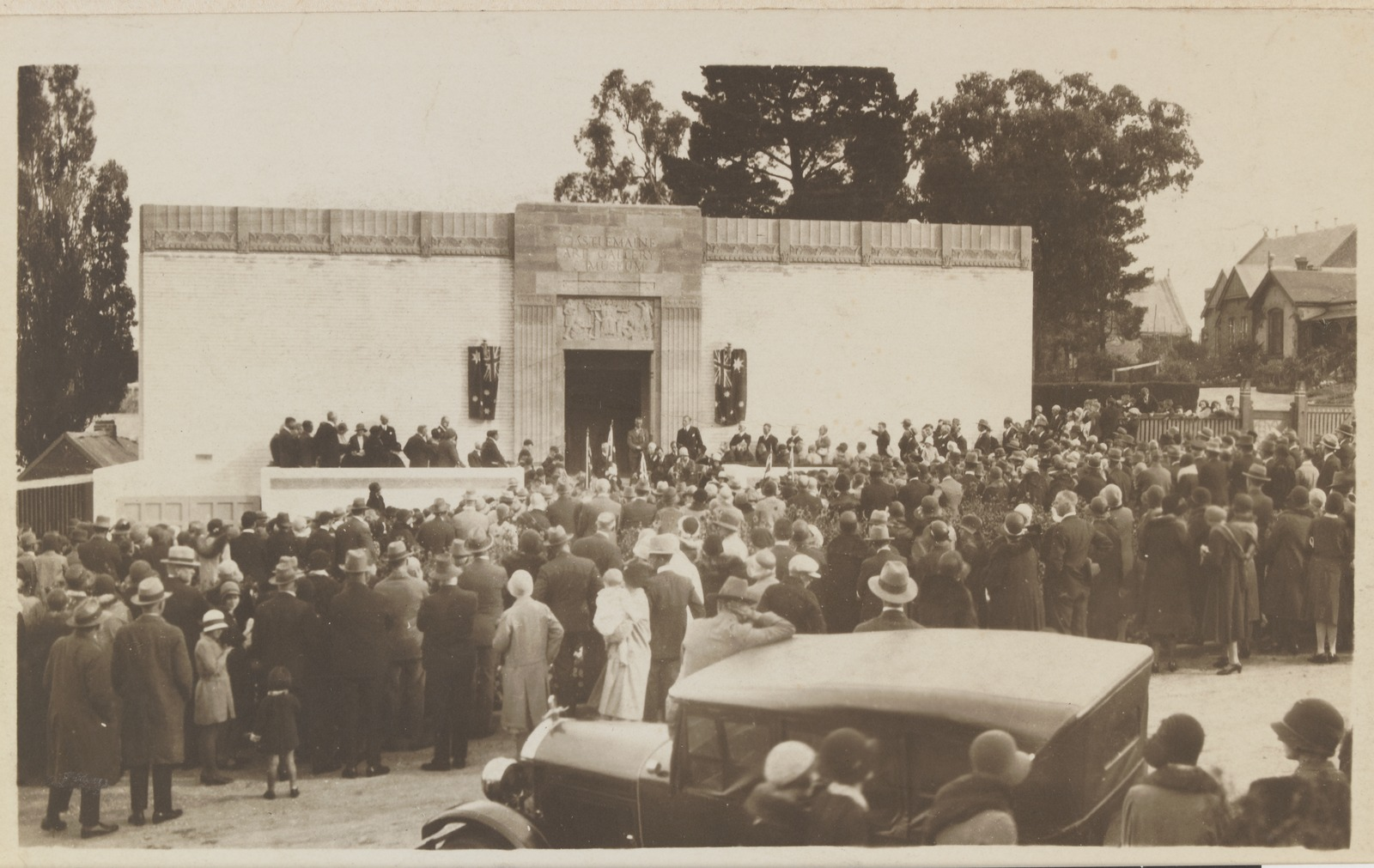
Opening of the Castlemaine Art Gallery and Historical Museum in 1931

Builder Frank Pollard completed construction between June 1930 and April 1931 for the Gallery and Museum's official opening, free of debt, It consisted of a main gallery 19.5 by 7.3 metres (64 by 24 ft) for the display of oil paintings, behind two smaller galleries for prints and water-colours flanking the entry, each approximately 7 by 6 metres (23 by 20 ft) and with the museum in the basement with storerooms. As commemorated at the entrance on a copper plaque by Stanley J. Ellis, instructor at the Castlemaine Technical School, the Governor of Victoria Lord Somers conducted the opening ceremony on 18 April 1931 in front of a crowd at the entrance to the Gallery that flowed across the street. It was reported as far away as Canada that;

In opening the art gallery, in the presence of a very large gathering, Lord Somers said that he had been amazed at seeing a gallery and a collection so fine. He did not suppose that a gallery of those dimensions would be found in a town of that size anywhere else in the British Dominions. Extraordinary enthusiasm must have been shown to make the gallery possible.

Visitor numbers during 1933 increased to 10,000.

P. S. Markham and Professor Henry C. Richards, touring Australia on behalf of the Carnegie Corporation of New York, reported that the Gallery was "a credit to all concerned ... After Port Sunlight, where Lord Lever's art collection is housed, this small town has probably a better art gallery than any comparable town in the British Empire."

=== Additions ===
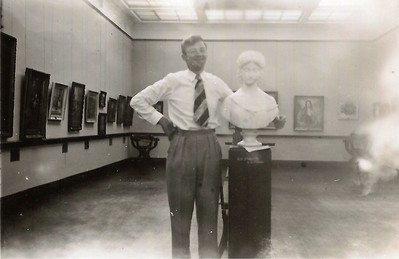
Permanent collection on display in the Whitchell gallery, c. 1950, with Lucca Flaminio's sculpture La Puberta (1866)

By 1938 space proved insufficient for special exhibitions and to accommodate the program of public galleries lending artworks and circulating exhibitions amongst them. At Castlemaine that necessitated dismounting the existing collection and storing while a temporary exhibition was on display. The burgeoning collection posed storage problems; in 1942 Sir John Higgins' bequest of his pictures, china, glassware and furniture, could not be housed and the committee was forced to make plans for extensions to be part-funded by his sister Catherine's bequest of £8,300. However, it was not spent due to war and post-war impediments to building.

=== 1960 ===
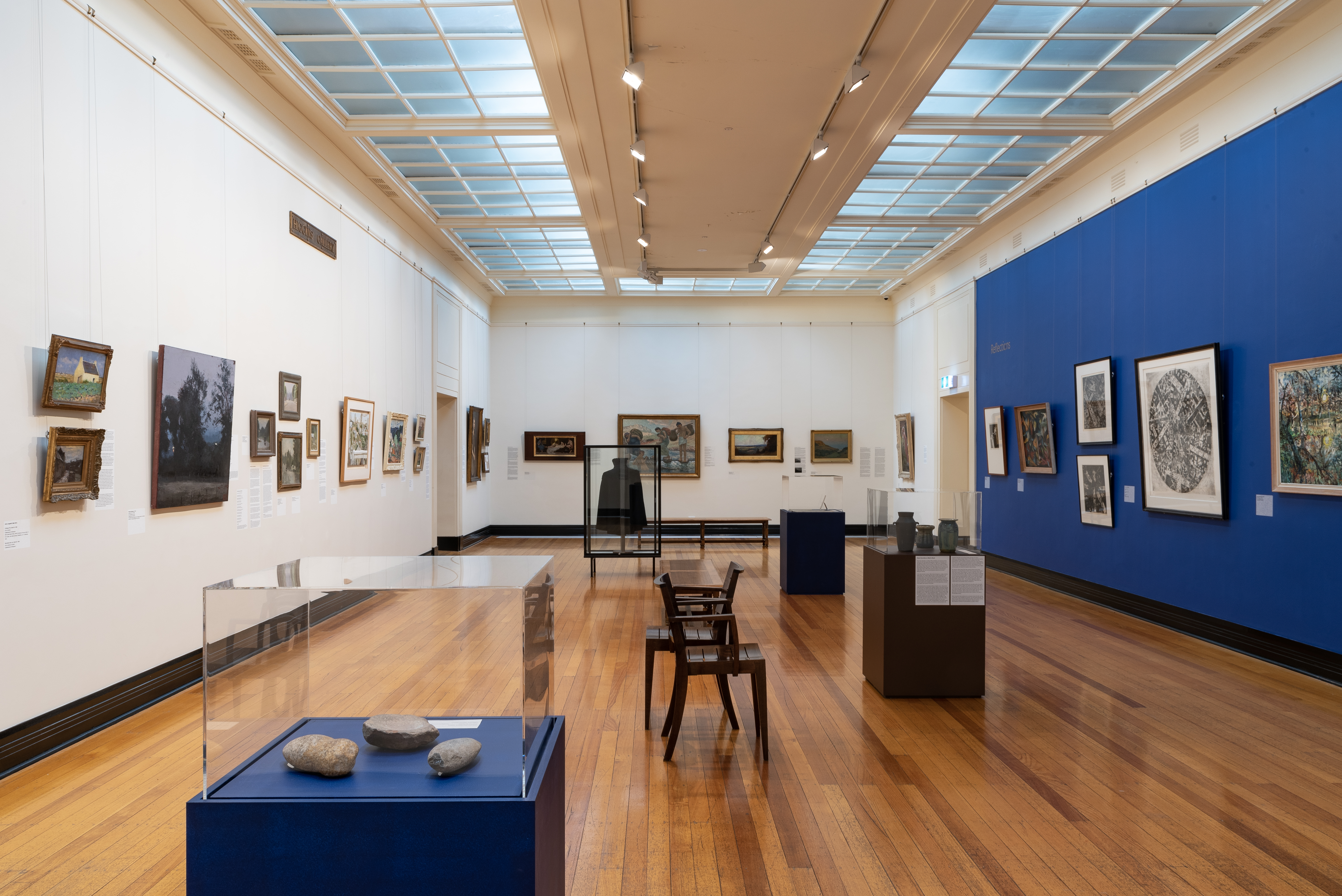
Castlemaine Art Museum's Higgins Gallery, view to East, during exhibition Reflections 2023

Impetus for a new extension did not gather until 1956, when the possibility of an internal paved courtyard for sculpture was considered. But only in 1959 was a decision reached to complete the project though the cost had risen to £16,000, beyond the means of the Gallery. The Bolte ministry promised a subsidy on a pound for pound basis and in late 1960 the adjacent Presbyterian Church donated a strip of land for driveway access to the rear of the building, enabling work to commence. The resulting Higgins Gallery was opened on 23 September 1961, by Dr Leonard Cox, Chairman of Trustees of the National Gallery of Victoria, and it included storerooms, work areas, and shelving and sliding racks for storage of artworks.

=== 1973 ===
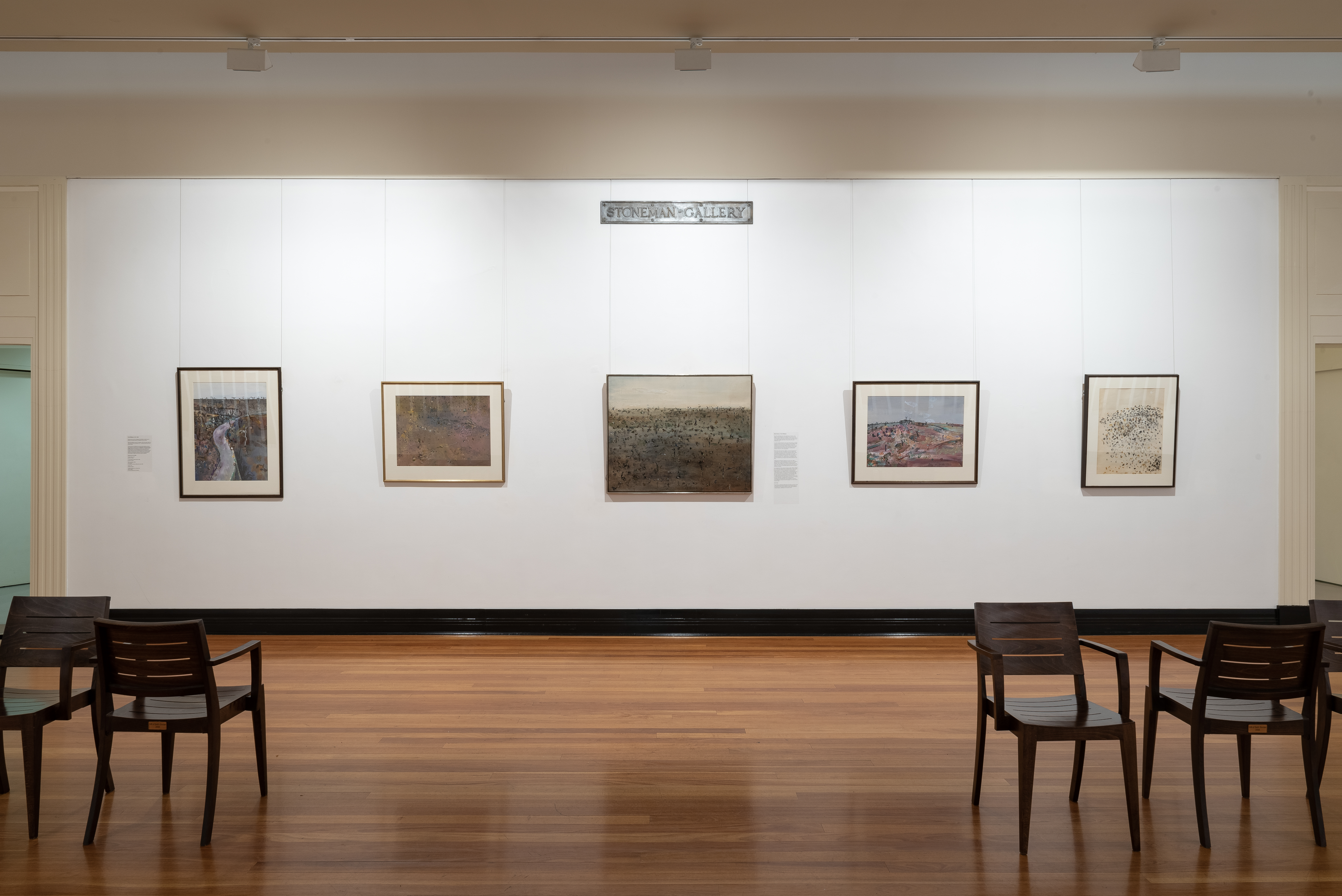
Castlemaine Art Museum's Stoneman Gallery in 2023 with works on paper by Fred Williams

A third space for special and temporary exhibitions was funded by a gift of $12,500 from the Stoneman Foundation after which it is named, and a State Government grant of $26,000 and was opened by Premier Rupert Hamer on 14 September 1973, on the occasion of the Gallery's sixtieth anniversary.

=== 1987 ===
Renovations and additions completed since include a storeroom and workspace areas, added in 1987 and named the A & B Sinclair Building Extensions, after inaugural Director Beth Sinclair and her husband, and were opened by the Hon Race Matthews MLA, Minister for the Arts. This renovation included an extension to the Museum below, named the Percy Chaster Building for his bequest to the gallery.

=== 2000 ===
Grants from the Department of Communication, Technology and the Arts were distributed by the Federal government for the Centenary of Federation in 1999, denounced by some commentators as pork-barrelling, from which Castlemaine Art Gallery and Historical Museum received $2,000,000 for upgrades and redevelopment by architect Allom Lovell. The 1973 addition at the rear of the building was gutted and turned into the temporary exhibitions gallery with international museum standard climate and lighting controls, and security systems enabling Castlemaine to borrow major national and international works and travelling exhibitions. The high vaulted ceiling naturally lit via UV-filtered skylights has a hidden shutter system to permit blacking out for exhibitions that require artificial lighting only. An artificially lit small prints and drawings gallery is, since 2020, set aside for CAM's Orbit program; a series of exhibitions by artists who live and work in Central Victoria. Other works included a conservation studio for the treatment and restoration of works of art and historical documents, renovation of the Gallery and Museum shop, and a substantial mezzanine at the rear of the building for new offices, and a research library, the latter named after A. G. Lloyd-Stephenson whose bequest added substantially to its collection of art books. During these year-long renovations, the Gallery and Museum were temporarily relocated to the Gallery's old quarters above the Post Office. Completed in late 2000, the extensions were opened on 6 October by the Hon Peter McGauran, Federal Minister for the Arts and Centenary of Federation.

=== Forming the collection ===
==== Policy ====
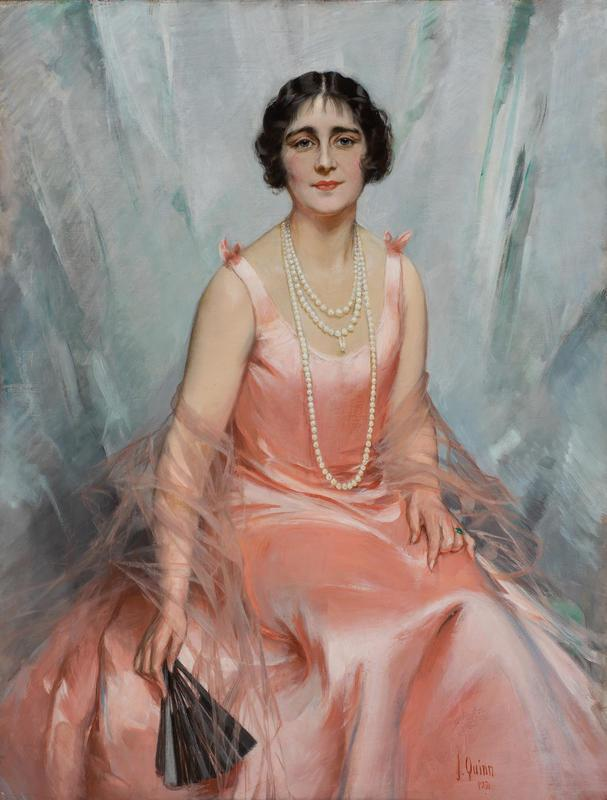
James Quinn, Portrait of the Duchess of York, 1931

While its building was assertively Modern, attitudes prevailing during the 1930s and 1940s meant that the collection of works within remained conservative. One artist, and one of the wealthiest, associated with the Gallery, A.M.E. Bale was vehement in her distaste for anything 'modern,' echoing the views of then National Gallery of Victoria director James Stuart MacDonald who, of the 1939 Herald exhibition of contemporary French and English painting sponsored by Sir Keith Murdoch, proclaimed, 'They are exceedingly wretched paintings ... putrid meat ... the product of degenerates and perverts ... filth'.

A demonstration of these conservative values was the Gallery's 1931 commissioning of James Quinn's painting of the Duchess of York, then in 1933 to have painter W B Mclnnes travel to England to portray the Duke of York (later King George VI). Numbers of 20th-century artists represented were members of the conservative, anti-modernist Australian Academy of Art (1937–1946), while others joined its rival the Contemporary Art Society.

It was not until 1946 with the purchase for 175 guineas (A$13,000 in 2020) of Desolation, painted the same year by Russell Drysdale, a dark expressionist work, that this attitude changed. When added to existing holdings of 105 oils, 57 water colours and 76 etchings, drawings and prints, the purchase was welcomed by Clive Turnbull, since 1942 the Murdoch-appointed art critic at the Herald, who considered the cost ...

... a good price by any Australian standards. The gallery's committee has shown its enterprlse and the courage of its convictions in buying what ranks as a "modern" work. "Desolation," as this large oil is called, is one of the series painted by Russell Drysdale — in some peoples' view the most significant of all contemporary Australian artists — after his visit to the erosion country of New South Wales last year. In rich, dark colors, it is typical and good Drysdale of this period. The foreground is dominated by a huge twisted tree form. A picture of the power and quality of this one obviously presents considerable difficulties in hanging in a small gallery it is destructive of neighboring works which are merely pretty or superficially representational, and one hardly supposes that the placing of it will be entirely satisfactory until there are enough works of kindred character and quality to keep it company [...] Castlemaine is to be congratulated on having obtalned this picture.

Even so, the purchase coincided with that of Rupert Bunny's semi-allegorical 1932 Stepping Stones, and the policy remained still to prefer figurative studies, landscape and portraiture, but to permit semi-abstract works.

Frank Fitzgerald writing in the Argus in 1947 noted the Drysdale and Bunny purchases and an increasing public interest in regional galleries, which he attributed "to the enterprise of the Castlemaine people, who within a few years have established in their town one of the best country art galleries in Australia."

==== Funding ====
Lack of funds has historically handicapped the Gallery's acquisitions of significant works of art. In 1916 an annual state government grant of a mere £30 ($2,836.00 value in 2020) was " ... to be spent on pictures, and pictures only". By 1937 this had been raised to £100, with the municipality contributing only £6. After WWI it survived on subscribers, door takings and a government grant of £20 per annum, and finances were particularly strained when it had found a permanent home during a period coinciding with the Great Depression, when all government funding was withdrawn until 1935.

Nevertheless, bequests were forthcoming, such as that for the portrait of Edna Thomas, by John Longstaff, funded from the will of F. McKillop, editor of the Castlemaine Mail. The gallery relied also on direct donations of works, by artists such as Elioth Gruner who gave his In the Orchard, in 1920; in 1936 James Quinn donated two female studies; and in 1930 Tom Roberts gifted a late landscape, Wayside, Kallista and Reconciliation, companion to his A Summer Morning Tiff at Ballarat, writing:

‘Talisman’, Kallista Vic. Apr 16/30. Dear Mr Brent Clark–Thanks for the catalogue & all good fortune to your gallery...Now here’s a suggestion for you to think on. I have just bought back a painting done at Box Hill a while ago & I don’t want to offer it for sale; and it is too big for our bungalow house. It’s ‘Reconciliation’ & above 5 ft high. You and your committee might have to have a look at it. It’s at Gill’s, 100 Exhibition St and it’s for your gallery if you wish to have it—with my best wishes. With all compliments and congratulations on your good progress, Faithfully Yours, Tom Roberts".

Billy McInnes's large canvas Ploughing and etchings by Norman Lindsay was given by Sir Baldwin Spencer, and Dame Nellie Melba's made gifts of a portrait of her father David Mitchell by Hugh Ramsey and Frederick McCubbin's Golden Sunlight. The Argus reported in 1937 that "through Mr Max Meldrum, the Castlemaine Art Gallery has received five pictures, three by Miss Clarice Beckett, one by A. C. Colquhoun, and one by Max Meldrum, while Rupert Bunny has given a picture which he formerly had in the Sydney Art Gallery." Locals contributed to special subscription funds in order to secure desirable works unlikely to be donated, as they did in 1925 for Charles Wheeler's The Last Ray.

Other works have been acquired by exchange; for example The Australian War Memorial's provision of duplicates of two Will Dyson lithographs in return for an Eric Kennington portrait of Hughie Edwards, the highly decorated Second World War airman. The Australian Government's Taxation Incentives for the Arts Scheme provided for other donations.

In 1980, former Director Perry wrote in complaint to James Mollison of the National Gallery of Australia objecting to one of its purchases at auction when both galleries were the only bidders beyond $11,000 for Margaret Preston's 1925 Still Life, which went to Canberra for a record price of $17,000. Perry felt the richer national gallery should have withdrawn to let the work through to a less prosperous smaller institution.

Government funding tended to be piecemeal; deputations to MPs during the war years and another during the Depression received minor dispensation. Formed in 1957, the Victorian Public Galleries Group on 12 March that year, held the Provincial Galleries Conference at which all the galleries lobbied Victorian Chief Secretary Arthur Rylah for an increase in government grants (then £150–350 per annum) to at least a thousand pounds per gallery.

$319 from the Australia Council in 1985 was given for "purchase of crafts for public display and permanent collection", and in 1987 Minister for the Arts, Race Mathews, announced minor capital grants including $60,000 approved to enable the Castlemaine Art Gallery to extend its storage space. The Gallery and Museum received $2,325 in 1988, and then two years later a further $6,000, from the Australia Council for the Arts Visual Arts/Crafts Board for collections development, and in 1997, part of $2.5m through the state government's Victoria Organisations Funding program, shared with seven other arts institutions.

== Collection ==
The Collections may be searched online.

=== Museum collection ===
The museum, housed in the basement, presents the history of Castlemaine and its region in objects, maps, models, diaoramas, photographs and prints, including a large group of hand-coloured lithographs from watercolours by S. T. Gill; pithy vignettes of life on the goldfields. Historical glassware and ceramics, much brought to Castlemaine by its European immigrants, extends from the Roman era. Local fauna is represented by taxidermy specimens. Items of Victorian-era fashion are also displayed, and locally-produced arts and crafts is represented in early-to-mid 20th-century enamelware and silver.

=== Gallery ===
The gallery has always specialised in Australian art as the gallery's constitution stipulated in 1913, emphasising "... the cultivation of a taste for the Fine Arts by the collection and exhibition of works of especially Australian Artists..." Accordingly, at its opening in 1931 it held 155 pictures, 26 added only the year prior, and the total predominantly Australian, and now the collection spans the periods Colonial, Impressionist, Early Twentieth Century Modernism, Mid-Century Modern, Postmodernism, and Contemporary in varieties of media.

Earlier artists include Louis Buvelot, Fred McCubbin, Tom Roberts, Arthur Streeton, Violet Teague, May Vale, Walter Withers, Ethel Spowers, David Davies, Rupert Bunny, Max Meldrum, Ethel Carrick, E. Phillips Fox, Jessie Traill, John Russell, Christian Waller, Hugh Ramsay, Clarice Beckett, A.M.E. Bale, Arthur Lindsay and John Longstaff.

Modernists include Margaret Preston, Clifford Last, Ola Cohn, Roland Wakelin, Joy Hester, Russell Drysdale, Judy Cassab, Fred Williams, Klytie Pate, John Brack, Albert Tucker, John Perceval, Clifton Pugh, Lloyd Rees, Danila Vassilieff, and Roger Kemp.

More contemporary artists include Rick Amor, Ray Crooke, Rona Green, Betty Kuntiwa Pumani, Peter Benjamin Graham, Fiona Orr, Robert Jacks, Jeffrey Smart, Diane Mantzaris, Ian Armstrong, Jenny Watson, and Brian Dunlop.

=== Indigenous art ===
First Nations art is progressively being transferred from the Museum to the walls and display cases of the Gallery, and its collection is being actively expanded. In 2019 Tiriki Onus, of Yorta Yorta and Dja Dja Wurrung heritage and University of Melbourne Associate Dean Indigenous Development and Head of the Wilin Centre for Indigenous Arts and Cultural Development, became the premier First Nations appointment to the CAM Board. The Art Museum's Strategic Plan released in 2019 and current until 2023 declares;

During the life of this Plan, CAM will consult with Traditional Owners towards increasing its engagement with and relevance for Traditional Owners and other Aboriginal and Torres Strait Islander artists and audiences.

=== Portraits of Australian artists ===
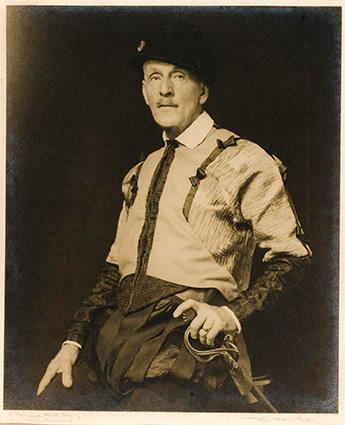
Pegg Clarke (1920s) L. Bernard Hall in his 70s, in Italian medieval costume with sword. Collection: Castlemaine Art Museum

Portraits of Australian artists by Australian photographers Max Dupain, David Moore, Richard Beck, Jack Cato, Pegg Clarke, Connie Christie, Sonia Payes, Michel Lawrence, Joyce Evans, Mina Moore, Jacqueline Mitelman and Olive Cotton and others form another specialist concentration in the collection initiated by previous Director Peter Perry.

=== Buda historic home ===
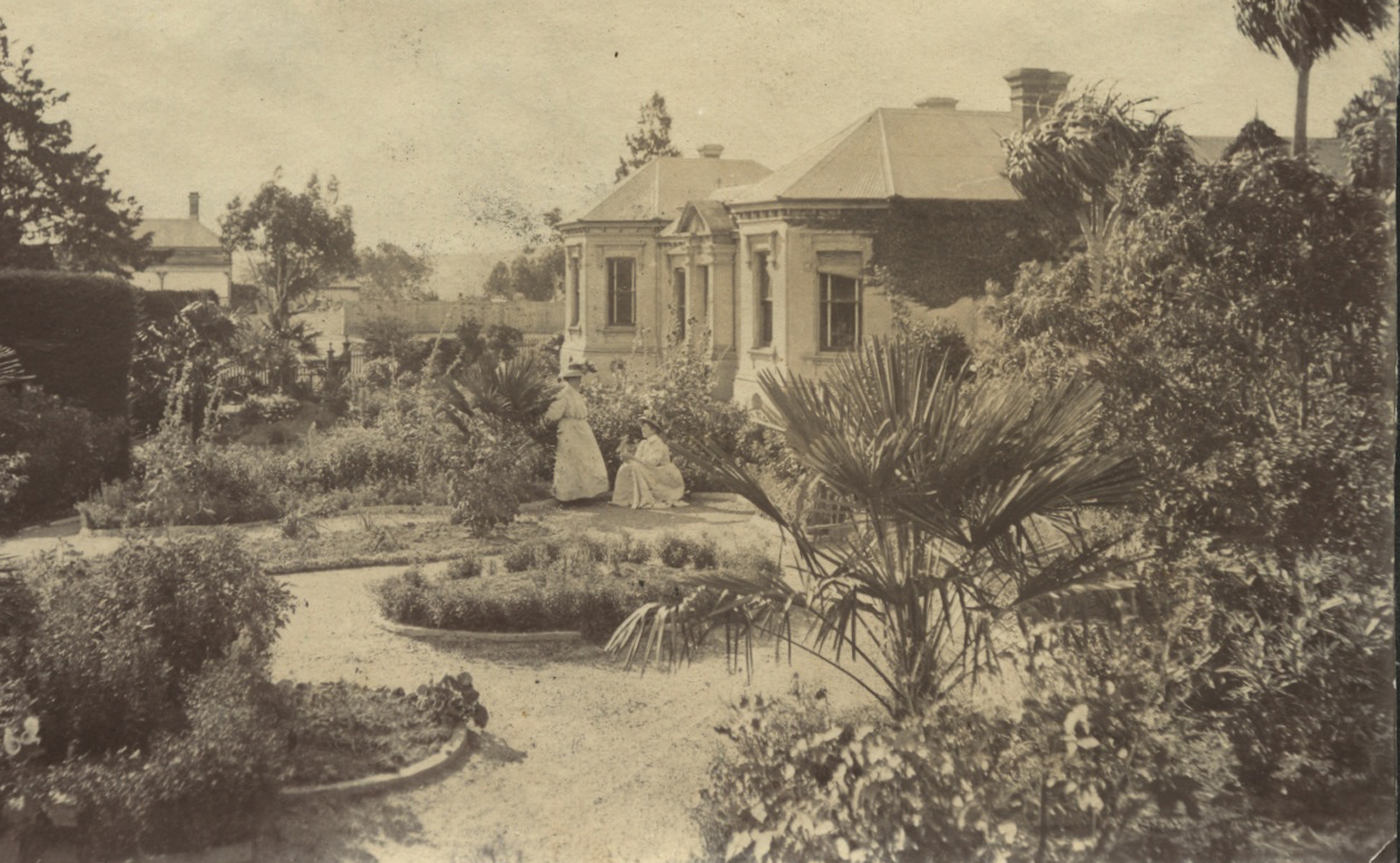
Leviny women in pre-WW1 dress, in the garden of Buda villa in Castlemaine showing its facade

Separate from the Art Museum, but under the guardianship of the trustees of the Castlemaine Art Gallery and Historical Museum (CAGHM), Buda holds on display domestic items, decorative art, furnishings, artworks, books and personal effects of the Leviny family from the 1850s up until 1981, after Hilda Leviny's death, when the home and garden were opened to the public. Clothing and accessories, documents, correspondence, diaries and photographs preserve the family's history and the eras in which they lived.

Hungarian Ernest Leviny, a practising gold- and silversmith, arrived on the Castlemaine goldfields in 1853 and the collection of his work is notable. Arts and Crafts style articles of embroidery, woodcarving and metalwork on display throughout the house and garden were produced by the Leviny daughters.

Also in the Buda collection are original artworks by mostly early twentieth century Australian artists including William Blamire-Young, Margaret Preston, Lionel Lindsay, Mildred Lovett, Ursula Ridley Walker and Alice Newell, studio pottery from the 1920s and 1930s by Klytie Pate, Philippa James and John Campbell, and hand-printed textiles of Melbourne artists Michael O’Connell, Frances Mary Burke and Lucy Newell.

=== Gallery of selected works ===
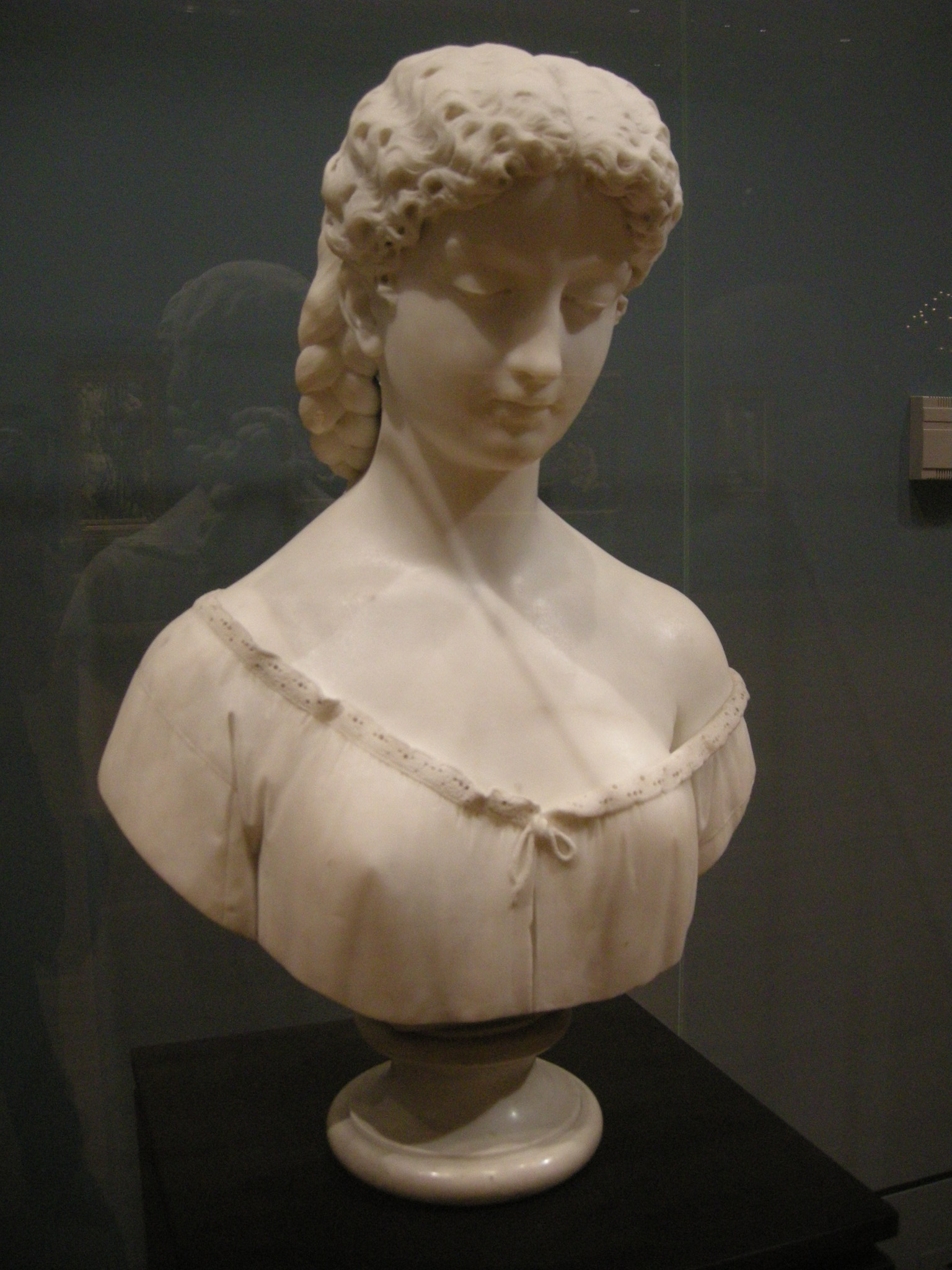
Flaminio Lucca, La pubertà, 1866

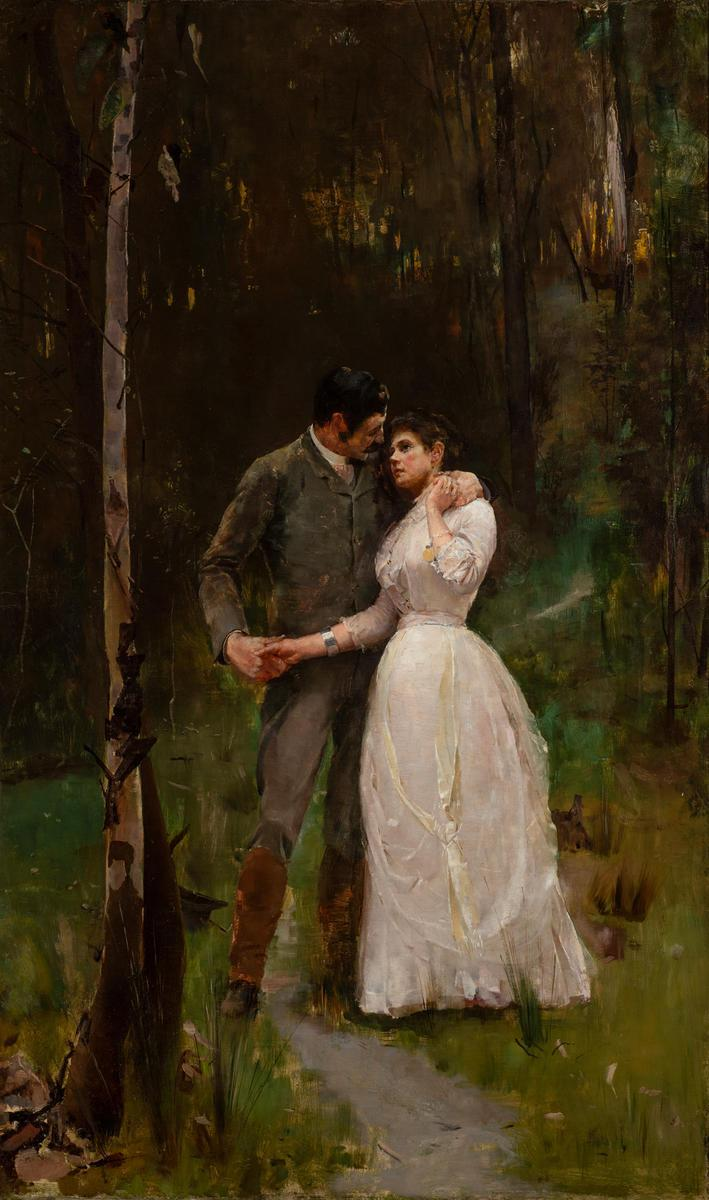
Tom Roberts, Reconciliation, 1887

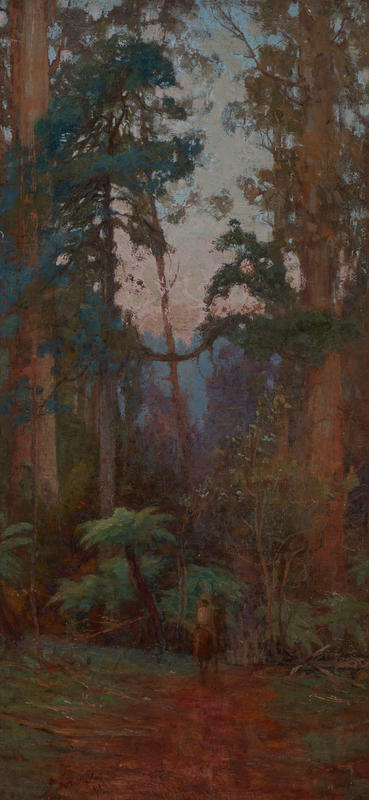
John Ford Paterson, Fernshaw, 1896

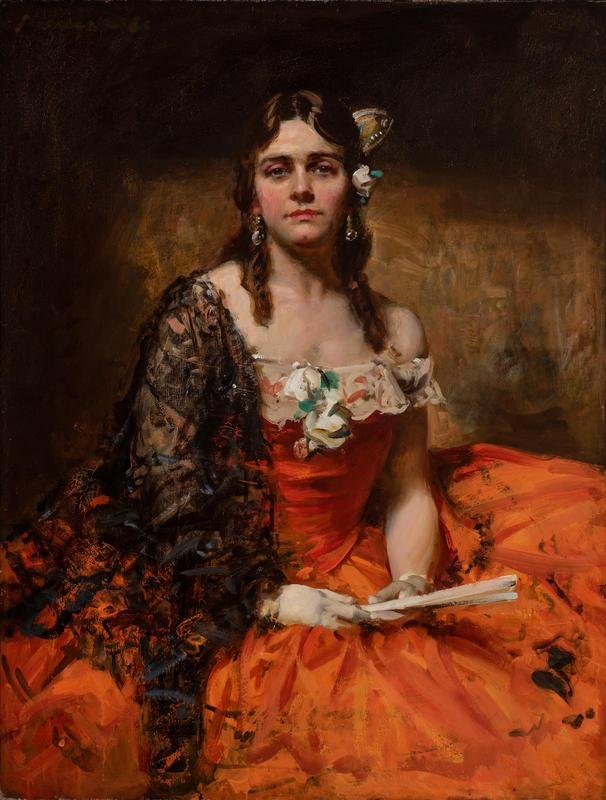
John Longstaff, Portrait of Edna Thomas, c. 1900

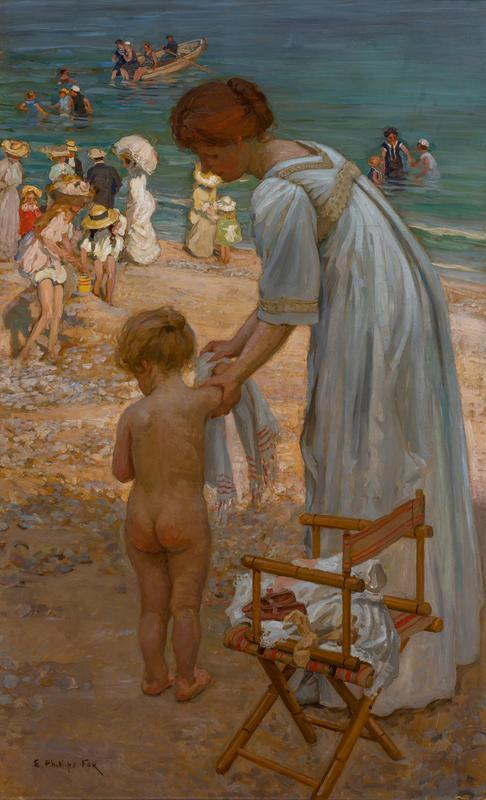
E Phillips Fox, Bathing Hour, 1909

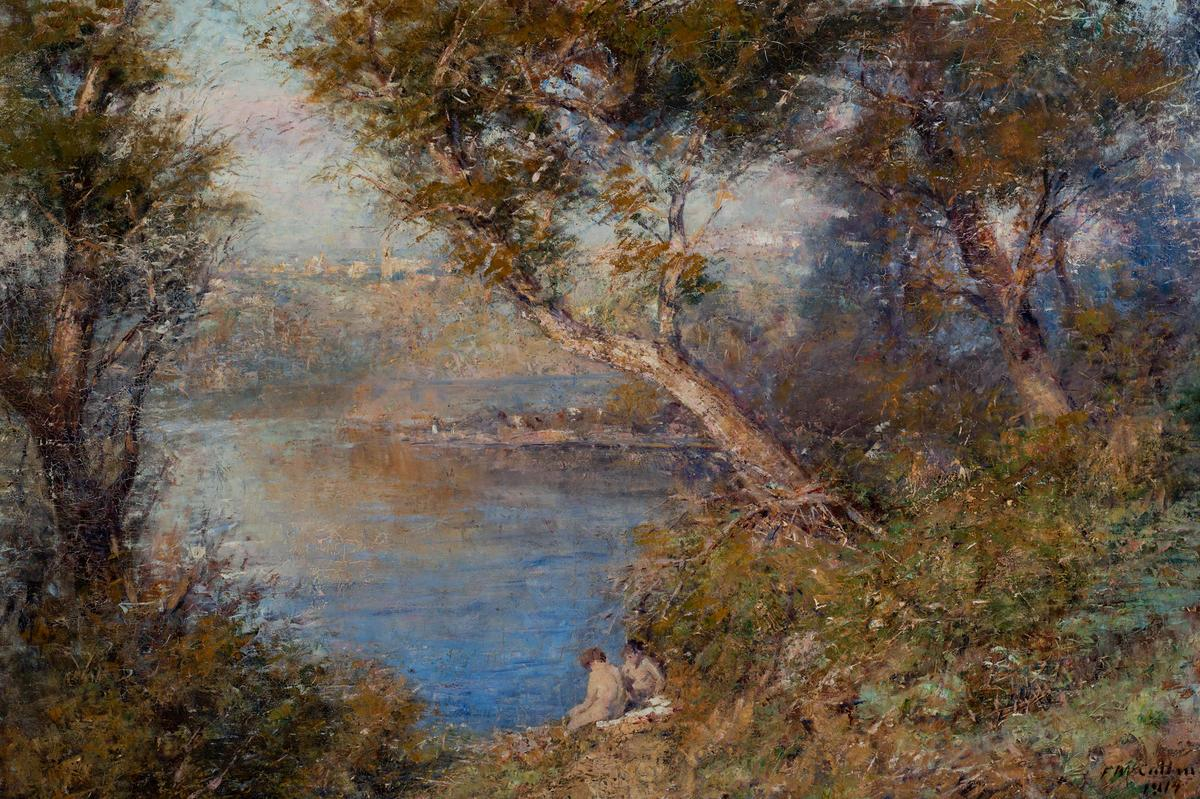
Frederick McCubbin, Golden Sunlight, c. 1914

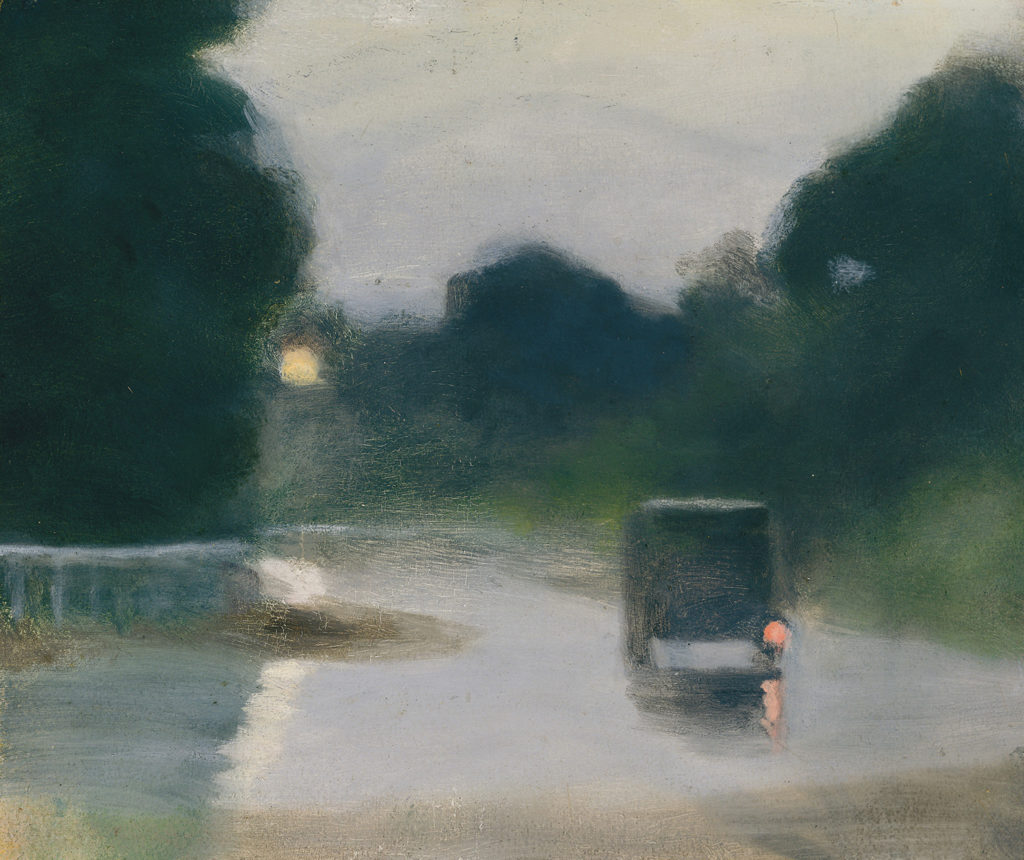
Clarice Beckett, Wet Evening, 1927

=== Management ===
Volunteers administered and managed the Castlemaine Art Gallery and Historical Museum for the first six decades of operations, opening Monday-Sunday 1-5pm and 2.30-5pm Sunday, but for a period having to close for lack of a caretaker. George Brentwood Clark was Honorary Secretary of the Castlemaine Art Gallery from 1915 until his death at 49 years in April 1937, his position being taken up by his wife in the following month. In 1962, the requirements of the Regional Galleries Association of Victoria necessitated the appointment of professional staff. This transition to being a managed cultural organisation was handled largely by Beth Sinclair (1919–2014) who, when she moved to Castlemaine in 1953, was introduced to the Gallery by her husband Alec who was on its committee. As reported in 1948 by Castlemaine Technical School lecturer in Art Colin Hunt to an audience at Horsham interested in repeating the success of Castlemaine Art Gallery and Museum;

Women have been active in their support of the movement from its inception. They have contributed substantially to its success during the formative period, and are still active in committee. One holds the office of vice president and another leads the selection committee.

Using her background in secretarial work she volunteered to catalogue works and organize the office systems. In 1963 Castlemaine hosted a meeting of the Victorian Public Galleries Association, and in May, Sinclair was able to announce that Castlemaine had secured its rating as one of four 'A' class regional galleries and would retain its government funding.

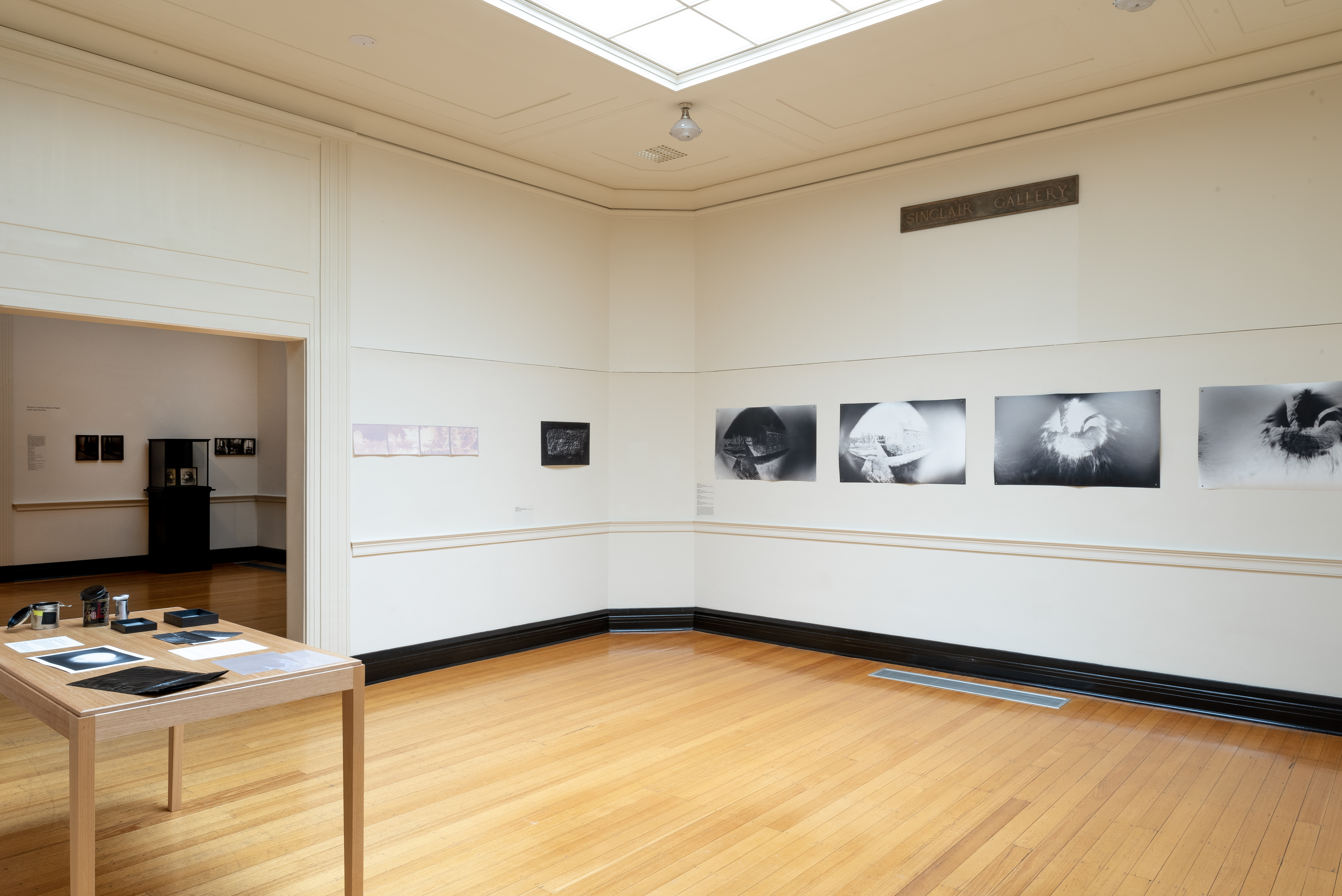
Castlemaine Art Museum's Sinclair Gallery, view to SW, during 'Orbit' exhibition; Tara Gilbee's Ellipses 2023

Sinclair was appointed the Gallery's first Director in 1969, and was the first woman to be a public gallery director in Australia. She was rigorous in her management of the collection and the daily running of the Gallery, and established a network of individuals and organisations all over Australia for purchases and loans of artworks and a regular schedule of exhibitions. A significant acquisition of contemporary art, made in her first year as Director, was Fred Williams' Silver Landscape, painted 1968 In 2000, after her retirement in 1975 and in celebration of the extensive renovations Sinclair donated her personal collection of Australian art, including watercolour landscapes by Reginald Sturgess, works by Rick Amor, E. W. Syme and other painters, which was presented in the inaugural exhibition The Beth Sinclair Donation of Australian Art in the new temporary exhibitions gallery. The north-east corner gallery was named in her honour.

When Sinclair retired, and on her recommendation, after he and his twin brother John, who had been collecting since their teens, held a 1974 exhibition of their collection of Australian paintings, the committee appointed Peter Perry as the next Director, at 23 years old the youngest in Australia, into the role he was to serve for thirty-eight years before his retirement in 2014. He was assisted by the Gallery's first curator Lauretta Zilles from 1986 to 1995 and Kirsten McKay, 1995 to 2014. In interview, Perry acknowledged the importance of women in the history of the gallery and its collection;

"The gallery was founded by women in 1913. They were women artists here or wives of local dignitaries and their war cry was 'No art, no culture; no culture, no nation'. We also had the first woman director appointed to an Australian public gallery: Beth Sinclair. It's not that we've pushed women artists. We just have that tradition and it's always been there. I've tended since my earliest days in the '70s to support research of women artists."

Perry also introduced musical recitals in the Gallery, and talks with presenters including James Mollison, then director of the National Gallery of Australia; and Dr. Eric Westbrook, then Director, Ministry of the Arts, for a champagne brunch talk on appreciation and enjoyment of art. In 2022 Perry was awarded a Medal of the Order of Australia (OAM) for his service in the museums and galleries field.

=== List of directors ===
- 1969 to 1975: Beth Sinclair
- 1975 to 2014: Peter Perry OAM
- 2014 to 2017: Jennifer Kalionis
- 2019 to 2025: Naomi Cass (Director, CAM Renewal)
- from 2025: Leslie Gurusnghe as Chief Operations Officer

== Renewal ==
In 2015, gallery members, for the purpose of accountability and compliance voted for the gallery to become incorporated. However a consequence was that income from the SR Stoneman Foundation a major annual philanthropic endowment, which had been worth $30,000 per year over 13 years, was lost due to its condition that the Gallery remain unincorporated. Thus, due to lack of funds, the Art Museum faced a forced closure on 11 August 2017. It was saved when a town hall meeting in Castlemaine on 2 August announced a $50,000 gift from the Macfarlane Fund, launched concomitantly in honour of the late businessman Don Macfarlane, for whom the gallery was his favourite, and given on the condition of greater support from Mount Alexander council. Combined with a $250,000 donation by an anonymous couple, by fundraising efforts amongst local supporters, and a government grant, the money meant the gallery would remain open to the public giving time for sustainable revenue to be sourced, though difficulties, as identified by The Institute of Community Directors Australia, remained.

Naomi Cass, previously director of the Centre for Contemporary Photography, was appointed Director, CAM Renewal, in January 2019, and reopened the gallery, free of charge to visitors at the request of the benefactors and, after some refurbishment in November, in December launched the Strategic Plan for Castlemaine Art Museum 2019–2023 – connecting people through Art, History and Ideas In the 2019-20 financial year the budget returned to surplus.

After Cass retired in 2025, the Board opted to fill the directorial role with a Chief Operations Officer. University of Ottawa Juris Doctor Leslie Gurusnghe, former Development and Engagement Manager of the Hellenic Museum in Melbourne, was appointed on 18 November 2025, and in March 2026 oversaw the appointment of the design team for the museum’s redevelopment funded by the Victorian State government.

== Outreach ==
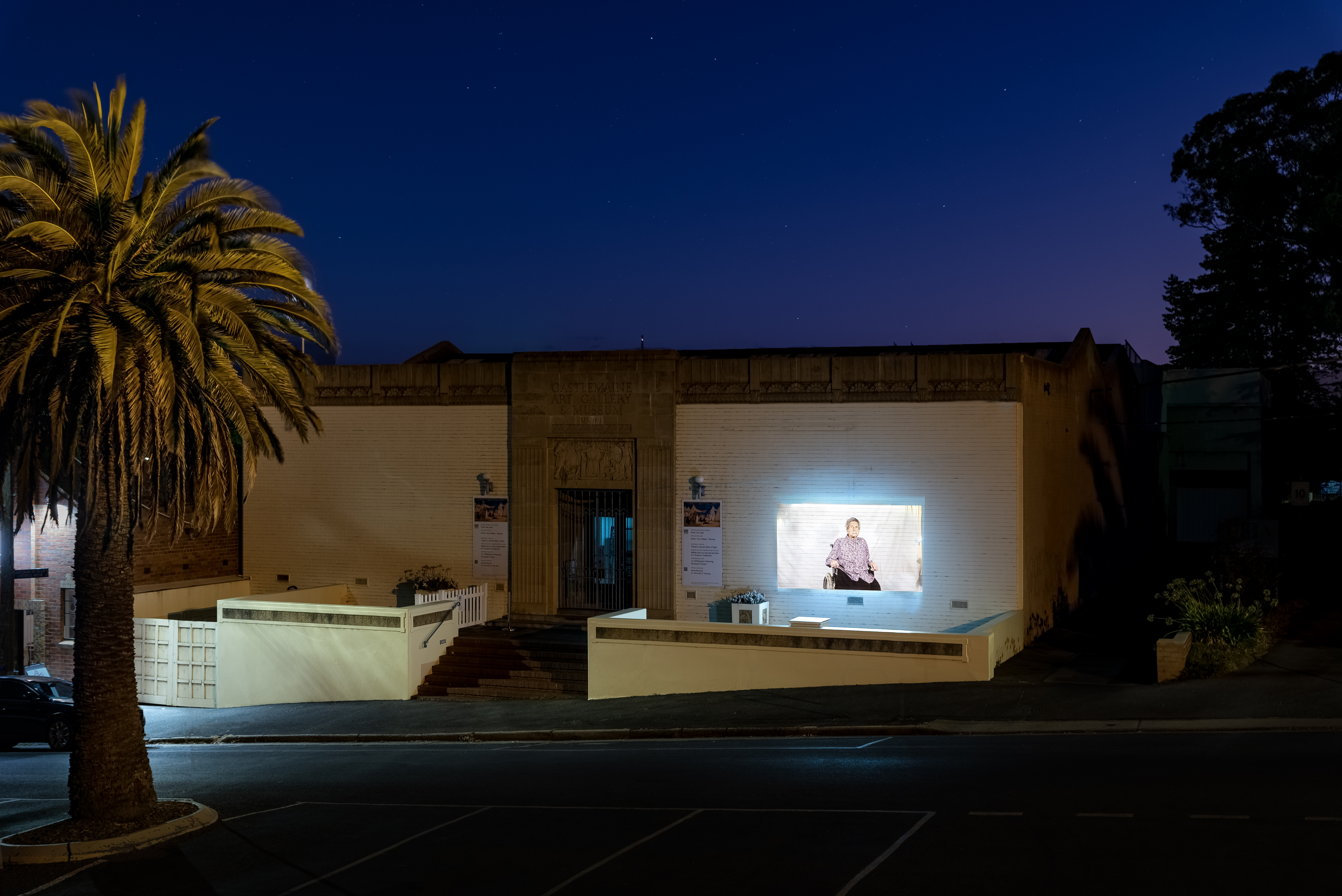
Elevated evening view of Castlemaine Art Museum with the Terrace Projection: Jesse Boylan At the end of the day, 2023, showing on the facade

In 2019, CAM commenced a pilot inclusivity program to engage with three communities impeded in attending and enjoying CAM; First Nations young people, people with disability, and young people at risk. Participants were recruited through Nalderun, the Mount Alexander Shire Disability Advocacy Group, the local hospital and local school teachers. Ideas were received concerning solutions to increasing accessibility and relevance.

In 2021 the Art Museum updated its website, including online access and searching of its collection. Reflections, a series of commentaries on works from members of the gallery's community is included.

From 2020 the Museum held 'Orbit;' shows by significant local artists in its Benefactor's gallery, moving later to the Sinclair gallery, and in 2022 commenced a series of public 'Terrace Projections;' digital video projected onto its facade during night-time hours.

For the Castlemaine State Festival in March 2026, Chief Operations Officer Leslie Gurusnghe, with the Friends of Castlemaine Art Museum, conducted an Artists Studio Walk to tour the studios of fifty-three artist residents throughout the town, and in expanding outreach recruited front-of-house volunteers and interns with visual arts qualifications.

=== Awards and prizes ===
As early as 1928 Castlemaine Art Gallery offered a generous acquisitive prize of 40 guineas (A$3,484.70 value in 2020) for "the best oil or watercolour painting submitted, the works to be judged by Sir John Longstaff". The biennial $3,000 James Farrell Self Portrait Award was founded in 1991, but is longer being held. The biannual Clunes Ceramic Award, jointly offered by the Art Gallery of Ballarat and the Castlemaine Art Museum with a total prize money of $5000 was last opened in 2019 and was then postponed. In 2021Castlemaine Art Museum continued to encourage artists with the following awards:

==== Experimental Print Prize ====
Established in 2019, a biennial, non-acquisitive prize. Open to Victoria-resident artists resident in Victoria, an anonymous local donor provides three prizes: $10,000, $5,000 and $3,000 for an emerging artist.

==== Len Fox Painting Award ====
The Len Fox Painting Award is the Castlemaine Art Museum's $50,000 biennial acquisitive award and among the richest in the nation. It is awarded to a living Australian artist to commemorate the life and work of Emmanuel Phillips Fox, the uncle of Len Fox, partner of CAM benefactor Mona Fox.

=== Associations ===
CAM is a member of the Public Galleries Association of Victoria which CAM's 2025 'Framed' exhibition was shortlisted in the PGAV Awards on 26 April 2026. The Museum is accredited by the Australian Museums and Galleries Association.

== Exhibitions ==
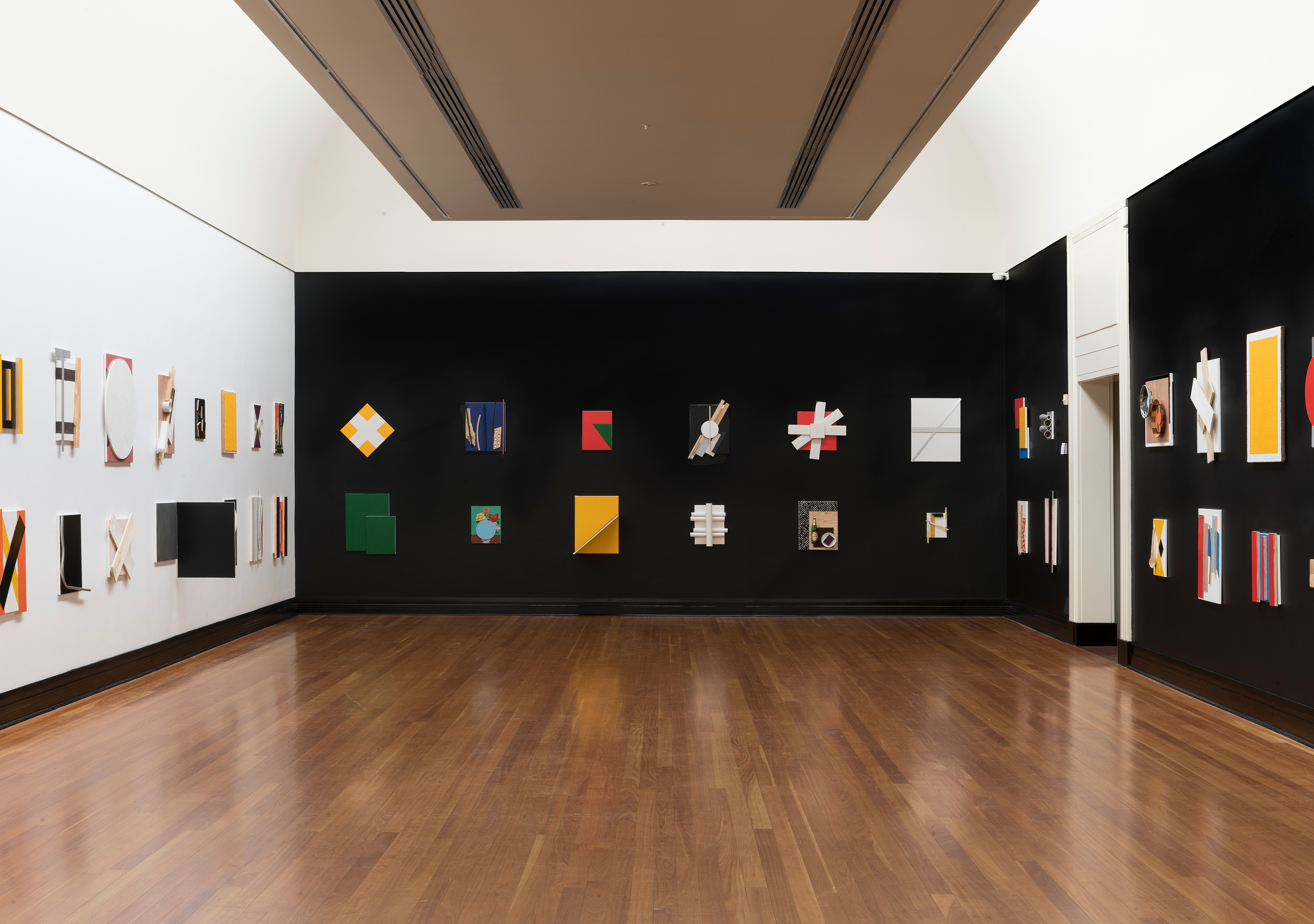
19 March–25 June 2017 exhibition of John Nixon's EPW in the Stoneman Gallery of Castlemaine Art Museum

== Publications ==
- Castlemaine Art Gallery and Historical Museum (1953), Castlemaine Art Gallery and Museum, The Gallery
- Castlemaine Art Gallery and Historical Museum (1972). An exhibition of fifty chairs of the 19th and early 20th centuries: catalogue. Castlemaine, Vic.: Castlemaine Art Gallery and Historical Museum. OCLC 220905271.
- Castlemaine Art Gallery and Historical Museum (1973), Castlemaine Art Gallery and Historical Museum, Castlemaine Art Gallery and Historical Museum
- Castlemaine Art Gallery and Historical Museum (1976). A. E. Newbury: Castlemaine Art Gallery & Historical Museum, 16th Oct. – 28th Nov., 1976. Castlemaine, Vic.: Castlemaine Art Gallery and Historical Museum. OCLC 739118794.
- Bale, A. M. E. (Alice Marian Ellen); Castlemaine Art Gallery and Historical Museum (1977), A.M.E. Bale: Castlemaine Art Gallery, 11th September-30th October, 1977, Castlemaine Art Gallery
- Clark, Marc; Victorian College of the Arts; Castlemaine Art Gallery and Historical Museum (1978). Marc Clark: sculptures 1968–78. Warrnambool, Vic.: Warrnambool Art Gallery. OCLC 223143468.
- Newell, Lucy (1978). The Newell family. Castlemaine: Castlemaine Art Gallery and Historical Museum. OCLC 221717594.
- Ellis, Stanley J. (1979). The school of Stanley J. Ellis: Castlemaine Art Gallery & Historical Museum, 5th May – 3rd June, 1979. Castlemaine, Vic.: Castlemaine Art Gallery & Historical Museum. OCLC 1058493426.
- Notes, nocturnes & harmonies. Castlemaine Art Gallery. 1980. OCLC 222029063.
- Castlemaine Art Gallery and Historical Museum (1981), Two centuries of Australian bird illustrations, Castlemaine Art Gallery
- Castlemaine Art Gallery and Historical Museum (1981), Aspects of Castlemaine, 1854-1980: [exhibition] Castlemaine Art Gallery & Historical Museum, 25th. October – 23rd. November, the Art Gallery & Historical Museum
- Perry, Peter (1982). E. Phillips Fox & Ethel Carrick: an exhibition of impressionist paintings. publisher not identified. OCLC 222032057.
- Hurry, Polly; Castlemaine Art Gallery and Historical Museum; McClelland Gallery (1983), Polly Hurry, 1883-1963: a retrospective, Castlemaine Art Gallery
- Perry, Peter (1986). R. W. Sturgess, water-colourist, 1892–1932. Beth Sinclair. [Castlemaine]: Castlemaine Art Gallery and Historical Museum. ISBN 0-9598066-3-6. OCLC 21594920.
- Evergood, Miles; Castlemaine Art Gallery and Historical Museum; Jewish Museum of Australia; Carrick Hill (Springfield, S.A.: House) (1988), Miles Evergood, 1871-1939: retrospective, Castlemaine Art Gallery & Historical Museum
- Castlemaine Art Gallery and Historical Museum; Perry, Peter; Sinclair, Beth (1988). Seventy-five years: 1913–1988. Castlemaine, Vic.: The Gallery. ISBN 978-0-9598066-4-9. OCLC 222849742.
- Leason, Percy; Castlemaine Art Gallery and Historical Museum (1989). Percy Leason, 1889–1959: centenary exhibition. Castlemaine, Vic.: The Museum. OCLC 22859102.
- Pubs and breweries of Castlemaine and district. Castlemaine, Vic.: Castlemaine Art Gallery & Historical Museum. 1989. OCLC 221511151.
- Craig, Sybil (1990). The Sybil Craig Bequest: 13 July – 5 August, 1990. Castlemaine, Vic.: Castlemaine Art Gallery & Historical Museum. OCLC 222843220.
- Zilles, Lauretta (1991). Maladies, medicos & miracle cures: a guide to the history of medicine in Castlemaine and district from 1851 – c.1950. Castlemaine, Vic.: Castlemaine Art Gallery & Historical Museum. OCLC 221334617.
- Lindsay, Arthur J. (1991). Arthur J. Lindsay, 1912–1990: retrospective. Castlemaine, Vic.: Castlemaine Art Gallery & Historical Museum. OCLC 221782696.
- Castlemaine Art Gallery and Historical Museum (1991), A catalogue of Australian ceramics, Castlemaine Art Gallery and Historical Museum, ISBN 978-0-9598066-5-6
- Herbert, Harold B.; Castlemaine Art Gallery and Historical Museum (1992). Harold B. Herbert watercolours, 31 October – 6 December, 1992. Castlemaine Art Gallery & Historical Museum.
- Stavrianos, Wendy (1994). Wendy Stavrianos: mantles of darkness. Castlemaine Art Gallery and Historical Museum. OCLC 222005695.
- Bush, Charles; Davies, June; Palmer, Jock; Castlemaine Art Gallery and Historical Museum (1994), Charles Bush: self-portraits 1936–1986: Castlemaine Art Gallery and Historical Museum, 3 September-2 October 1994, Castlemaine Art Gallery and Historical Museum, ISBN 978-0-646-19872-9
- Flynn silver, past and present: Castlemaine Art Gallery and Historical Museum, 6 March – 10 April 1994. Bendigo, Vic.: Richard Cambridge Printers. 1994. OCLC 221782605.
- Dent, John (1994). John Dent: retrospective 1973–1993: Castlemaine Art Gallery and Historical Museum, 29 October – 4 December, 1994. Castlemaine Art Gallery and Historical Museum. Castlemaine, Vic.: The Gallery. ISBN 0-646-21117-X. OCLC 35831072.
- McKay, Kirsten; McKay, Kirsten; Castlemaine Art Gallery and Historical Museum (1995), Women printmakers 1910-1940: in the Castlemaine Art Gallery and Historical Museum, Castlemaine Art Gallery and Historical Museum, ISBN 978-0-646-23161-7
- Murphy, Phyllis (1996). Historic wallpapers in Australia, 1850–1920. Castlemaine, Vic.: Castlemaine Art Gallery and Historical Museum. ISBN 978-0-9598066-6-3. OCLC 38757268.
- Perry, Peter W. (1996). Max Meldrum & associates: their art, lives and influences. John R. Perry, Max Meldrum. Castlemaine, Vic.: Castlemaine Art Gallery and Historical Museum. ISBN 0-9598066-7-9. OCLC 38415991.
- Armstrong, Ian; Castlemaine Art Gallery and Historical Museum (1999), Ian Armstrong retrospective 1941-1998, Castlemaine Art Gallery and Historical Museum, ISBN 978-0-9587299-1-8
- Castlemaine Art Gallery and Historical Museum (2001). Fraser Fair: a retrospective. Peter Perry. Castlemaine: Castlemaine Art Gallery and Historical Museum. ISBN 0-9587299-3-X. OCLC 935586136.
- Griffin, Murray, ed. (2001). Murray Griffin – the journey: a retrospective 1922–1980; Castlemaine Art Gallery and Historical Museum, 27. May to 1. July 2001; Eastgate Gallery, Hawthorn, Victoria, 25. July to 24. August 2001. Castlemaine, Vic.: Castlemaine Art Gallery and Historical Museum. OCLC 314370902.
- Lewis, Martin (2002). Martin Lewis: stepping into the light. Kirsten McKay. Castlemaine, Vic.: Castlemaine Art Gallery and Historical Museum. ISBN 0-9587299-4-8. OCLC 155794636.
- Davies, June (2002). A tribute to June Davies. Castlemaine, Vic.: Castlemaine Art Gallery and Historical Museum. ISBN 978-0-9587299-5-6. OCLC 225428434.
- Stoneman, Stuart R. (2003), Highlights from the Stuart R. Stoneman art collection, Castlemaine Art Gallery & Historical Museum
- Colquhoun, A. (2004). Alexander Colquhoun: 1862–1941: artist and critic. Castlemaine, Vic.: Castlemaine Art Gallery and Historical Museum. ISBN 978-0-9587299-8-7. OCLC 62545517.
- Geelong Art Gallery; Castlemaine Art Gallery and Historical Museum; Carrick Hill (Springfield, S.A.: House); Mornington Peninsula Regional Gallery (2005), Venezia Australis: Australian artists in Venice, 1900-2000: a touring exhibition of oils watercolours, prints, drawings and photographs, Castlemaine Art Gallery and Historical Museum, ISBN 978-0-9757388-0-1
- Craig, Sybil (2006). Sybil Craig 1901–89: modernist painter. Kirsten McKay, Geelong Gallery, Mornington Peninsula Regional Gallery. Castlemaine: Castlemaine Art Gallery and Historical Museum. ISBN 0-9757388-1-X. OCLC 225240436.
- Braund, Dorothy; A'Beckett, Jan; Hamilton Art Gallery (Vic.) (2006). Dorothy Braund: retrospective. Castlemaine, Vic.: Castlemaine Art Gallery and Historical Museum. ISBN 978-0-9757388-2-5. OCLC 225138812.
- Baldessin, George; Turner, Dick; Castlemaine Art Gallery and Historical Museum (2007). European sensibilities: George Baldessin and his circle: printmaking in Melbourne during the 1960s and 1970s. Castlemaine, Vic.: Castlemaine Art Gallery and Historical Museum. ISBN 978-0-9757388-4-9. OCLC 225428312.
- Kovacic, Katherine (2007). The art of the dog. Castlemaine, Vic.: Castlemaine Art Gallery and Historical Museum. ISBN 978-0-9757388-3-2. OCLC 225438828.
- Klein, Deborah; Soumilas, Diane (2008). Deborah Klein: out of the past 1995–2007. Castlemaine, Vic.: Castlemaine Art Gallery and Historical Museum. OCLC 298663997.
- Ramsay, Donald (2008). Donald Ramsay: artist in a landscape. Castlemaine, Vic.: Castlemaine Art Gallery. ISBN 978-0-9757388-8-7. OCLC 277184336.
- Courier, Jack; Stocky, Catherine; Castlemaine Art Gallery and Historical Museum. Jack Courier (1915-2007) : lithographs (Limited (500 copies) ed.). Castlemaine: Castlemaine Art Gallery and Historical Museum. OCLC 653970903.
- Chippindall, Tom (2010). Associates of Rupert Bunny. Castlemaine: Castlemaine Art Gallery and Historical Museum. ISBN 978-0-9757388-9-4. OCLC 682514952.
- Edwards, Annette (2010). Annette Edwards: ... a lifetime of mark making. Castlemaine, Vic.: Castlemaine Art Gallery and Historical Museum. ISBN 978-0-9807831-2-4. OCLC 780532076.
- Kovacic, Katherine (2010). Archie & Amalie Colquhoun. Castlemaine, Vic.: Castlemaine Art Gallery and Historical Museum. ISBN 978-0-9807831-0-0. OCLC 608149359.
- Perry, Peter W.; McKay, Kirsten (2011), Scottish painters in Australia, Castlemaine Art Gallery and Historical Museum, ISBN 978-0-9807831-3-1
- Shaw, Peggy; McKay, Kirsten; Castlemaine Art Gallery and Historical Museum (2011). Peggy Shaw: a retrospective. Castlemaine Art Gallery and Historical Museum. ISBN 978-0-9807831-4-8. OCLC 822892917.
- Perry, Peter; Bale, A. M. E. (2011). A. M. E. Bale: her art and life. Castlemaine, Vic.: Castlemaine Art Gallery and Historical Museum. ISBN 978-0-9757388-7-0. OCLC 793570972.
- Moncrieff, Greg (2011). Greg Moncrieff: now and then – : a survey exhibition of selected paintings, screen prints and mixed media works from 1974 to the present. Castlemaine: Castlemaine Art Gallery and Historical Museum. OCLC 760034537.
- Crichton, Richard (2012). Richard Crichton: profile selected works: July 1 – 29, 2012. Hawthorne, Vic.; Castlemaine, Vic.: Eastgate & Holst; Castlemaine Art Gallery and Historical Museum. ISBN 978-0-646-58042-5. OCLC 806368976.
- McKay, Kirsten (2013). Shimmering light: Dora Meeson and the Thames. Castlemaine Art Gallery and Historical Museum. ISBN 978-0-9807831-5-5. OCLC 873675981.
- Singleton, Barry (2013). A retrospective exhibition of ceramics from 1970-2013 by Barry Singleton: Castlemaine Art Gallery. 16.03.2013 – 26.05.2013. Ray Hearn, Castlemaine Art Gallery and Historical Museum. Castlemaine, Vic.: Castlemaine Art Gallery and Historical Museum. ISBN 978-0-9807831-6-2. OCLC 1004506372.
- Amor, Rick; Castlemaine Art Gallery and Historical Museum (2013). Rick Amor: from study to painting: 1 June – 28 July 2013. Castlemaine Art Gallery & Historical Museum. ISBN 978-0-9807831-8-6. OCLC 903203825.
- Meyer, Bill; Castlemaine Art Gallery and Historical Museum (2014). Nurturing the place. Bill Meyer. ISBN 978-0-9593138-0-2. OCLC 897490496.
- Middlemost, Thomas (2015). Inking up: a group exhibition of prints by Clayton Tremlett (curator), Rona Green and Deborah Klein. Castlemaine Art Gallery and Historical Museum. OCLC 927074958.
- Riley, Ginger; Alves, Tim (2015). Ginger Riley: the boss of colour. Castlemaine, Vic.: Castlemaine Art Gallery and Historical Museum. OCLC 920461202.
- Pilgrim, Catherine; McNeil, Peter (2015). Making history: hidden world of the Leviny women. Castlemaine, Vic.: Castlemaine Art Gallery and Historical Museum. OCLC 1158894182.
- Contemporary Australian Silver & Metalwork Award 2015. Castlemaine, Vic.: Castlemaine Art Gallery and Historical Museum; Buda Historic Home and Garden Inc. 2015. ISBN 978-0-9924753-2-1. OCLC 938380301.
- Bill Henson landscapes. Place of publication not identified: Castlemaine Art Gallery &. 2016. ISBN 978-0-9924753-3-8. OCLC 948632099.
- Clayton Tremlett: beard and influence. Castlemaine: Castlemaine Art Gallery and Historical Museum. 2016. ISBN 978-0-9587299-0-1. OCLC 954226415.
- Nixon, John; Cox, Emma; Castlemaine Art Gallery and Historical Museum (2017). John Nixon: experimental painting workshop. Castlemaine Art Gallery & Historical Museum. ISBN 978-0-9598066-1-8. OCLC 982656702.
- Castlemaine Art Museum, (Compiled by) (2021), 2021 Experimental Print Prize : Catalogue for the exhibition held at Castlemaine Art Museum 20 November 2021 – 28 February 2022., Castlemaine Art Museum, ISBN 9780645128437
- Tyndall, Peter (2021). Peter Tyndall : Sinclair+gallery. Catalogue for Peter Tyndall's exhibition 'SINCLAIR+GALLERY', Castlemaine Art Museum 2021-2022. Castlemaine: Castlemaine Art Museum. ISBN 9780645128413.
