= Diane Mantzaris =

Australian artist (born 1962)

- Born: 1962 (age 63–64); Melbourne, Australia
- Education: RMIT University
- Known for: Printmaking, Photography, Painting, Fine Art, Public Art, Digital Fine Art practice

Diane Mantzaris (born 1962) is an Australian artist known for her pioneering application of digital imaging to printmaking and for her unconventional approach to image making, which is often both personal and political in content. Mantzaris pioneered the use of computers as a printmaking and art-making tool in the early to mid-1980s, exhibiting widely, nationally and throughout Asia in touring exhibitions, to considerable acclaim. Her practice now crosses into several fields associated with the visual arts, printmaking, drawing, photography, sculpture, performance and public art. She is represented in most state and public collections throughout Australia and significant private collections throughout Asia and Europe.

== Early life and education ==
Mantzaris was born in Melbourne, Australia. In the late 1970s she studied fine art (Painting) at RMIT University.

== Career ==
Working outside the drift of theoretical attitudes and trends, Mantzaris is regarded as being one of the first, and is the first Australian, artists to use computers as a printmaking tool. Mantzaris has exhibited widely, to considerable acclaim, debate, and even on occasion opposition, in both in her native Australia and overseas.

Mantzaris began realising her imagery via computer technology during its infancy. During a period when it was the domain of the few, and an almost exclusively male domain, Mantzaris was addressing the computer's new potential for making an art that would be accessible to the masses. Her work is unconventional not for the sake of novelty, but as a conscious artistic strategy to subvert through existing assumptions on art, culture and society.

Many consider the imagery in Mantzaris' early black and white, computer-generated lithographs to be startling and confronting. With titles such as 'the Narcissist' and 'Her Alter-Ego', these works incorporate elements of the engravings of Sigmund Freud’s casebook and the photography of Diane Arbus. They seek to recall images stored in our collective memory bank. Amid the sameness of many contemporary artworks, Mantzaris’s computer-generated lithographs have the look of something not seen before.

"The mix of computer graphics and private symbolism sponsors some unsettling images. The grainy quality of the print and the deliberate exploitation of folk idioms conveys the cosiness of a petit-point sampler, but closer observation reveals the little peasant girls to be surrounded by horrors – Madonna’s with bleeding eyes and Christ children with blazing heads. Symbolic sentiment is twisted like the roses which clamber up the torso of one heroine, beginning to ensnare and smother and reveal their true nature as electronic flex cable. It seems incongruous that the pictorial traditions of particularly devotional and martyr art should be so emphatically quoted using state of the art technology. Other works (The Sybil, The Narcissist) point to less encumbered expression. Another key to understanding the artists approach is provided by the print the 'Fuji Mart Builder', depicting a Japanese labourer with a drill on a building construction but posing with heroic indifference, like an action man in modern Japanese comics much loved by the artist. The split toe shoes and head band add a humorous note while the power cord whips around like a wayward umbilical cord. This is more computer-funk than angst." - John Neylon

Whilst Mantzaris's practice was met with opposition from printmaking traditionalists and institutions at that time, and the subject of its 'legitimate use' debated in forums, she also paved the way for artists that followed and computers were later adopted into art school university curricula.

In 1987 Mantzaris was granted a three-month Australia Council residency in Tokyo. In the same year she exhibited a large body of computer-generated lithographs in the solo exhibition 'Modern Legends' at 200 Gertrude Street Gallery, Melbourne. These works toured in exhibitions in public and regional galleries throughout Australia, including: 'Encounters 1', curated by Stephanie Britton, at the South Australian School of Art; 'My Head is a Map', curated by Roger Butler at the Australian National Gallery. The works then toured through Asia, in such exhibitions as: '6x6', which was the first exhibition of prints to tour Thailand, co-ordinated by Asialink and curated Anne Kirker (curator of Asian Art), it was hosted at the Queensland Art Gallery.

Mantzaris returned to Tokyo in 1990, for 'Tokyo Connection', an exhibition of work by artists who had been awarded the Australian artists' studio in Tokyo. Works such as the computer-generated lithograph Fuji Mart Builder (1987) were reproduced widely in the printed media.

In the late 1980s to early 1990s, when scanners had become accessible home-technology, Mantzaris began incorporating collage into her prints. In a work from this period, Beauty Queen No. 14 (Cherry Blossom) (1991), depicting a Japanese man wearing a gown, the shifting layers of imagery are combined with frequent references to the act of seeing, so that the viewer is presented with numerous images depending on their vantage point; thus presenting multi-layered interpretations. The work is less a commentary on Japanese culture than an interrogation of the viewers' perceptions of love, sexuality, taboos and customs. The piece was part of a larger series of boxed constructions of layered laser-printed transparencies which were shown in part at the 1992 Adelaide Biennale of Australian Art, 'Unfamiliar Territory', Art Gallery of South Australia, curated by Tim Morell. Professor Jenny Zimmer wrote of these works that the optical vibration and boxed coffined images convey the private hells, dilemmas and ironies of public existence.

In 1992-93 Mantzaris was granted an Asialink residency at the Silpakorn University in Bangkok, Thailand. It was during this residency that Mantzaris made a body of large thermal wax transfer prints dealing with the military repression and accounts of the crackdown witnessed first-hand during "Black May". Major works such as Dance the Backstep (Behind the smile of greed), and Slaves of State (1993) address the officially sanctioned view of the dynamics of Thai and Australian politics. These works have become social manifestos which engage with the social and political issues of Australia and its Asian neighbours on several levels. The prints which grew out of these experiences brought together her perceptions of life in Bangkok, an awareness of the heritage of protest poster art, combined with mastery of a technology-based art practice, to produce prints of a nightmarish intensity where lynching parties and institutions of culture co-exist.

In 2000, Mantzaris' interests shifted to exhibiting outside the gallery and into public spaces. She was engaged to develop concepts for the design and manufacture of two public art works. She would envisage working class ideology on a monumental scale, across two major freeway interventions en route into and out of the western suburbs of Melbourne. The project had the invested interests of 7 western councils, Victorian State Government, Vicroads, with Mantzaris working in association with BM architects. Billboard installation 'Working Class heroes' was shelved after dozens of relocations pre-construction and 4 years of meetings with local authorities, whilst being covered and supported by the art community and media. 'House in the Sky', is: a house-sized 2D sculpture of a 3D drawing in fabricated steel, suspended across a busy freeway, the western ringroad interchange. The generic home in 2D is designed to flip out into the motorists' view on passing, before disappearing from view. At least on one level, it was conceived as a working class dream home, one which had once been achievable by many migrants who had arrived in Australia in destitute circumstances.

Mantzaris works from her studio in Northcote, Melbourne and continues to work and exhibit within Australia and Asia.

== Collections ==
- National Gallery of Victoria
- Queensland Art Gallery
- Art Gallery of South Australia
- Tasmanian Museum and Art Gallery
- State Library of Victoria
- Queen Victoria Museum & Art Gallery, Launceston
- University of Tasmania
- Shepparton Art Gallery
- Warrnambool Art Gallery
- Ballarat Fine Art Gallery
- Castlemaine Art Museum
- Naracoote Art Gallery, South Australia
- Brisbane City Hall Art Gallery
- University of Central Queensland
- Queensland University of Technology
- University Art Museum, Queensland
- Gold Coast City Art Gallery
- Flinders University Art Museum, South Australia
- Gordon Technical College, Victoria
- Macrobertson Girls High School, Melbourne
- Ruyton Girls School, Victoria
- Norwood Secondary College, Victoria
- Fintona Girls College, Victoria
- St Kilda Council, Victoria
- Print Council of Australia
- BHP Canson Australia Pty Ltd
- Parliament House Collection, Canberra
- Monash University
- The Melbourne Club
- Janet Holmes à Court Collection
- Artbank, Sydney
- HOTA, Queensland

Corporate and Private Collections, Australia, India, Cuba, Japan, USA, Greece, Thailand.
