= Basil Burdett =

Australian art critic and gallery director (1897–1942)

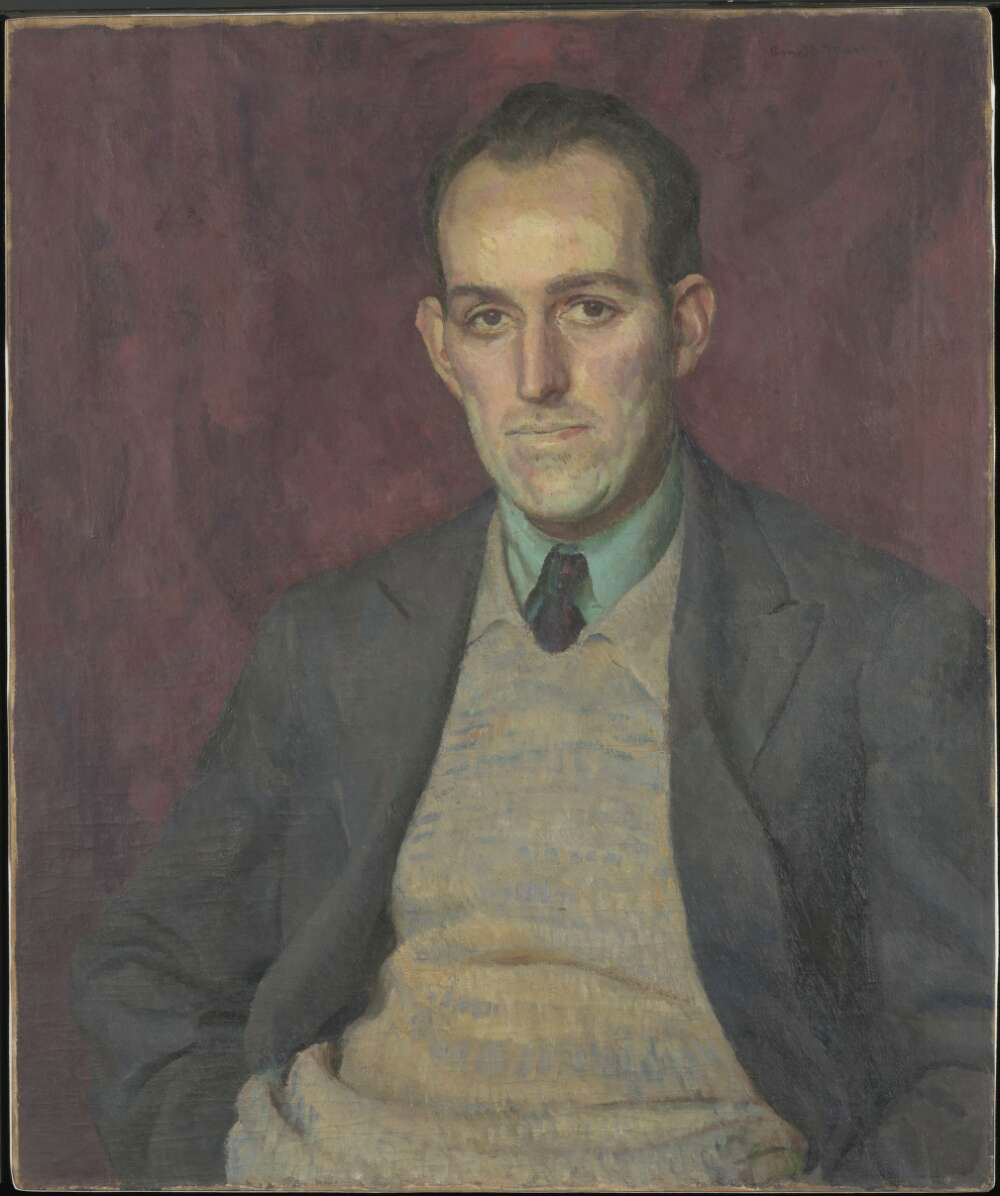
- Arnold Mason (1931) Basil Burdett
- Born: July 23, 1897; Ipswich, Queensland
- Died: February 1, 1942 (aged 44); Surabaya, East Java
- Occupations: journalist, art critic, gallery director, art curator, art collector
- Employer: Keith Murdoch
- Organization: The Herald (Melbourne)
- Known for: Art criticism for the Herald (1936–1941)
- Notable work: 1939 Herald Exhibition of French and British Contemporary Art
- Spouse: Edith Napier Birks
- Children: one daughter

Basil Burdett (23 July 1897 – 1 February 1942) was an Australian journalist, art critic, gallery director and cultural organiser. He was art critic for the Herald (Melbourne) from 1936 and curator of the influential Herald Exhibition of French and British Contemporary Art (1939), which played a pivotal role in introducing European modernism to Australian audiences.

== Early life and education ==
Burdett was born in Ipswich, Queensland, the sole illegitimate child of Lillie Jane Gray, and William Burdett, clerk, who soon abandoned the family. His mother raised Basil in Enoggera, Brisbane in circumstances he avoided mentioning even to friends.

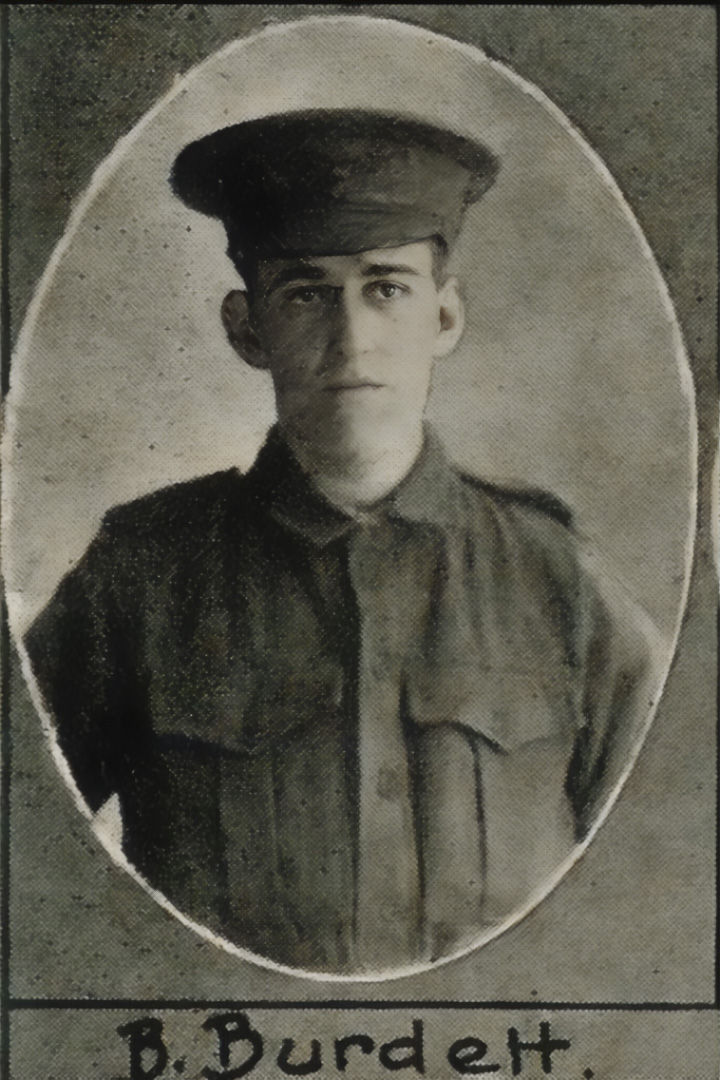
Basil Burdett in 1916 as a soldier, from The Queenslander Pictorial, supplement to The Queenslander, 18 March 1916, p23

In September 1915, aged eighteen, Burdett enlisted and served on the Western Front with the 1st Field Ambulance in the Australian Imperial Force. Before sailing home he spent three months in London undertaking commercial training — a practical interlude that would prove less consequential than the exposure to a city whose galleries, bookshops, and cultural life bore no resemblance to anything he had known in Queensland, an experience that shaped his later critical outlook.

Burdett was demobilised in Brisbane in October 1919, and Haese notes that it is doubtful that he ever returned to the city of his birth.

== Journalism and early criticism ==
After returning to Australia, Burdett worked as a journalist for the Brisbane Daily Mail, where he began publishing art criticism. His early reviews show an interest in stylistic innovation and an impatience with provincial standards of critique. In 1921 he moved to Sydney to pursue opportunities in gallery management and art publishing.

== Sydney galleries ==
Burdett moved to Sydney in 1921 and established the New Art Salon at 24 Bond Street, and then Pitt Street (it became Grosvenor Gallery), before moving it again to 219 George St. and operating it simultaneously with another art dealership. In 1925, with John Young, he co-founded the Macquarie Galleries at Strathkyle, 19 Bligh Street, which now at other locations remains a significant venue for contemporary Australian art. Artists for whose shows Burdett wrote catalogues include Sydney Lough Thomson and Lionel Lindsay The gallery's financial foundations were, according to later accounts, substantially secured by the fortune of Edith Napier Birks of Adelaide, whom Burdett married on 22 December 1925 in Melbourne. The couple lived in Wahroonga, in a house designed by their friend the architect J. D. Moore. The marriage ended in separation in 1929, after the couple had one daughter, born in 1927. His association with the Macquarie Galleries also ended as a consequence: along with his marriage, he lost a valuable collection of old English glass, china, furniture, books, and paintings accumulated during years of entrepreneurship.

== Art in Australia ==
Burdett was associate editor and a frequent contributor to the journal Art in Australia, edited by Sydney Ure Smith. His writing there introduced European critical approaches to Australian readers and argued for the necessity of international standards in evaluating local art.

== European travel ==
Between 1929, after the end of his marriage, and 1931, Burdett travelled widely in Britain, France, Spain and Italy, adding Italian to the French and Spanish he was already acquiring. Spain held a particular attraction; he would later say that he loved the country partly because 'there men kissed naturally and nobody looked askance': an oblique acknowledgement of his homosexuality which in his home country and a decade would be an admission that carried real risk. The Basque philosopher Miguel de Unamuno, whose romantic liberal humanism Burdett deeply admired, was a figure who seemed to embody the 'whole man' Burdett sought both in art and in life. Visiting the major museums and many commercial galleries deepened his knowledge of modern French and British painting. He returned briefly to Australia in 1931 for the divorce proceedings, then again lived largely in Europe between 1933 and 1935. These experiences underpinned the comparative approach that later distinguished his criticism in Melbourne.

== Melbourne and The Herald ==
Burdett moved to Melbourne in the mid-1930s, where he lived in the Art Deco Alcaston House on the corner of Collins and Spring St opposite the Treasury Building. He was hired as a senior reporter on the Herald under managing director Sir Keith Murdoch, who in 1931 had purchased an interest in Art in Australia, which brought Burdett to his attention, who in 1936 Murdoch made the newspaper's art critic, displacing Lionel Lindsay, with whom he remained friendly. Burdett's weekly columns addressed painting, sculpture, architecture, design and ballet, and advocated a cosmopolitan cultural outlook.

Through Macquarie Galleries in Sydney and in conjunction with Keith Murdoch's The Herald and Weekly Times he organised An Exhibition of Present-Day Australian Art, whch was shown at the AGNSW and the Lower Town Hall in Melbourne in February 1935. Nevertheless, he criticised the dominance of landscape painting in Australia and urged greater attention to the figure, the city and contemporary life. In a formulation he repeated in various forms across the late 1930s, he wrote:

Our painters today seem to have lifted up their eyes to the hills, and to have permanently focused them there. The landscape setting of our life absorbs them. The life itself is neglected. Our painting is like a novel without any characters. Landscape pervades our exhibitions like a recurring decimal monotonously repeated ad infinitum. Is there nothing in our life worth depicting on canvas?

Burdett argued instead for a vigorous urban humanism— the life of Fitzroy as much as its setting, the inner city as a potential artistic milieu like Chelsea or Montmartre. His affection for Melbourne's streets found expression in articles like 'A Jolimont Ramble' and his writing for photographer Wilhelm Ludwig Lucke-Meyer's 1934 Melbourne by Night in which he described the city's quiet morning hours and magical winter evenings with the sensibility of a Baudelairean flâneur:

Below me, 120 feet, is Collins Street, its lamps snared in the twining tracery of elm trees and planes. Melbourne seems older at night—“vieux, archivieux" even, like Daudet’s peasant, like London or Paris or Rome. Who could believe, at night, this is a city not yet a hundred years old?

Can it really be less than a century that the gum tree rustled on these Eastern slopes and a tiny village hid its primitive dwellings beyond a thick belt of bush which stretched as far West as Swanston Street? Here is romance as potent as any legend of older centres—a far-flung city, more expansive in area than most of Europe’s capitals, risen in the wilderness in less than ten short decades.

Burdett brought to the role a combination of qualities virtually unprecedented in Australian criticism: genuine multilingual fluency, extensive first-hand experience of European galleries and studios, and a theoretical framework that owed much to the English critic Roger Fry — a conviction that art must reconcile formal values with imaginative experience, and that the two cannot be separated without destroying both. He also brought a cutting wit and a willingness to engage with the full range of visual culture, from stamp design and glass manufacture to road-building, architecture and town planning. Noticed as an Oscar Wildean figure on opening nights, he reviewed the ballet performances of the de Basil 'Ballet Russes' during their Melbourne seasons.

In the Herald's columns, Burdett launched what his contemporaries experienced as trenchant attacks on the establishment Australian art world—measured always against international standards, and therefore doubly uncomfortable for those whose reputations had been constructed in isolation from them. When Robert Menzies declared with complacency that he represented "a class of people which will, in the next one hundred years, determine the permanent place to be occupied in the world of art by those painting today", Burdett responded that: "People like Mr Menzies, of course, have the advantage over those who have patiently tried to unravel the still unsolved riddle of what art is." Burdett wrote announcing the formal founding of Menzies' Australian Academy of Art but detailed at length the widespread—and ultimately effective—opposition to its receiving a Royal charter.

While sympathetic to modernist tendencies, Burdett resisted doctrinaire positions and argued for pluralism in modern art. His criticism combined formal analysis with humanist values and comparative reference to European developments.

== 1939 Herald Exhibition ==
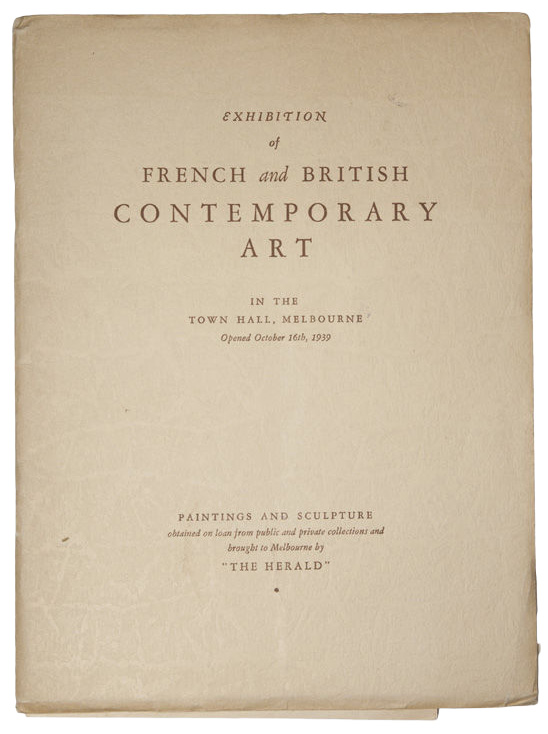
Catalogue cover 1939 Herald Exhibition of French and British Contemporary Art

In 1938 Burdett was commissioned by the Herald to travel to Europe to assemble a major exhibition of contemporary French and British art. It was the defining project of his career, an act, as Haese acknowledges, of considerable cultural courage, given that it was conceived and organised against the backdrop of a continent preparing for war.

As he moved through the galleries of Paris and London, meeting artists, dealers, and advisers and selecting works, Burdett filed a series of articles for the Melbourne Herald, the Adelaide Advertiser, and the Sydney's Daily Telegraph. These were dispatches of remarkable range: part criticism, part journalism, part cultural memoir. Calvert-Jones, Murdoch's daughter, later described them as having 'the air of a last grand tour, recording the journey of a cultivated gentleman with access to the highest circles as well as to bohemia'

The Herald Exhibition of French and British Contemporary Art opened in Melbourne 16 October 1939— three weeks after Britain had declared war on Germany. It represented 59 painters and 9 sculptors, with 217 works, approximately three-quarters of them available for purchase. Among the artists represented were Cézanne, Matisse, Picasso, Braque, Vlaminck, Utrillo, Sickert, and Augustus John. It subsequently toured, and for Australian audiences, it was unprecedented in scope and ambition. It presented more than 200 works by leading modernists, including figures associated with post-impressionism, cubism and fauvism, and was unprecedented in scale for Australia.

The exhibition provoked intense debate. Conservative critics denounced modernism as decadent, while supporters regarded the exhibition as a watershed in Australian engagement with European art. Burdett's catalogue essays and press coverage framed the exhibition as pluralist rather than doctrinaire, arguing that “modern art” encompassed multiple tendencies.

== War service and death ==
In January 1941 Burdett joined the Australian Red Cross Field Force and served as deputy assistant commissioner for Australian and British Red Cross operations in Southeast Asia. On 1 February 1942 he was killed in an aircraft crash in the Dutch East Indies during the Japanese advance. He was 44.

== Reception and legacy ==
Burdett's criticism is regarded as a formative influence on the reception of modernism in Australia. Historians have characterised him as a cultural intermediary who imported evaluative standards from Europe into Australian journalism and helped legitimate cosmopolitanism in mainstream art discourse. As Richard Haese writes:

Between 1936 and 1941 Burdett brought to art criticism in Australia a unique combination of aesthetic perception, intellectual awareness and open-minded sympathy for the work of the young and the avant-garde. His closest cultural ties were with the values of European society and he felt frustrated by parochial attitudes towards the arts in Australia [. . .] It is to his great credit that he recognized immediately and promoted the work of artists such as Sidney Nolan, Albert Tucker, Arthur Boyd and Danila Vassilieff.

Burdett was awarded the Society of Artists (NSW) Medal posthumously in 1943.

== Selected publications ==
- Articles and criticism in Art in Australia (1920s–1930s)
- Art criticism for the Herald (1936–1941)
- Basil Burdett: A collection of thirty-seven letters relating to art, addressed to Basil Burdett from the following: Wilhelm Backhaus; Muirhead Bone; Elioth Gruner; Augustus John; George Washington Lambert; Norman Alfred Williams Lindsay; Sir John Longstaff; Edward Vance Palmer; Henry Handel Richardson; Frank Rinder; Philip Wilson Steer; Arthur Streeton; Randolph Schwabe; Henry Tonks. State Library of Victoria
- Burdett, Basil; Thompson, Sydney Lough; Macquarie Galleries (May 1925). Exhibition of paintings by Sydney Thompson, May 6th to 16th 1925 at Macquarie Galleries, Sydney (Exhibition catalogue ed.). Sydney: Macquarie Galleries.
- Burdett, Basil; Lindsay, Lionel; Young, John Henry (6 December 1927). Exhibition: recent etchings and drypoints of Spain by Lionel Lindsay : December 6th to 16th, 1927 (Exhibition catalogue ed.). Sydney, NSW: The Macquarie Galleries. OCLC 733840939.
- Burdett, Basil (March 1929). "The recent work of Elioth Gruner". Art in Australia. 3rd series (27). OCLC 223603237.
- MacDonald, James S.; Burdett, Basil (1929). "Australian landscape painters of to-day". Art in Australia. Sydney, NSW. OCLC 219996593.
- Burdett, Basil; Richardson, Henry Handel (1929). "An Australian Trilogy". The Australian Quarterly. 1 (2): 105. doi:10.2307/20628794.
- Moore, John D.; Burdett, Basil; Carter, Norman (October 1933). "John D. Moore's watercolours". Art in Australia. 3rd series (52). Sydney. N.S.W. OCLC 223769111.
- Burdett (1934). The Felton bequests: an historical record, 1904-1933. Melbourne: Felton Bequests Committee.
- Burdett, Basil; Lucke-Meyer, Wilhelm Ludwig (1934). Melbourne by Night. Sydney, NSW: Sydney Ure Smith. OCLC 220931340.
- Burdett, Basil (1935). "An Australian water-colourist". Apollo. ISSN 0003-6536. OCLC 888624580.
- Burdett, Basil; Feint, Adrian (1938). Fine printing in Australia : a typographical debut. Sydney, NSW: Australian Limited Editions Society. OCLC 224640759.
- Burdett, Basil (16 October 1939). Exhibition of French and British contemporary art, in the Town hall, Melbourne (Exhibition catalogue ed.). Melbourne: The Herald (Melbourne) and Art in Australia. OCLC 893156082.
- Burdett, Basil (1942). "A Note on Australian painting". Carnegie magazine. 16 (1). Pittsburgh, PA: Carnegie Institute. OCLC 156775832.
