= Australia: National Journal =

Australian arts and lifestyle magazine (1939–1946)

Australia: National Journal (Note: The apparently clumsy title was laid out on its cover as "AUSTRALIA", subtitled "National Journal" in a much smaller font.) was a monthly arts and lifestyle magazine produced by Sydney Ure Smith's Art in Australia company, and published from July 1939 to October 1946.

== History ==
When the first issue of Australia appeared in newsagents and bookstores, it was advertised as a quarterly publication devoted to "art, literature, architecture, industry and travel", with great attention paid to quality of photography, engraving, and printing. Ure Smith Pty Ltd of Federation House, 166 Phillip Street, Sydney, was already in the business of high-end art printing with its flagship Art in Australia and The Home, a glossy monthly along the lines of Vogue and Harper's Bazaar. A major supporter of the venture was retailer Charles Lloyd Jones, with contributions from R. Haughton James of The Design House, also in Federation House.

In December 1940 Australia: National Journal was relaunched as a smaller, monthly, magazine.

The first issue, "Winter 1939", priced two shillings, featured an article on Pattie Menzies, wife of the prime minister, and articles by Lionel and Norman Lindsay. One critic considered the best articles to be "Decadence and Resurgence" by Lionel Lindsay, and the worst Norman Lindsay's "Modern Business Calls In the Psychologist", which he calls "an extraordinary hotchpotch of false history and philosophy, in which he confuses causes and effects, and lands himself in glaring absurdities", a not-unexpected response from Australia's leading Catholic newspaper. The reviewer also criticised the magazine's lack of a coherent style.

The second issue ("September–October" 1939) included essays on the sculptor Arthur Fleischmann and "The Inside Story of Fashion in Australia".

The fourth issue, which appeared in April 1940, featured an article "Australia in the Air" on the RAAF and "From Little Lamb to Mary" on the wool business.

The June–August 1940 issue had a feature on the Australian Navy at sea and Australian trade in the Netherlands East Indies

The September–November 1940 issue had articles on Post-War reconstruction by B. S. B. Stevens, "The Future of Tropical Australia" by A. H. Lowndes, "Woman and the Factory" by Linda Littlejohn and "The Price of Freedom is Eternal Vigilance" by Sir Herbert Gepp. It also had a story "Ali the Printer" by Ure Smith himself.

December 1940, the first as a slightly cheaper (1s.6d) (Note: Pronounced "one shilling and six pence" or "one and six", it converted in 1966 to 15c, but its equivalent today would be around five dollars.) monthly tabloid magazine, was well received. Contents included a watercolor The Bunyip Hole by Kenneth Macqueen, "Parade of Women" by Marjorie Barnard, "The Cross" by Alan D. Mickle about the famous Sydney district, and another story by Ure Smith.

January 1941 featured an article by Margaret Preston on her trip around Australia and a satirical look at "Society" by Dymphna Cusack.

February 1941 had an article on Australian dress designer, Mavis Ripper, a "Poet's Quiz" by Jean Stanger, and photographs by H. P. Cazneaux, Fleischmann, and a "direct color" cover by Rob Hillier.

- December 1942
- November 1944
- May 1945
- May in June
- July 1945
- July 1945
- August 1945
- September 1945
- January 1946
- June 1946
- August 1946
- September 1946
- October 1946

== Yearbook ==
Perhaps modeled on the English Week-End Book, a number of omnibus issues Australia — Week-end Book were produced in time for Christmas mail to troops overseas

- 1942
- 1943
- 1944
- 1945
- 1946
