= Margaret Preston =

Australian artist (1875–1963)

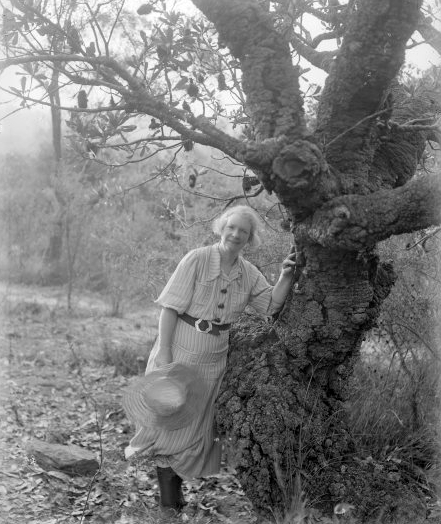
- Margaret Preston outside her home in Berowra, 1936.
- Born: Margaret Rose McPherson; 29 April 1875; Port Adelaide, South Australia, Australia
- Died: 28 May 1963 (aged 88); Mosman, New South Wales, Australia
- Known for: Artworks
- Style: Modernism
- Spouse: William George "Bill" Preston

Margaret Rose Preston (29 April 1875 – 28 May 1963) was an Australian painter, printmaker and writer on art who is regarded as one of Australia's leading modernists of the early 20th century. In her quest to foster an Australian "national art", she was also one of the first non-Indigenous Australian artists to use Aboriginal motifs in her work. Her works are distinctively signed MP.

== Early life ==
Margaret Rose Preston was born on 29 April 1875 in Port Adelaide to David McPherson, a Scottish marine engineer, and Prudence Cleverdon McPherson, née Lyle. She was their first-born child; her sister Ethelwynne Lyle McPherson was born in 1877. The family called Margaret by her middle name (Rose), and it was only in her mid 30s that she began to use Margaret.

Preston's family moved to Sydney in 1885, where Preston attended Fort Street Girls' High School for two years. She showed a very early interest in art, first with china painting and then through private art classes with William Lister Lister. Preston would later, at the age of 52, write about her childhood and developing interest in art in the article "From Eggs to Electrolux," which ran in Sydney Ure Smith's Art in Australia in 1927. Although written in the third person, it offers glimpses of her legendarily strong personality. She describes her first visit to the Art Gallery of New South Wales at the age of 12, recalling it as

"a big, quiet, nice smelling place with a lot of pictures hanging on the walls and here and there students sitting on high stools copying at easels. [My] first impression was not of the beauty of wonder of the pictures, but how nice it must be to sit on a high stool with people giving you 'looks' as they went by... This visit led [me] to the decision to be an artist."

Following her classes with Lister, Preston went on to study at the National Gallery of Victoria Art School under Frederick McCubbin from 1889 to 1894. Her studies were interrupted for a time in 1894–95 by her father's illness and death. When she returned to the school, she began working with Bernard Hall. She showed a strong preference for painting still lifes instead of people, and in 1897, she won the school's Still Life Scholarship, which afforded her a year's free tuition. In 1898, she transferred to Adelaide's School of Design, where she studied under H. P. Gill and Hans Heysen.

== Teaching ==
Early in Preston's career—especially before her marriage—she taught art to help support herself and her family. She began taking on private students while she was still at Adelaide's School of Design, setting up her own studio in 1899. She later taught at St Peter's College and at Presbyterian Ladies' College, both in Adelaide. Among her students were such notable artists as Bessie Davidson, Gladys Reynell, and Stella Bowen, who referred to her as "a red-headed little firebrand of a woman, who was not only an excellent painter, but a most inspiring teacher". Gladys Reynell and Stella Bowen attended her classes in 1908.

== Art career ==
=== Travelling years (1904–1907; 1912) ===
After her mother died in 1903, Preston and Bessie Davidson travelled to Europe, where they stayed from 1904 to 1907, with sojourns in Munich and Paris and shorter trips to Italy, Spain, The Netherlands, and Africa. In Munich, Preston briefly studied at the Government Art School for Women but was not taken with either German teaching methods or German aesthetics. She later commented, "Half of German art is mad and vicious, and a good deal is dull."

Paris suited Preston better, and she took part in the Paris Salon of 1905 and 1906. Her developing Modernist sensibility was influenced by French Postimpressionists such as Paul Cézanne, Paul Gauguin, and Henri Matisse as well as by Japanese art and design, which she encountered at the Musée Guimet. From Japanese art in particular she acquired a preference for asymmetrical composition, a focus on plants as subject matter, and an appreciation of pattern as an organizing method. She began to try to reduce her own work to "decoration without ornamentation".

Returning to Australia in 1907, Preston leased a studio with Bessie Davidson, and they put on a joint exhibition from which one of her paintings Onions (1905), was bought by the National Gallery of South Australia. In 1911, Preston was asked to paint a portrait of Catherine Spence for the National Gallery of South Australia. Preston went back to France (Paris and Brittany) in 1912 with Gladys Reynell, but when World War I broke out, they moved to Great Britain. There, Preston studied pottery and the principles of Modernist design at Roger Fry's Omega Workshops. Later, she and Reynell taught pottery and basket-weaving as therapy for shell-shocked soldiers at the Seale Hayne Military Hospital in Devonshire. She exhibited her work in both London and Paris during this period.

From these European studies, Preston returned to Australia having adopted Modernist principles. The Modernists' analytical approach to design, sense of underlying form, and simplified pictorial space would all become hallmarks of her work. The influence of her European studies can be seen, for example, in her 1927 still life Implement Blue, with its geometric forms, muted palette, and stark lighting.

=== Early Mosman years (1919–1932) ===
In 1919, Preston went to America for an exhibition at the Carnegie Institute in Pittsburgh, Pennsylvania. On her way back to Australia, she met her future husband, William George "Bill" Preston, a recently discharged second lieutenant of the Australian Imperial Force. She married her husband on 31 December 1919, and wrote a false birthdate on her marriage certificate to make herself eight years younger, and so younger than her husband. Bill had a placid temperament that complemented Margaret Preston's assertive personality, and they were devoted to each other throughout their marriage. Preston's friend Leon Gellert noted that Bill seemed to regard it as a national duty to keep his beloved Margaret happy and artistically productive. A successful businessman, Bill Preston was a company director for Anthony Horderns retailers, Dalton's packaging company and later, Tooheys Brewery. Their marriage gave Margaret the financial security to pursue her work and travel extensively.

The Prestons settled in the Sydney suburb of Mosman following their marriage in late December 1919. A harbour-side suburb, Mosman has long attracted artists and writers such as Tom Roberts, Arthur Streeton, Harold Herbert, Dattilo Rubbo, Lloyd Rees, Nancy Borlase, and Ken Done. The Prestons would live in Mosman from 1920 to 1963, with the exception of seven years in the bush suburb of Berowra during the 1930s.

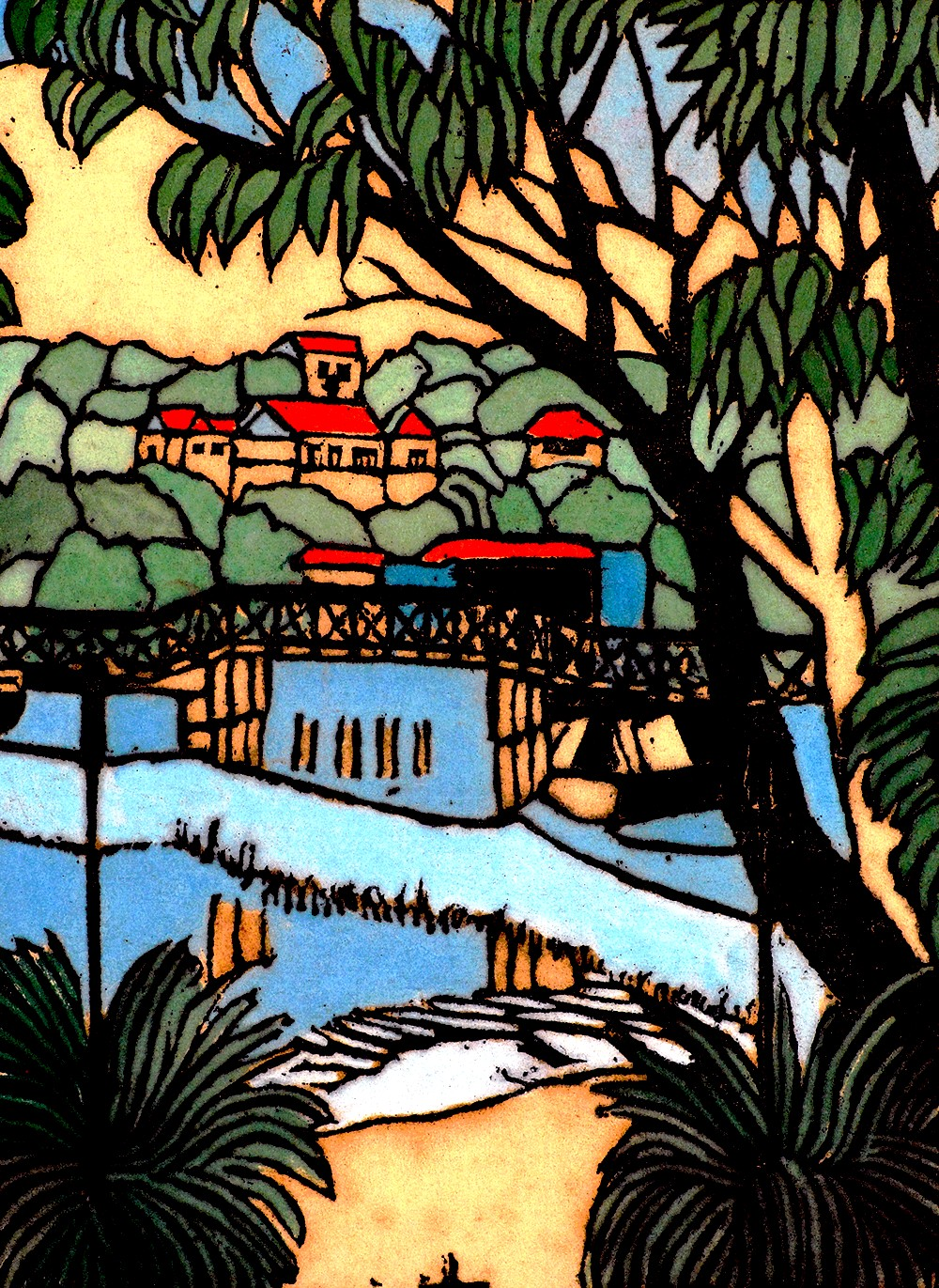
Mosman Bridge 1927

It was during the Mosman period that Preston became established as the most prominent Australian woman artist of the 1920s and 1930s. Within a year of the move to Mosman, the Art Gallery of New South Wales bought her 1915 painting Summer, at the 1920 Royal Art Society Spring exhibition. Preston was a founding member of the Contemporary Group in 1926. In 1929 the trustees of what is now the Art Gallery of New South Wales commissioned Self portrait (1930) – the first such commission to a woman artist from the Gallery. In the 1930s, she joined the Anthropological Society of New South Wales.

Preston joined the Society of Artists and became a friend of its president, Sydney Ure Smith, the influential editor and publisher of Art in Australia, The Home, and Australia: National Journal. Writing in Ure Smith's publications, Preston advocated for her own ideas about Australian art, especially the need to develop a national identity in art rather than endlessly imitating European models. She expressed these ideas in a 1925 article 'The Indigenous Art of Australia' in Art in Australia, illustrated on the cover and accompanying the text with relief prints from indigenous designs, which she praises for their rhythm, adapted from aboriginal shields and taphoglyphs (elsewhere called dendroglyphs; carved wooden grave markers) and which she executed in coloured wool on hessian woolpack, though the article illustrations are her prints;

"In wishing to rid myself of the mannerisms of a country other than my own I have gone to the art of a people who had never seen or known anything different from themselves, and were accustomed always to use the same symbols to express themselves. These are the Australian aboriginals, and it is only from the art of such people in any land that a national art can spring."

All told, she contributed several dozen articles on art to Ure Smith's publications as well as to the Society of Artists yearbooks. Not only did Ure Smith give more space to Preston than to any other artist, he devoted three issues to her work exclusively: the Margaret Preston Number of Art in Australia (1927), Recent Paintings by Margaret Preston (1929), and Margaret Preston's Monotypes (1949).

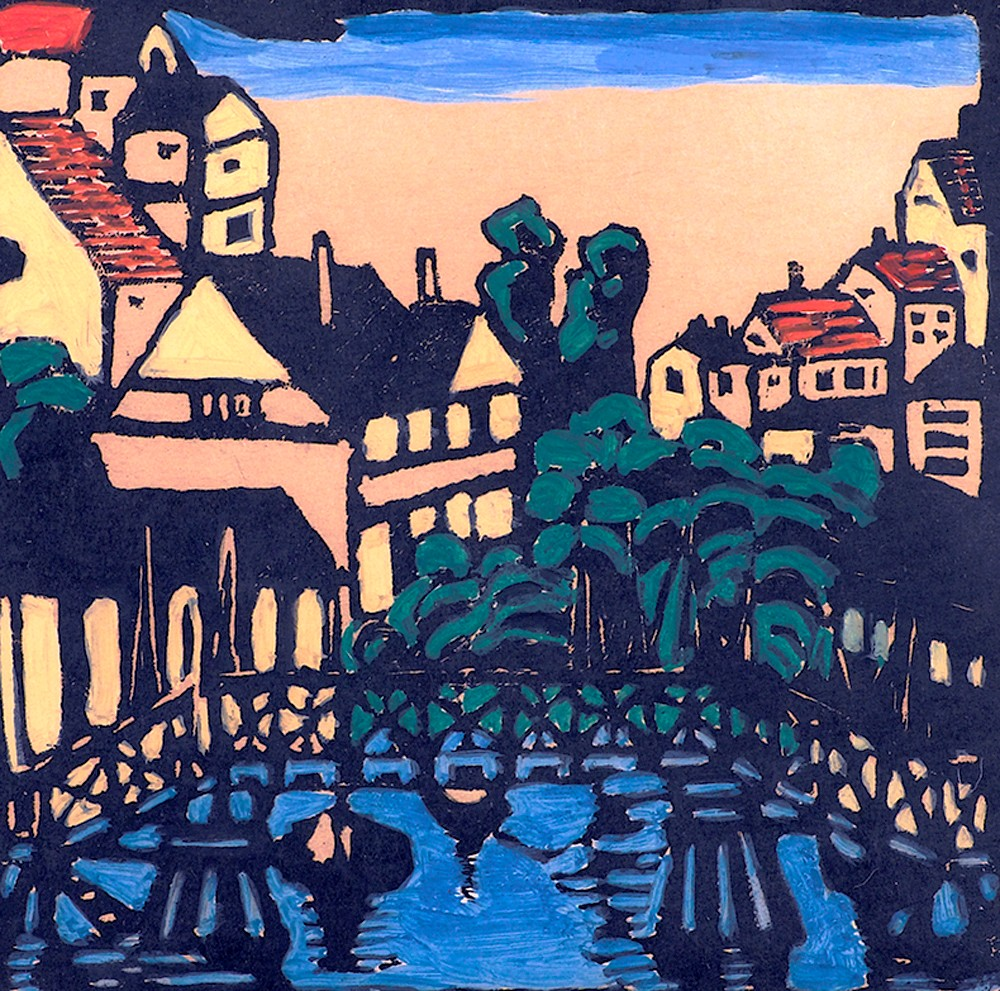
Wooden Bridge 1925

Preston also capitalized on the forum that women's magazines provided in allowing her to reach a wide audience for both her work and her opinions on the future of Australian art. Readers of the April 1929 edition of Woman's World were prodded to keep the covers of issues on which Preston's works had been reproduced and to frame them as pictures.

==== Prints ====
Even more than her paintings, Preston's woodcuts, linocuts, and monotypes show her capacity for Modernist innovation. Although she had experimented with etching while living in England, the best of her mature work was in woodcuts. These prints were inexpensive to produce and helped her to extend her reach to a broader market.

Preston created over 400 known prints, not all of which are documented and some of which are lost. The great majority of surviving prints feature Australian native flora as their subjects, a result of Preston's desire to make uniquely Australian images. Flowers such as the banksia, waratah, gum blossom and wheelflower offered Preston specimens for her radical, asymmetrical compositions.

Mosman and its environs also featured in many of Preston's prints. One of the Prestons' flats (in Musgrave Street) afforded views of Mosman Bay and Mosman Bridge that turned up in more than half a dozen different prints. Another flat, near Reid Park, had views of Sydney Harbor and its foreshore that featured in such iconic works as Sydney Head I (1925), Sydney Head II (1925), and Harbour Foreshore (1925). The harbour also appears in the works Circular Quay (1925) and The Bridge from the North Shore (1932). There are also prints with landscape subjects, such as Red Cross Fete (1920)—a view across the water from Balmoral Island at night—and Edwards Beach Balmoral (1929) and Rocks and Waves (1929), which are both views from Wyargine Point near Edwards Beach.

Preston liked to experiment with new techniques, although her most usual approach was to print her images in black with added hand colouring. She felt that printmaking helped to keep her work fresh, writing: "Whenever I thought I was slipping in my art, I went into crafts–woodcuts, monotypes, stencils and etchings. I find it clears my brain."

==== Paintings ====
Mosman also features in many Preston paintings that are not still life works. Two in particular—Japanese Submarine Exhibition (1942) and Children's Corner at the Zoo (1944–46)—are painted in a deliberately naive style, reflecting a then-current interest in children's art. Preston would probably have seen a 1939 Department of Education Gallery exhibition of children's art, and she would have been aware of Roger Fry's theories on creativity and learning in children. Japanese Submarine Exhibition offers a wry look at that paranoia and anti-Japanese sentiments of the war years in Australia.

=== Berowra years (1932–1939) ===
Between 1932 and 1939, the Prestons lived in the bush suburb of Berowra. While living in Berowra, the Prestons had two terrier dogs. It was here that Preston pursued most intensively her concern for the development of a national identity in Australian art. She continued her adaptations of Australian Indigenous art, deploying Aboriginal design motifs and natural-pigment colour schemes in her work. This tendency continued even after she left Berowra and can be seen in such later works such as The Brown Pot (1940) and Manly Pines (1953). Preston won a silver medal at the Exposition Internationale, Paris in 1937, and that year became a foundation member of, and exhibited with, Robert Menzies' anti-modernist organisation, the Australian Academy of Art.

=== Return to Mosman (1939–1963) ===
Following their seven years in Berowra, the Prestons returned to Mosman, where they would stay until Margaret Preston's death on 28 May 1963. Among their homes during this period were the former home of actress Nellie Stewart and the Hotel Mosman. Preston's later works built on the Aboriginal themes developed at Berowra, and her very last works had overtly religious themes, possibly in response to the Blake Prize instituted in 1951. In the 1950s, she made a series of gouache stencils based on religious subjects.

== Collections and exhibitions ==
A retrospective at the National Gallery of Australia, Margaret Preston, Australian printmaker, (December 2004 to April 2005), presented some of the gallery's large collection of etchings, woodcuts, masonite cuts, monotypes and stencils by the artist. Other galleries that hold collections of her work include the Queensland Art Gallery, the Tasmanian Museum and Art Gallery, the Art Gallery of South Australia, and the National Gallery of Victoria.

In 2012, several works by Preston were included by curator Carolyn Christov-Bakargiev in documenta (13), Kassel, Germany.

In 2024, Geelong Gallery presented an exhibition examining the influence of ukiyo-e on Cressida Campbell and Preston. The exhibition took its lead from Geelong Gallery’s significant print holdings, chiefly Margaret Preston’s hand-coloured woodcut Fuchsia and balsam 1928 (purchased in 1982).

In 2025, works by Preston featured in the Dangerously Modern: Australian Women Artists in Europe 1890-1940 exhibition at the Art Gallery of South Australia.

== In popular culture ==
A Margaret Preston painting figures in “Raisins and Almonds”, S1:E5 of Miss Fisher's Murder Mysteries (2012).

== See also ==
- Australian art
