= Collingridge =

Collingridge is an English surname. Notable people with the same surname are:

- Arthur Collingridge (1853–1907), Australian painter, brother of George Collingridge
- Peter Collingridge (1757–1829), English Roman Catholic bishop
- George Collingridge (1847–1931), Australian writer
- Gordon Collingridge (active 1922–1928), Australian actor
- Graham Collingridge (born 1955), British neuroscientist
- Vanessa Collingridge (born 1968), English author and broadcaster
