= 1939 Herald Exhibition of French and British Contemporary Art =

Influential 1939 exhibition of European art that toured Australia

The Herald Exhibition of French and British Contemporary Art (1939–1945) is recognised as momentous in Australian art history. Launched in October 1939, as the Second World War began, the curator was critic and journalist Basil Burdett and the organising body and sponsor, the Melbourne Herald newspaper, under its managing director Keith Murdoch. The exhibition was seen widely in a series of shows across the eastern states and took place during, and in opposition to, efforts to establish the Australian Academy of Art, a conservative Australian government-authorised art organisation which operated from 1937 to 1946 and staged annual exhibitions.

== Conception ==
Murdoch argued, in convincing the Board of the Herald newspaper to finance an exhibition of European modern art, that "Gallipoli had given us one kind of maturity. A great Herald exhibition of contemporary French and British art would give us another kind of maturity."

Basil Burdett, who in 1925 established Macquarie Galleries at 19 Bligh Street Sydney, and was a frequent contributor and associate editor of the magazine Art in Australia in the mid-to-late 1920s, had spent the early months of 1939 travelling through Europe selecting the works. His dispatches, written in the manner of a flâneur, which he wrote for the Herald, the Adelaide Advertiser, and the Sydney Daily Telegraph prepared the ground and framed the exhibition as the art of a free, humane School of Paris set explicitly against rising fascism and the influence of the German painting school in Melbourne at the National Gallery School. The Herald promoted the idea that there was a ready audience: "in Australia there has sprung up, among a wide public as well as among our artists, a very keen and lively interest in the developments of modern art." The Sun declared its purpose "to show the development of modern art since the era of impressionism, beginning with Cezanne, whose work will be featured because 1939 is the centenary of his birth."

== The exhibition ==
=== Tour ===
The exhibition opened at Melbourne Town Hall on 16 October 1939, before travelling to Adelaide—where it was opened by the state Governor at the South Australian Gallery—and to Sydney, where, significantly, it was housed not in a public gallery but in the department store David Jones. The Art Gallery of New South Wales did, however, store the works during the war years. Selections from the exhibition were shown in Melbourne, Sydney, Hobart, Launceston and Brisbane until 1945. Suffering from jaundice, Burdett was not able to oversee the Melbourne showing, and then did not see these later extensions of the tour because, while serving in the Australian Red Cross Field Force from 15 January 1941, he was killed in a plane crash at Sourabaya, Java on 1 February 1942.

=== Works featured ===
The exhibition comprised 215 paintings and sculptures within four categories: French Painting, French Sculpture, British Painting (which included two Australians), and British Sculpture. The works were loaned from important collections; of the Louvre, the Musée du Luxembourg, Les musées de la Ville de Paris, MoMA New York, the Courtauld Institute, the Tate Gallery, and the Glasgow Gallery, alongside those from major private collectors and dealers including Wildensteins, Arthur Tooth & Sons, The Redfern Gallery, and Reid & Lefèvre. Advisers and lenders included Kenneth Clark and Sir John Rothenstein.

=== Artists ===
Artists included European painters André Bauchant, Pierre Bonnard, Georges Braque, Maurice Brianchon, Christian Hugues Caillard, Jules Cavaillès, Edmond Céria, Paul Cézanne, Marc Chagall, Giorgio de Chirico, Salvador Dalí, André Derain, Roger de La Fresnaye, Charles Dufresne, Raoul Dufy, Max Ernst, Orthon Friesz, Paul Gauguin, Juan Gris, Marcel Grommaire, Georges Kars, Marie Laurencin, Max Laeuger, Maximilien Luce, Jacques Limousin, Jean Lurçat, Pierre Laprade, Henri Manguin, Albert Marquet, Henri Matisse, Adolphe Milich, Amadeo Modigliani, Roland Oudot, Jules Pascin, Pablo Picasso, Maurice Poncelet, Valentine Prax, Odilon Redon, Georges Rouault, André Dunoyer de Segonzac, Georges Seurat, Paul Signac, Chaim Soutine, Henri de Toulouse-Lautrec, Vincent Van Gogh, Maurice Utrillo, Suzanne Valadon, Félix Vallotton, Kees van Dongen, Maurice de Vlaminck, Édouard Vuillard, and Henri de Waroquier, with sculptures by Charles Despiau, Aristide Malliol, Ossip Zadkine and the British Jacob Epstein, Maurice Lambert and Frank Dobson, and British painters including Augustus John, the Nash brothers, Stanley Spencer, Mathew Smith, Walter Sickert, Philip Wilson Steer, Graham Sutherland, Henry Tonks, and Edward Wadsworth. There were two Australian-born painters, John Joseph Wardell Power (catalogued as John William Power) and Derwent Lees.

== Catalogue ==
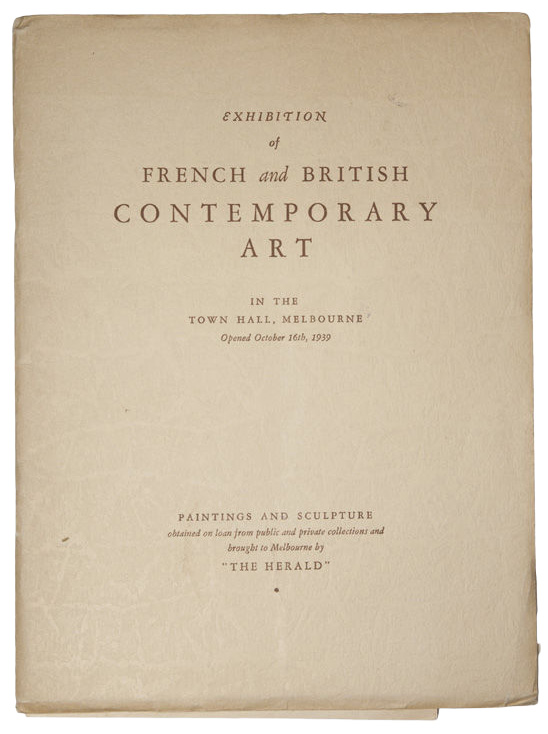
Cover of the catalogue of the 1939 Herald Exhibition of French and British Contemporary Art

The exhibition's catalogue was purposeful and austere—its cover printed in dark burgundy on cream card, a sole illustrated frontispiece being Cézanne's Cour d’une ferme, lent by the Louvre from the celebrated Caillebotte Collection, and containing thirteen monochrome illustrations and brief, unpretentious notes on each artist listed alphabetically within the four categories, with no dimensions or dates of execution of their works provided, and presented in a populist tone: enquiries about purchasing works could be made at the desk.

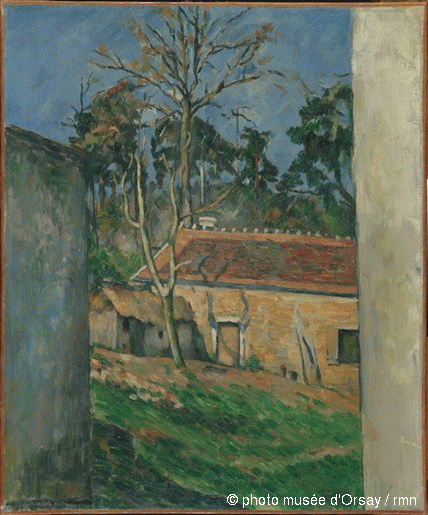
Paul Cézanne (1879) Cour d'une ferme, oil on canvas 630 mm x 520 mm.Musée d'Orsay

This accessibility was strategic; as Murdoch's introductory essay argued, contact with great art would exert a moral and intellectual force through Australian culture. In a city with one major public gallery and a culture still heavily shaped by the institutional conservatism of two world wars, staging the show at the Town Hall—and in Sydney at a department store—was itself a democratic gesture, and it worked: general members of the public queued to attend in Melbourne, not solely the usual art-world cognoscenti.

== Impact ==
For Australian audiences, seeing original modernist works was formative. McCulloch notes that:

it created an unprecedented furore in both Melbourne and Sydney, where the conflict between academics and moderns had already reached a climax. The final result of the exhibition was that, like the Armory Show in NY (1913), or Roger Fry's Manet and the Post-Impressionists (1910) at the Grafton Galleries, London, it had a major impact on the reception and development of modernism in Australia. About 20 of the pictures were sold locally and the rest returned to Europe after the war.

Pugh notes that the Art Gallery of New South Wales had, at the time, been reduced to displaying photographic prints of European works because originals were simply beyond reach. A 1931 Herald-sponsored exhibition had offered only colour reproductions of French paintings. Though no German Expressionists, no Russian Constructivists, nor Italian Futurists and few Surrealists were displayed, for many visitors, this was their first direct encounter with canonical modern art, and artists who attended, among them John Brack, Lloyd Rees, Sibyl Craig, Joy Hester, Albert Tucker, Sidney Nolan, and James Gleeson, later spoke of a visceral, physical experience of seeing the actual works.

The exhibition landed at a pivotal moment in the Australian art world's internal debate between the entrenched realist tonalism or impressionism of what was called the ‘gum tree school’ and the advocates of Modernism, significant among them being Adrian Lawlor, who had been pushing for recognition in institutions still largely controlled by traditionalists. The outbreak of war effectively prolonged that conservative hold—demobilisation, Cold War anxiety, and cultural regulation dampened the modernist cause for years afterward—hence the almost mythologised memory of the 1939 exhibition for those active in shaping the postwar Australian art world. It represented a brief, luminous moment of openness before things closed down.

=== Reaction ===
McQueen exemplifies the conservative reaction in Lionel Lindsay's assertion in his 1942 diatribe Addled Art, that art, for the sake of civilisation, must be defended against "the mob's invasion" in the form of the Modernists who had adopted "the tactics of the international Communists [to] corrupt, undermine, flatter the groundlings; but put the boot in...to kick the stuffing out of aristocrat Drawing." Their "ugliness, deformation, and discord" opposed beauty, truth and harmony: "Surrealism was acquiring a leading place in Australian Modernism, largely as a response to the irrationality of war. Lindsay recognised this and concentrated upon Dali's 1932 L’homme fleur [a.k.a. Memory of the child-woman], which had attracted the largest crowds at the 1939 Herald exhibition because "things in decay attract the flies."

Chanin and Miller note that even "Australian artists and patrons who were sympathetic to Modernism were by no means united. Adelaide poet Max Harris wrote about the dangerous elements within the modern movement', having in mind his colleague, the Melbourne artist and writer Adrian Lawlor. Lawlor wrote favourably about abstract and Expressionist art, but initially rejected Surrealism. Clive Turnbull, another 'spokesman' for the modern movement, lauded Picasso and Braque but dismissed Gris. Basil Burdett, the curator of the Herald exhibition, held an ambivalent attitude towards some of the principal supporters of Australian Modernism, such as John and Sunday Reed and the critics Peter Bellew and Adrian Lawlor. He agreed with close friend Lionel Lindsay that the activities of the Australian Modernist camp could be read as the antics of attention seekers: either of high-spirited youth or of a more calculated play for notoriety."

Australian artist A.M.E. Bale, a typical member of conservative art organisations the Victorian Artists' Society, the Australian Art Association, Melbourne Society of Women Painters, and the Twenty Melbourne Painters Society, was vehement in her distaste for anything 'modern,' and echoed the views of then National Gallery of Victoria director and former Herald art critic, James S. MacDonald who, of the 1939 Herald exhibition proclaimed: 'They are exceedingly wretched paintings ... putrid meat ... the product of degenerates and perverts ... filth'. A consequence of MacDonald's retrograde attitudes was the Gallery trustees recommending in 1940 against his reappointment and he was effectively dismissed in 1941.

In October 1941, when the Contemporary Art Society held its Third Annual Exhibition at Melbourne's newly built Art Deco Hotel Australia in Collins Street, representational paintings, even those post-impressionist in style, were rejected as the Society allied itself to experimental modernism. The show signalled the public emergence of an Australian modernist movement.

That the exhibition developed a mythological status is consequential; it had been so thoroughly marketed, and so emotionally invested with the circumstances of the time, that personal and public memory fused; paintings people recalled as in the show prove not always to be what was actually there.

== See also ==
- Degenerates and Perverts, a key text about the exhibition
