= Collindridge =

Collindridge is a surname. Notable people with the surname include:

- Colin Collindridge (1920–2019), British footballer
- Frank Collindridge (1891–1951), British politician
- Fred Collindridge (1899–1969), British trade union leader

== See also ==
- Collingridge
