= Degenerates and Perverts =

2005 book by Eileen Chanin and Steven Miller

- Author: Eileen Chanin; Steven Miller
- Language: English
- Genre: Non-fiction
- Publisher: Miegunyah Press
- Publication date: 2005

Degenerates and Perverts is an art history book written by Eileen Chanin and Steven Miller, published in 2005. It is about the 1939 Herald Exhibition of French and British Contemporary Art, a groundbreaking exhibition of contemporary art which stayed in Australia throughout the Second World War. This exhibition included works by masters such as Picasso and Van Gogh, available at bargain war-time prices. It has been regarded as a missed opportunity for Australia to establish a world-class art collection. The book includes reproductions of many of the artworks, and discusses the story of the exhibition and the myths which have grown up around it.

Degenerates and Perverts was published by the Miegunyah Press (an imprint of Melbourne University Press) in 2005, and included an introductory essay by Judith Pugh. The book won the NSW History Awards and was shortlisted for the Victorian Premier's Literary Award.

The title comes from a comment by art gallery director James Stuart MacDonald that modern art was "the work of degenerates and perverts".
