= Alcaston House =

Historic building in Melbourne, Australia

Coordinates: 37°48′47″S 144°58′25″E

- Interactive map of the Alcaston House area

General information
- Year built: 1929-1930

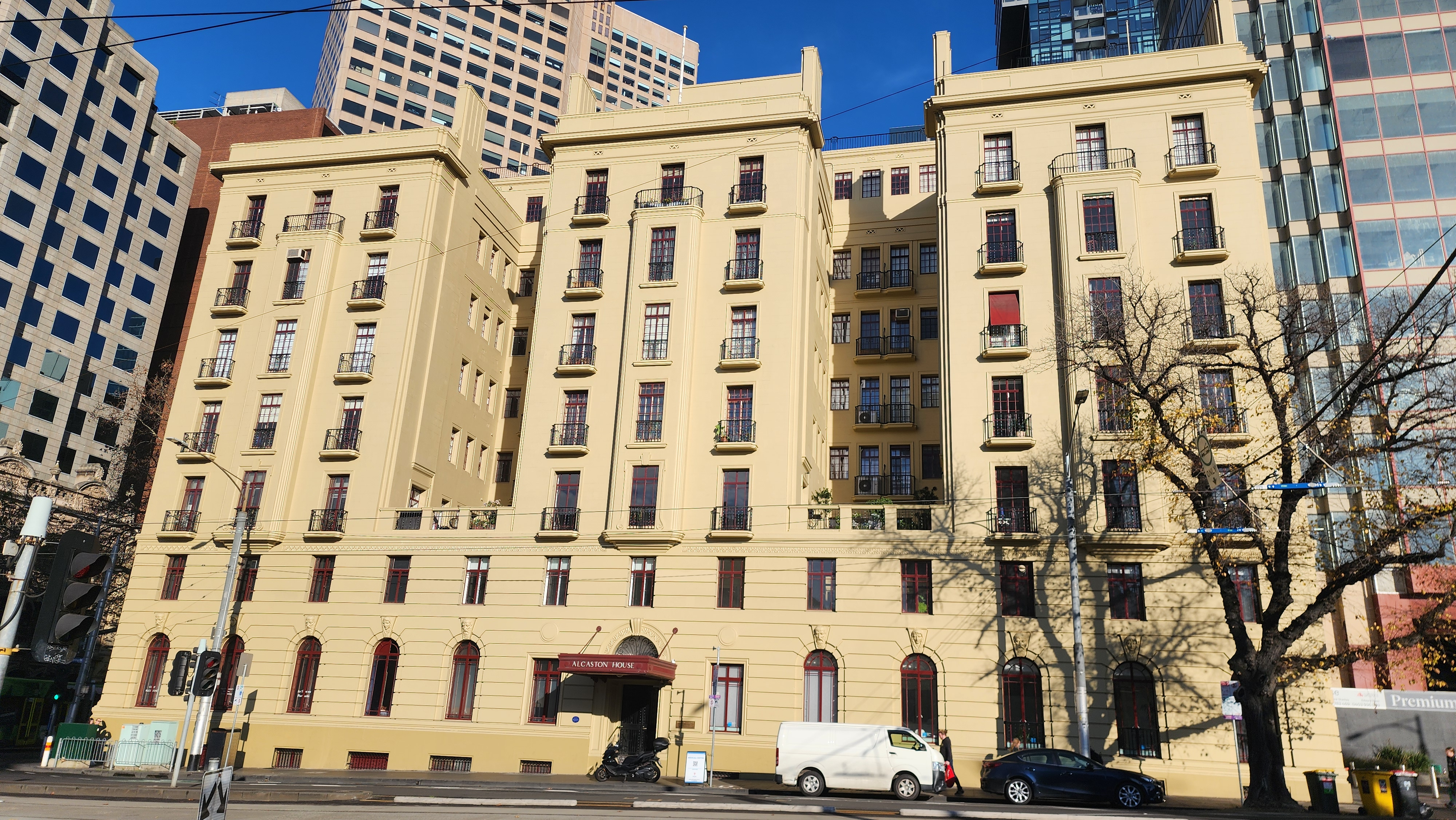

Alcaston House, located on the corner of Melbourne's Collins and Spring St, rises seven levels over a basement, and is one Melbourne's first mixed-use Art Deco buildings. It was designed by the firm of architects, A. and K. Henderson and erected by T Donald and Co. in 1929-30. The Renaissance Revival complex was erected for the trustees of Dr EM James, whose home previously occupied the land. Located at 2 Collins St, Melbourne; it is an early example of multi-storey residential accommodation in the city at a time when the post-war preference for flat living in Europe and the USA was becoming manifest in Australia. The art deco building is directly opposite the Old Treasury Building and Victoria's Parliament Building.

== Historical significance ==
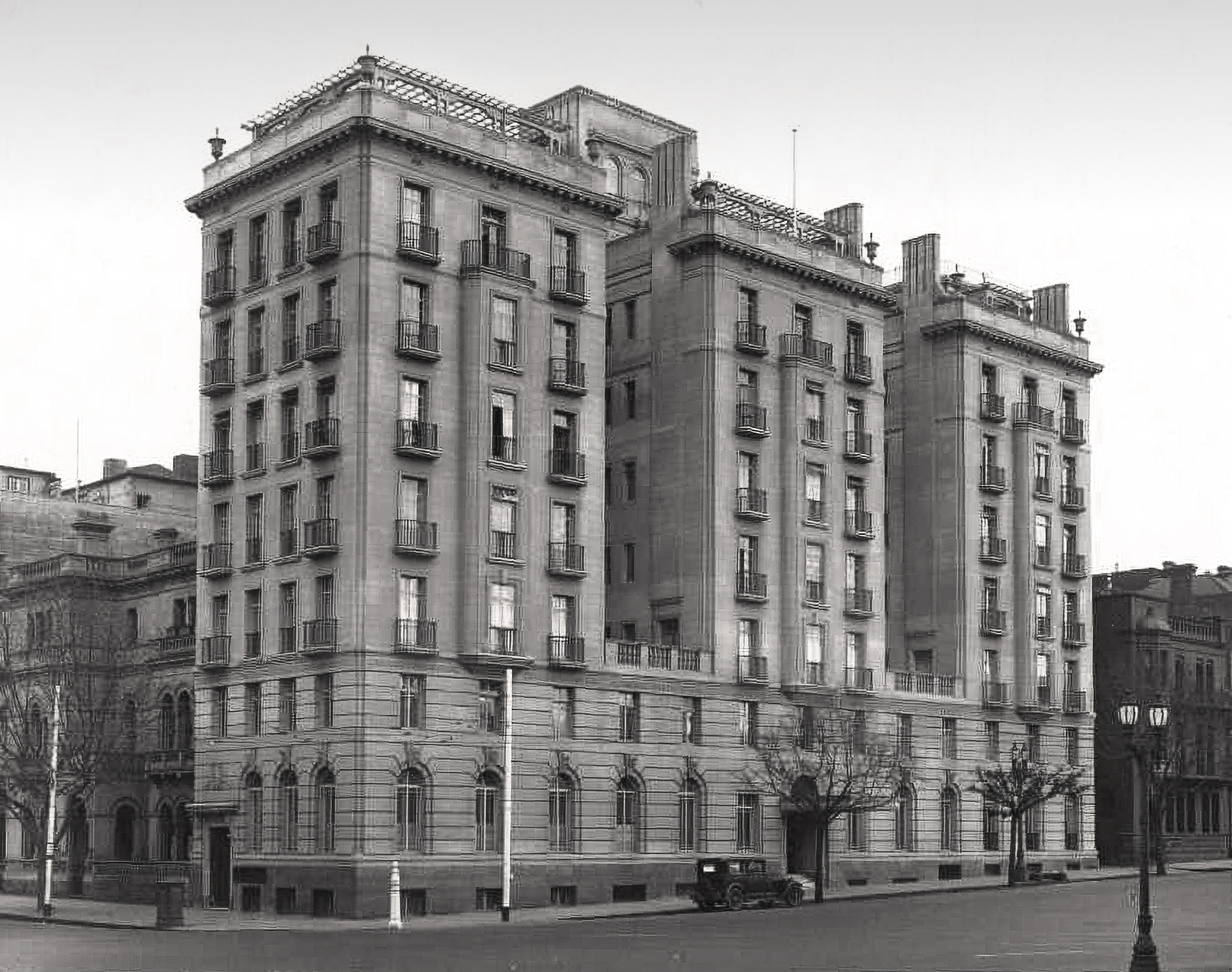
Alcaston House, Melbourne soon after construction in 1930

Alcaston House is of historical significance as a reminder of the professional character of the top end of Collins Street in the early decades of this century, a character that persists today, due in no small part to Alcaston House and its professional rooms. Designed to house medicos' suites, the entrance was wheel-chair accessible via gentle ramp from street level, and piped heating was specially 'washed'. Alcaston House has played an important role in the history of the medical profession in Melbourne.

Alcaston House is of architectural significance for its combination of Renaissance Revival motifs within an essentially "modern" framework and for the way in which its design expresses its mixed uses. The use of detailing such as the smooth rustication and round-headed windows and the colour of the main structure complement the other buildings in this important precinct, especially the Old Treasury. A & K Henderson were responsible for, amongst other things, the T&G Building, the first major building in Melbourne to reach the 132-foot height limit and raise a tower above it as an architectural feature.

In addition to its urbane facade, it was the roof garden of Alcaston House that received much attention on the building's completion. The roof had pergolas over which vines grew. Elsewhere, planters of geraniums and zinnias were used to decorate the roof garden. stacks. The timber pergolas that shaded the roof garden and the urns on the parapet have since been removed.

== Aesthetic significance ==
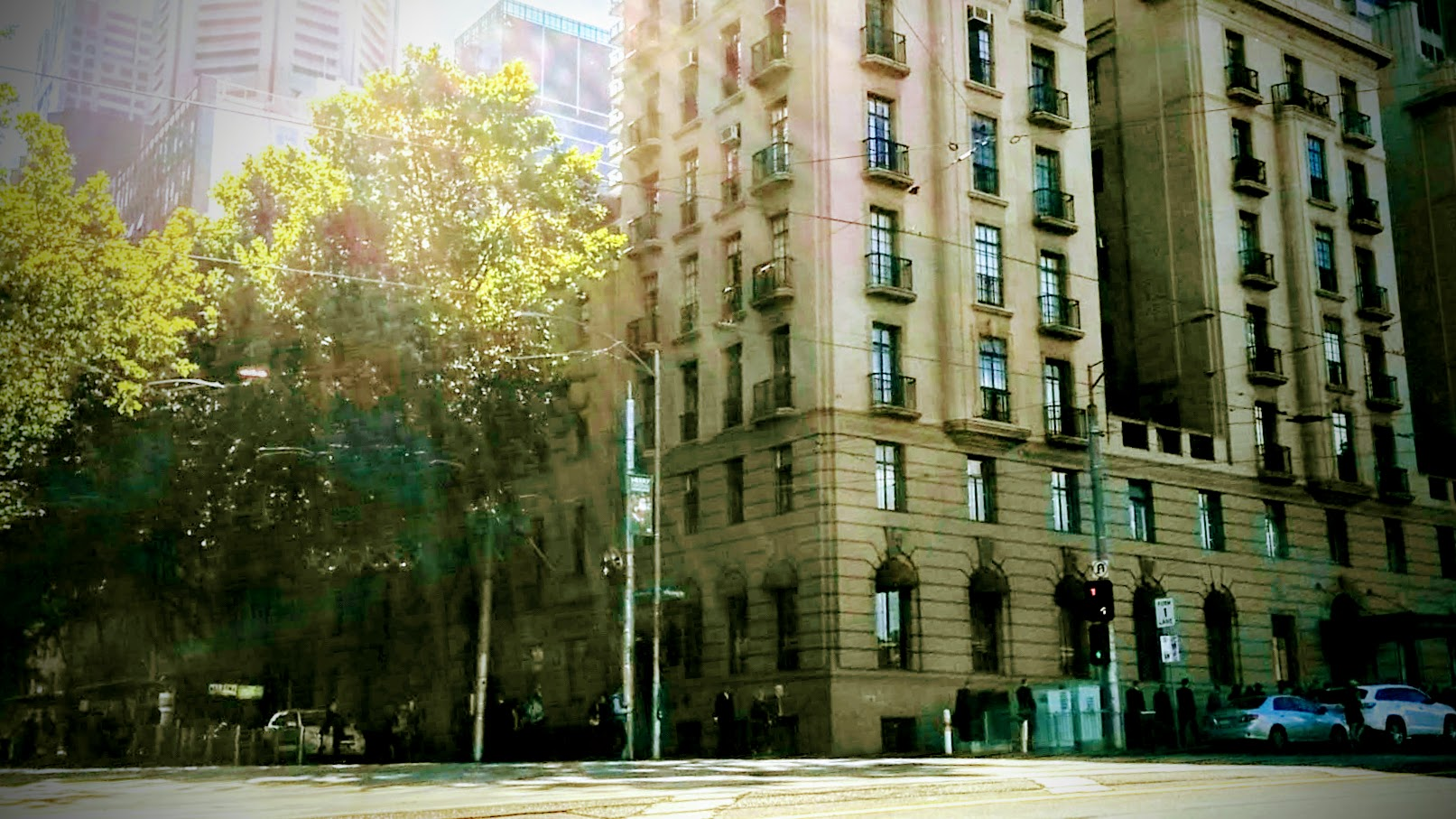

Collins Street East has aesthetic significance for: the distinctive, pre 1956 streetscapes; the views to the landmark Town Hall tower and church spires; the ambience created within the footpath zone by the aged arching street trees, discrete building entrances, and uncluttered shop fronts; and the terminal view to the Old Treasury building. The building was constructed during the inter-war period and contains offices and converted dwellings on the upper floors.

== Previous inhabitants ==
Basil Burdett (1897-1942), art critic, Violet Cynthia Reed Nolan (1908–1976), art critic and gallerist, Maie Casey aviator, wife of parliamentarian Richard Casey; and Honorary Consul to Monaco Andrew Cannon.

== Current inhabitants ==
Today its strata units are occupied by a variety of health professionals (general surgery, endocrinology, neurology, dentistry), law firms and permanent residents.
