= Lionel Lindsay =

Australian 20th century artist

Sir Lionel Arthur Lindsay
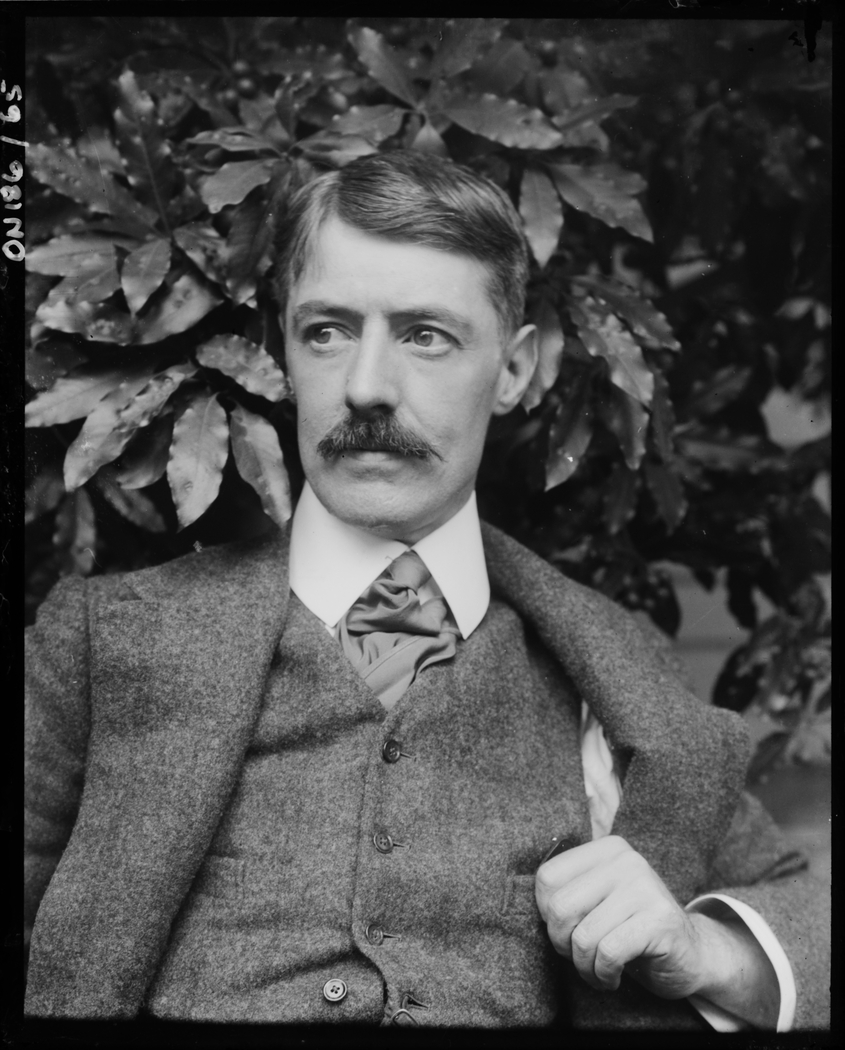
- Lionel Lindsay c. 1902
- Born: Lionel Arthur Lindsay; 17 October 1874; Creswick, Colony of Victoria
- Died: 22 May 1961 (aged 86); Hornsby, NSW, Australia
- Occupation: Artist
- Spouse: Jane Ann (Jean) Dyson
- Children: Peter Lindsay (son) Jean Charley (daughter)
- Relatives: Percy (brother); Robert (brother); Mary (sister); Norman (brother); Pearl (sister); Reg (brother); Daryl (brother); Ruby (sister); Isabel (sister)

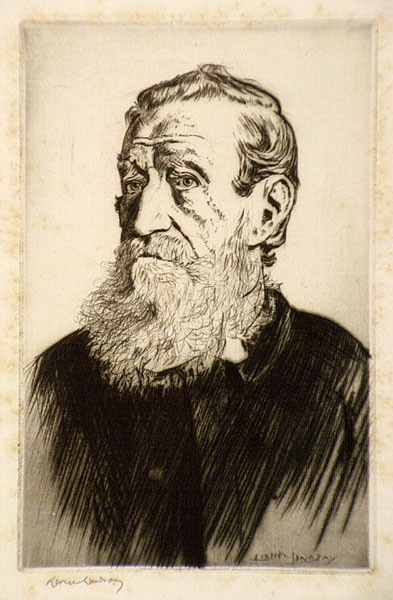
Etching of Thomas Williams, missionary to Fiji' (1831)

Sir Lionel Arthur Lindsay (17 October 1874 – 22 May 1961) was an Australian artist and art critic, and one of a notable Australian family of artists; Percival Charles Lindsay, Norman Alfred Lindsay, Ruby Lindsay and Ernest Daryl Lindsay. Lionel Lindsay was known for his prints, paintings which he exhibited nationally and internationally from the early 1900s until his death. A critic, he was a staunch defender of traditional, realist, art and opposed Modernism through his publication Addled Art, and influential positions on a number of arts organisations, including the Society of Artists; the Australian Printer-Etchers' Society (founding president 1921; the Australian Academy of Art; and Trustee of the Art Gallery of New South Wales (1918–1929 and 1934–1949).

== Early life ==
Lionel Lindsay was born in the Victorian goldfields town of Creswick, the third child of the Irish immigrant, Dr Robert Charles Lindsay, and his wife Jane. It was a creative family, as four of their ten children became professional artists. Jane Lindsay was an amateur artist, and encouraged all her children to draw as a way of occupying their time and energy. Her father, Thomas Williams, took an active interest in the children’s lives. When the 15 year old Lionel expressed an interest in becoming an astronomer Williams arranged for the boy to become a pupil astronomer under Pietro Baracchi.

The transition to Melbourne meant he had to board with one of his uncles, an experience he did not enjoy. This in turn led to him spending as much time as possible in the Melbourne Publc Library where he discovered a world of books, and Charles Keene’s illustrations in Punch magazine. After he found he lacked the ability to undertake the advanced mathematics needed for hunting the stars, he returned to Creswick and attempted to study for matriculation.

In 1891 a troupe of actors visited Creswick. Lionel drew their performance, and gave the result to them. After one of his drawings was published he returned to Melbourne, initially staying with a different uncle, and became a freelance illustrator.

He was joined in time by his brothers, Percy and Norman. Their life at this time is best described in Norman Lindsay’s novel, A Curate in Bohemia. His companions included the poet Hugh McCrae and the three Dyson brothers: Will (called Bill by the family), Ted and Ambrose.

In 1902 Lionel saw a travelling production of Bizet’s Carmen. He became obsessed with the idea of travelling to Spain, so he could create an illustrated text. He learnt Spanish from a local corkcutter and travelled to Seville. A love of Spain and things Spanish remained with him for the rest of his life.

After an illness he travelled to London, and then to Italy. Here he met again with Jean Dyson, the sister of his friends and “tumbled into love”.

== Career ==
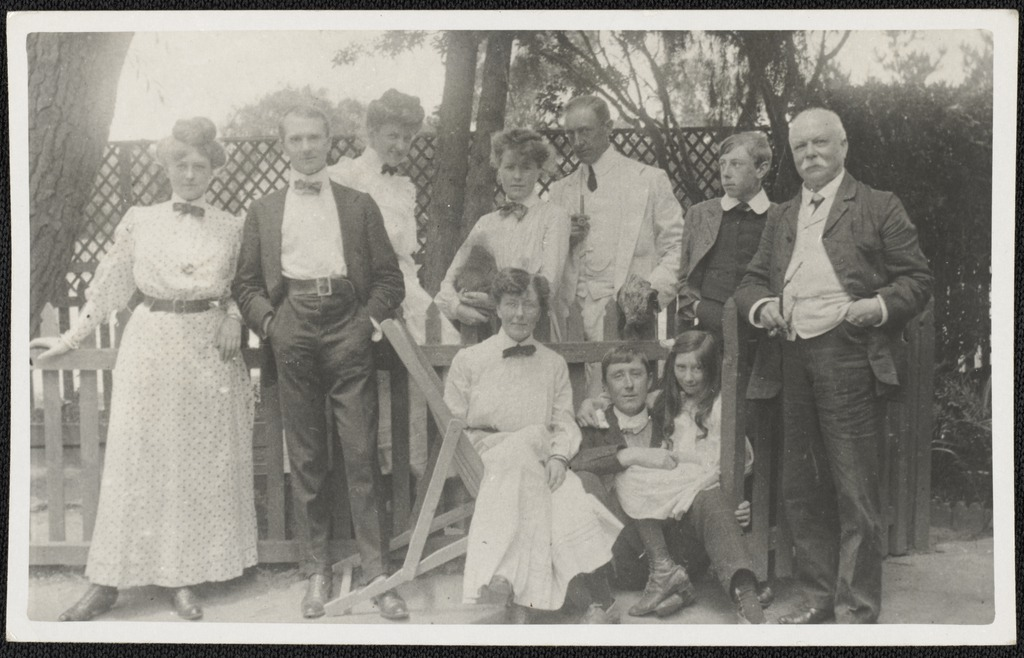
Portrait of the Lindsay family, ca. 1900 (6173408441)

Lionel Lindsay constantly experimented in ways of making art. In Melbourne in the 1890s he became an adept photographer, and most photographic records of his family and his bohemian friends were taken by him.

He had long admired the etchings in the collection of the National Gallery of Victoria, but assumed the technique was not possible in Australia. When he saw that a local artist, John Shirlow, had begun to make etchings, Lindsay taught himself to do the same. He adapted an old knife polishing machine to print the small plates.

In 1899 after the death of their friend Ernest Moffitt, Lionel wrote the first monograph on an Australian artist, A Consideration of the Art of Ernest Moffitt. Norman Lindsay made the woodcuts for the cover and the publication was funded by their mutual friend, the composer Marshall-Hall.

For many years Lionel Lindsay combined his career as an artist with a paid position as an illustrator. After he returned to Australia he and Jean settled in Sydney, to be close to his brother, Norman. At Will Dyson’s suggestion he approached Banjo Paterson, then editor of the Evening News, to become its regular cartoonist. He remained with the paper until 1925.

In Sydney he continued to make etchings. In London he had seen an exhibition of Charles Meryon’s prints of old Paris, so in Sydney gave a similar romantic treatment of the “slums” of the Rocks. In 1910 Lionel, Jean and their two children moved to a “servantless house” designed by William Hardy Wilson, which Lionel named “Meryon”.

When his friend, and fellow etcher, Sydney Ure Smith, founded Art in Australia in 1916 Lionel Lindsay became a regular contributor. He also contributed to Art in Australia’s series of monographs on Australian artists. In 1918, when Lionel wrote the text for Norman Lindsay’s Pen Drawings, he called his brother a “genius”.

Lionel Lindsay’s prints of old Sydney brought him to the attention of the philanthropist and collector, William Dixson who, after buying all his early prints, then came to an arrangement to buy a copy of every state of all future prints. As a result, the Dixson Library in the State Library of NSW has the largest single collection of Lionel Lindsay’s oeuvre. Dixson also paid for Lionel Lindsay to write the first monograph on the colonial artist, Conrad Martens.

A special issue of Art in Australia devoted to printmaking brought Lionel Lindsay’s work to the attention of Harold Wright of the London dealer Colnaghi. In 1925 Wright wrote to Lindsay, praising his work, especially his wood engravings. Lionel made immediate plans to resign from his job at the Evening News, and travel to London.

In 1927 Lionel Lindsay exhibited the etchings he had made in Spain, Italy and France. These had been printed with Colnaghi’s master printmakers. They became one of the top selling exhibitions of the year. In less than a week he sold £1500 worth of prints.

Lionel Lindsay’s lifelong friendship with Harold Wright is recorded in their letters, held in the manuscripts collection of the Mitchell Library. They show how Wright enabled Lindsay, who was a Gallery trustee, to create the small but significant collection of old master prints for the Art Gallery of NSW. They also describe his hostility to modern art and his reasons for voting for William Dobell to be awarded the controversial Archibald Prize for his portrait of Joshua Smith.

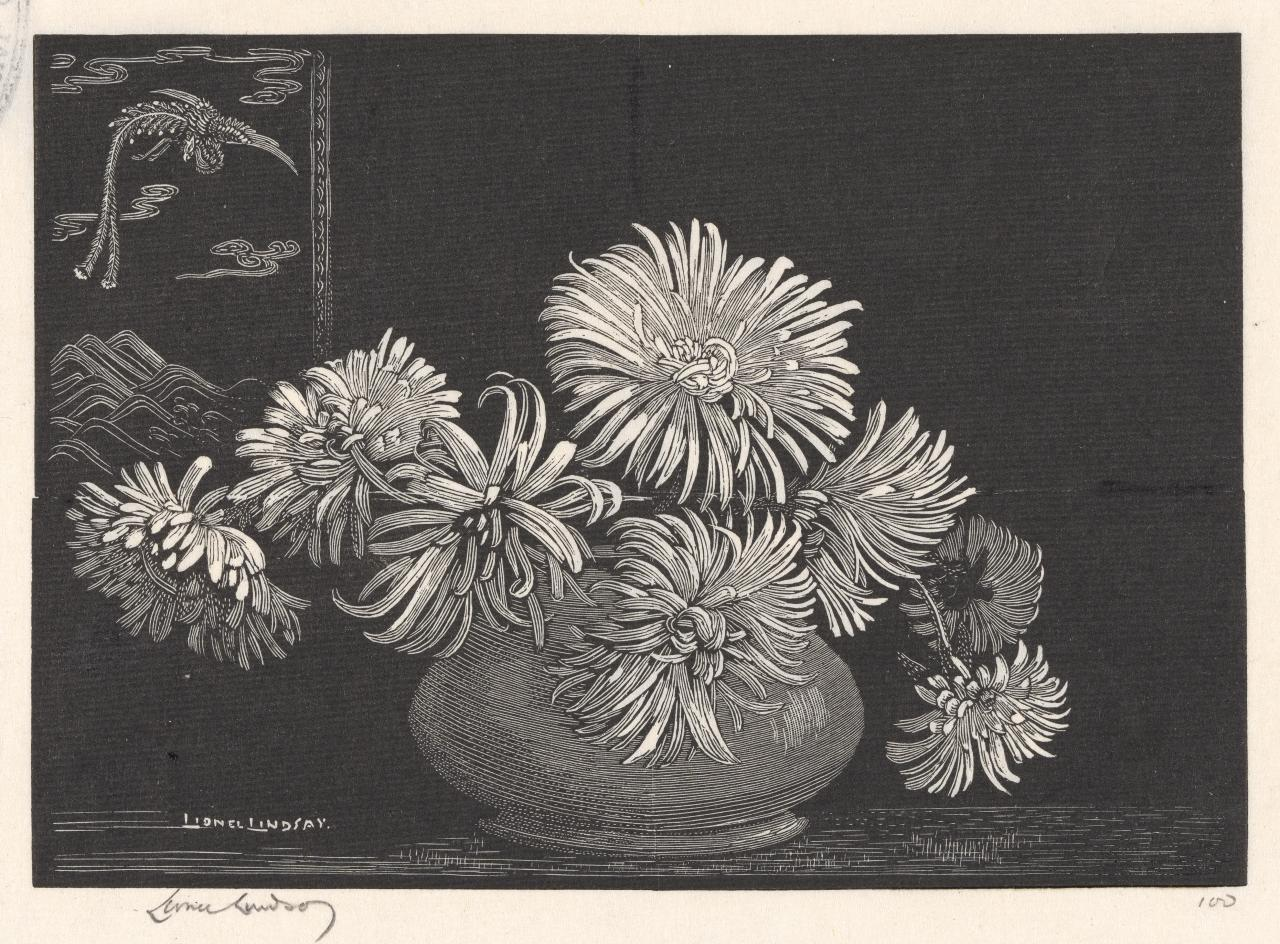
Lionel LINDSAY (1937) Asters, wood engraving, 10.2 × 14.5 cm (block). National Gallery of Victoria

Lionel’s close friendship with his brother Norman did not last. All the Lindsay family was devastated when news came that Reg Lindsay had been killed on the Western Front, on 31 December 1916. Lionel’s response was to intensely experiment with new ways of making art. He began to make wood engravings, initially based on the work of the 18th century British artist Thomas Bewick, an approach that was mocked by Norman. At the same time Lionel dismissed Norman’s attempts to speak with their dead brother via a ouija board.

There were quarrels and reconiliations, but when Norman quoted sections of Lionel’s adolescent diary in Redheap, a book that was banned in Australia, there was no more contact between the two. Lionel became closer to his youngest brother Daryl, a friendship recorded in letters held in the La Trobe Library.

Another friendship of Lionel Lindsay’s later years was with the then Attorney General, Robert Menzies whose mother Lionel had known when she was a Creswick shopkeeper’s daughter. This close friendship was the reason he became a foundation member of Menzies’ anti-modernist Australian Academy of Art. In 1941, during Menzies’ first term as Prime Minister, Lionel Lindsay was knighted for his services to Australian art in 1941.

As with many older Australian artists Lionel Lindsay was opposed to modern art, which he considered 'degenerate'. His friend, Basil Burdett, had hoped to persuade him that all was not bad with his selection for the 1939 Herald Exhibition of French and British Contemporary Art. But by the time the exhibition reached Australia the world was at war, Burdett was enlisted in the Air Force, and by 1942 was dead. The aggressive anti-traditionalist approach by Peter Bellew, enraged Lionel Lindsay and was a factor in his writing the anti-modernist polemic Addled Art.

The chapter, ”The Jew in Modern Art” reflected prevailing prejudices of his generation. However its publication coincided with news of the full extent of the Holocaust. Others, including those who had written agreeing with Lindsay, could pretend they were not anti-semitic, but Lionel Lindsay was in print and so took the brunt of the art world’s revulsion at the ancient prejudice.

== Later life ==
Lionel Lindsay was a compulsive letter writer. Much of his correspondence is held in the Mitchell and the La Trobe Libraries. They show his distress at the modernist tendencies of Hal Missingham, the new Director of the Art Gallery of NSW, his admiration for the German poet Heine and his love of both good food and gardening.

He became the nurse for his wife Jean, as she struggled with acute asthma. In one letter to Menzies he asked why wasn’t it possible to make heroin legal, as it was effective pain relief. Lionel was not alone in caring for Jean. His son Peter, who had served as ground crew in the RAF during the Battle of Britain, had returned to Australia at the end of the war and became the nurse for both his parents.

There were some honours in his last years. After Menzies was elected Prime Minister in 1949 he hosted Lionel at Kirribilli House and in 1959 flew him in an official RAAF Jet for the official opening of the Lionel Lindsay Art Gallery and Library at Toowoomba.

On March 7 1961 he received the news that his friend Harold Wright had died and wrote that “of course I accept death as a natural thing, as natural as birth – but we are part of our friends and they are a part of ourselves.” Lionel Lindsay died at Hornsby Hospital on 22 May 1961.

== Awards ==
- 1937: Society of Artists medal for 'outstanding contributions to Australian art
- 1941: Knighthood, as an 'eminent artist of the commonwealth' in the 1941 New Year Honours announced 31 December 1940

== Legacy ==
Lionel Lindsay’s son Peter spent much of the rest of his life ensuring his father was not forgotten. He edited Lionel’s autobiography, Comedy of Life, which was published in 1967, and donated prints, drawings, paintings and photographs to many public collections, especially the National Library. To ensure that he stayed in the public eye and there was no ambiguity about copyright, Peter Lindsay and Jean Charley donated their father’s copyright to the National Library of Australia.

The revival of interest in printmaking of the 1960s and ‘70s led to a renewed interest in those Australian artists who had pioneered the medium at the beginning of the century. In 1974, the centerary of his birth, the Ballarat Fine Art Gallery held a detailed chronological survey of Lionel Lindsay’s graphic art. The introduction to the catalogue was written by Sir Robert Menzies. The exhibition then travelled to the Art Gallery of NSW, garnering greater interest in his art.

There have been a number of survey exhibitions since; including in 2018/19 a national touring exhibition, Lionel’s Place, curated by the Maitland Regional Art Gallery.

Although some accounts of Modernism in Australia continue to ignore his art, preferring to discuss him as a reactionary anti-semite, recent scholarship has taken a more nuanced perspective.

== Publications ==
- Lionel Lindsay, A book of woodcuts, drawn on wood and engraved (Sydney: Art in Australia; London: Constable, 1922).
- Lionel Lindsay, Twenty-one woodcuts (Sydney: Meryon Press, 1924).
- Lionel Lindsay, Etchings & drypoints of Spain & Australia (London: Colnaghi, 1927).
- Sydney Ure Smith and Leon Gellert (eds.), The art of Lionel Lindsay (Sydney: Art in Australia, 1928).
- Lionel Lindsay, Drawing and drawings in Australia (Sydney: Fairfax, 1937).
- Lionel Lindsay, Addled art (Sydney: Angus and Robertson, 1942).
- Lionel Lindsay, Comedy of life: an autobiography, 1874–1961 (Sydney: Angus & Robertson, 1967).
- Lionel Lindsay, A Consideration of the Art of Ernest Moffitt.
- Joanna Mendelssohn, The art of Sir Lionel Lindsay. Volume 1. Woodcuts (Brookvale, N.S.W.: Copperfield Publishing Co., c1982).
- Joanna Mendelssohn, The art of Sir Lionel Lindsay. Volume II (Brookvale, N.S.W.: Copperfield, c1987).
