= George Collingridge =

Australian writer and artist

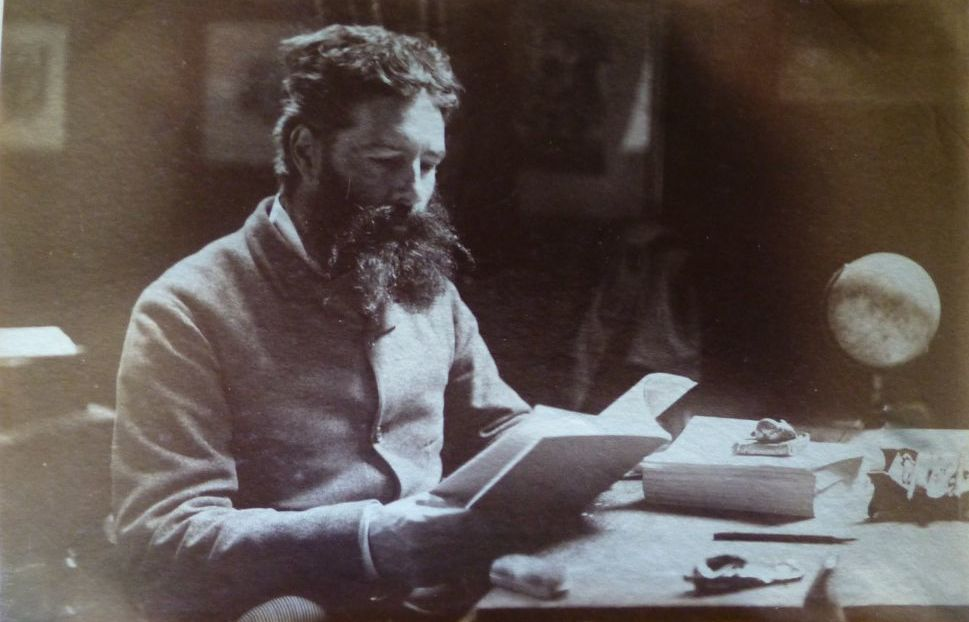
- George Collingridge, c.1886
- Born: George Alphonse Collingridge de Tourcey; 29 October 1847; Oxfordshire, England
- Died: 1 June 1931 (aged 83); Berowra, New South Wales, Australia
- Resting place: Field of Mars Cemetery
- Occupations: Writer, illustrator, art teacher
- Known for: Early theory of Portuguese discovery of Australia
- Notable work: The Discovery of Australia (1895)
- Relatives: Vanessa Collingridge (distant relative)
- Awards: Knight Commander of the Order of Santiago (Portugal, 1908); Knight Commander of the Order of Isabella the Catholic (Spain, 1917)

George Alphonse Collingridge de Tourcey (he rarely used 'de Tourcey') (29 October 1847 – 1 June 1931) was an Australian writer and illustrator best known today for his early assertions of Portuguese discovery of Australia in the 16th century.

== Early life ==
He was born in Oxfordshire, England, educated in Paris (in the 15th arrondissement), served in the Papal Zouaves (alongside his brother Alfred, who died in the Battle of Mentana), and migrated to Australia in 1879 aboard the Lusitania (not the ship of the same name that sank in 1915). He settled in the then isolated area of Berowra, before moving to nearby Hornsby, New South Wales.

== Career ==
Since his French academic qualifications as a "Professeur" were not recognised by Australian universities, he worked as an artist and art teacher, and contributed drawings and articles to local newspapers. He founded the first Australian art magazine, Australian Art: a Monthly Magazine & Journal, and with his brother, Arthur Collingridge (1853 – 1907), was one of the founders of the Royal Art Society of New South Wales.

His publication of The Discovery of Australia in 1895 earned him accolade as a "genius" and as "an authority on geographical matters" from members of the Royal Geographical Society as well as foreign honours: in 1908 he was created a Knight Commander of the Order of Santiago by the King of Portugal. In 1917 he was made a Knight Commander of the Order of Isabella la Catolica by the King of Spain. However, not everyone was as complimentary; his official biographer, O.H.K. Spate, described him as of "undisciplined intellect" and lacking a "rigorously judicial habit of mind"; the book was a financial failure; and a proposed scheme to use a simplified version of the book, The First Discovery of Australia and New Guinea (1906), in schools was withdrawn.

Collingridge published "Alice in One Dear Land" in 1922. It is a handmade book with numerous small tipped in plates. Alice is depicted in the Australian bush with a koala, this is the first depiction of "Alice in Wonderland" in an Australian setting.

Collingridge's distant relative, Vanessa Collingridge, published a book on Captain Cook, entitled Captain Cook (2002), and the publication of this book has caused a certain resurgence of interest in George Collingridge in recent years.

He died at Berowra on 1 June 1931 and was buried at Field of Mars Cemetery.

== Works ==
- Collingridge, George (1895). The Discovery of Australia. A Critical, Documentary and Historic Investigation Concerning the Priority of Discovery in Australasia by Europeans before the Arrival of Lieut. James Cook, in the "Endeavour", in the Year 1770. Sydney: Hayes brothers.
- Collingridge, George (1982), The first discovery of Australia and New Guinea, Pan Books, ISBN 978-0-330-27038-0
- Collingridge, George (1924), It : is principally a collection of wood cuts, [G. Collingridge
- Collingridge, George (1925), Round and round the world, G. Collingridge
- Collingridge, George; Collingridge, George, 1847-1931 (1924), Berowra & the unsolved mystery of its amazing ridge, G. Collingridge
