= Australian Art: a Monthly Magazine & Journal =

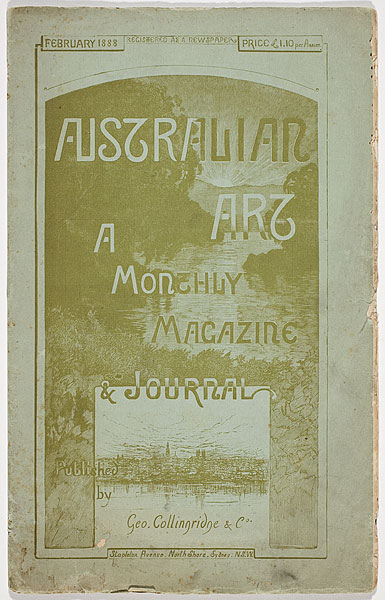
Cover of Australian Art: a monthly magazine and journal. 1888

Australian Art: a Monthly Magazine & Journal, was a monthly magazine published in Sydney, Australia. The publication's focus was to chronicle the progress of the fine arts in the Australasian colonies. Issues also included artist-proof engravings.

== History ==
The magazine was published by George Collingridge and Co., on the north shore of Sydney, New South Wales. It was the first Australian journal devoted to art. Originally the magazine planned at least twelve months of issues, however it appears that only three issues were published in January, February, and March 1888.

Some of the articles included in the three issues discussed Australian decorative art, essays on colour and the fine arts in Australia and Exhibitions of the Art Society of New South Wales. The March 1888 issue of the magazine was criticised by The Sydney Mail and New South Wales Advertiser as having very little to do with Australian art and including too many illustrations from foreign subjects.

== Digitisation ==
This magazine has been digitised on Trove by the National Library of Australia.

== See also ==
- George Collingridge
