= Nash brothers =

British artists

The Nash brothers were two British artists, Paul Nash (11 May 1889 – 11 July 1946) and John Nash (11 April 1893 – 23 September 1977). Both were noted war artists.
