= Alan D. Mickle =

Australian writer

Alan Durward Mickle (20 August 1882 – 15 May 1969) was an Australian writer of essays and verse.

== History ==
Mickle was born in East Melbourne, the elder son of David Mickle (died 3 January 1918), and educated at Queen's College, St. Kilda, and Melbourne Grammar School.

He was living with his mother at 30 Marine Parade, St Kilda, Victoria, in 1919 and married Ida Jeanette Cameron on 16 December 1922. No mention of children has been found.

== Works by A. D. Mickle ==
- The Great Longing (1910) Jonathan Cape
- The Dark Tower (1912)
- Said My Philosopher (1919)
- The Wee Dog (1922)
- The Questing Mind (1925)
- This Age of Ours (1927)
- Six Plays of Eugene O'Neill (1928) criticism
- The Poor Poet and the Beautiful Lady (1931)
- Pemmican Pete and Other Verses (1933)
- The Great City verse
- The Pilgrimage of Peer
- Appartement in Brussels (1940)
