= Sydney Ure Smith =

Artist, arts publisher and promoter

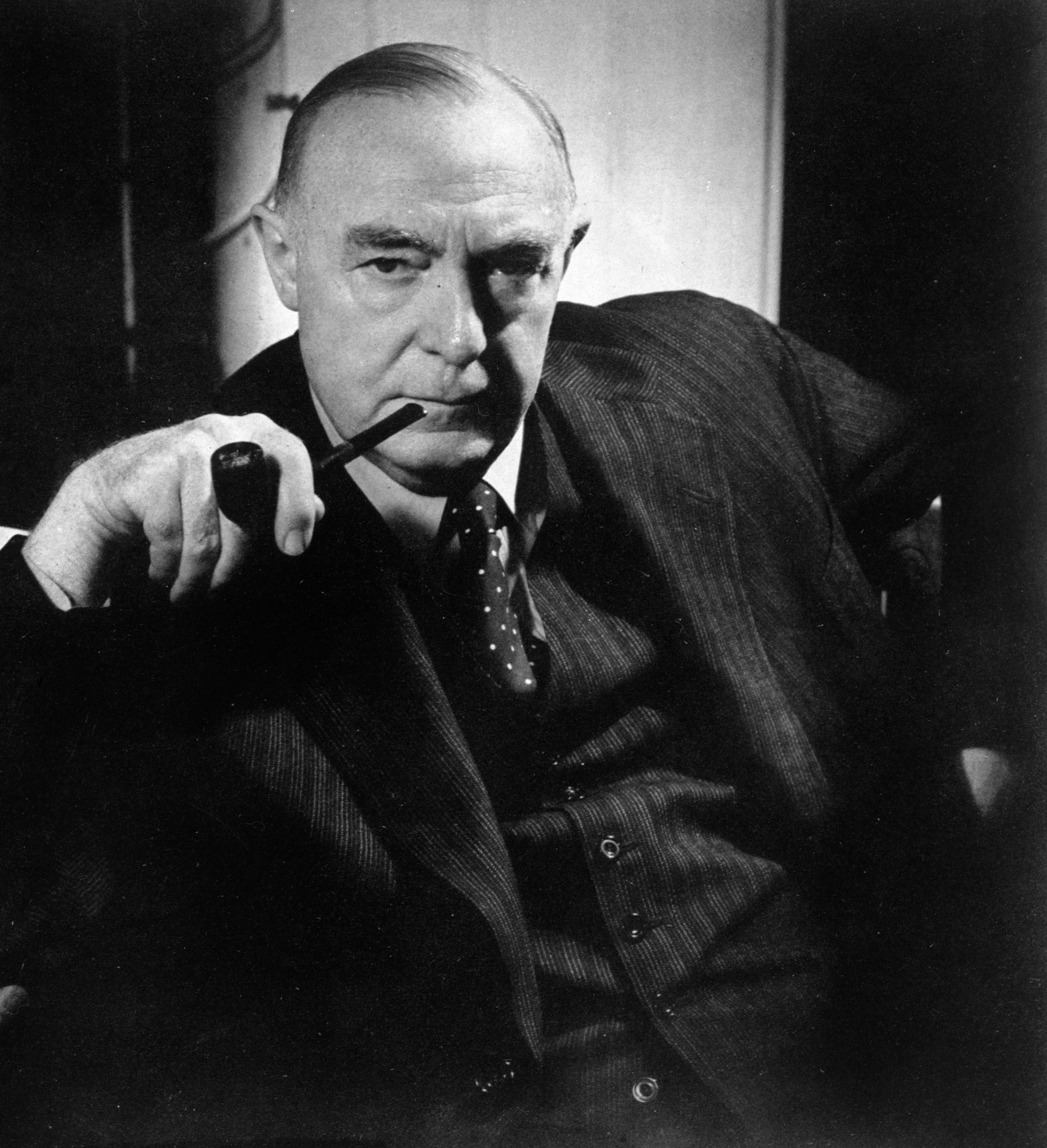
- Sydney Ure Smith, 1948
- Born: 9 January 1887; London, England
- Died: 11 October 1949 (aged 62); Potts Point, Australia
- Known for: Painting, publishing

Sydney George Ure Smith OBE (9 January 1887 – 11 October 1949) was an Australian arts publisher, artist and promoter who "did more than any other Australian to publicize Australian art at home and overseas".

Unlike most of his contemporaries, he seldom submitted his own art work for publication. He published some of his own work in limited edition books such as Old Sydney (1911) and Old Colonial By-Ways (1928), prompted by his passion for preserving historic buildings.

== Early life ==
He was born in London in 1887 and arrived in Australia with his parents later that same year. His father John (d. 1919) was manager of the Menzies Hotel, Melbourne and later of the Hotel Australia, Sydney for over 20 years. His parents adopted the form "Ure Smith": his mother (d. 1931) was born Catherine Ure, but formally their surname remained Smith.

He was educated at Queen's College, Melbourne and then at Sydney Grammar School. He studied pencil and ink drawing at the Julian Ashton Art School (1902–07) and then learnt the techniques of etching from Eirene Mort. At age 19 he helped Harry Julius and Albert Collins found the commercial art studio that later became Smith and Julius.

He died in 1949 after several years of ill health and was survived by a son from his second marriage, Sydney George 'Sam' Ure-Smith (died 19 November 2013) and a daughter, Dorothy Hemphill (died 15 March 2009).

== Business ==
Artistic expression to him was never more than a pleasant pastime; his real passion lay in harnessing technology to reproduce the works of others. In 1916 he founded a syndicate with Bertram Stevens and Charles Lloyd Jones to publish Art in Australia, and in the same year he founded the commercial art studio and advertising firm Smith and Julius with Harry Julius, specialising in high quality artwork for prestigious clients such as Dunlop and Berlei. They employed such prominent Sydney artists as James Muir Auld, Fred Britton, Frank Burdett, Harold Cazneaux, Albert Collins (who was a director 1916–51), Roy de Maistre, Adrian Feint, George Frederick Lawrence, Percy Leason, John Passmore, Lloyd Rees, Bill Sparrow and Roland Wakelin. After 1923 he ceased active involvement with the company.

He founded magazine The Home, published monthly from February 1920–42, in the mould of Harper's Bazaar, Vogue and Vanity Fair.

He founded Ure Smith Pty. Ltd. in 1939, initially to publish Australia: National Journal (quarterly, then monthly, 1939–47). He edited books on J. J. Hilder, Arthur Streeton, Blamire Young, Hans Heysen, Norman Lindsay, Elioth Gruner, Margaret Preston, George Lambert, Douglas Annand, Francis Lymburner and William Dobell.

He also published the Australian Art Annual (of which only one issue appeared, in 1939) and several books in the Present Day Art in Australia Series (1946).

When Sydney Ure Smith died in 1949, his son Sam Ure-Smith took over the management of the firm.

The latter published a number of book series including the Ure Smith Miniature Series and the Walkabout Pocketbooks. In 1957 he published John O'Grady's book They're a Weird Mob (published under the pseudonym of Nino Culotta), which became a bestseller. Beginning in May 1963 he published the periodical Art & Australia which was the successor to his father's magazine Art in Australia, and is still in print. In 1964 he established the paperback reprint imprint Humorbooks, with titles by Australian and foreign authors.

In 1965 the Ure Smith firm was acquired by Horwitz and in 1972 Paul Hamlyn bought Ure Smith from Horwitz.

== Public life ==
Sydney Ure Smith led a furiously active public life: he was a foundation member (with Gayfield Shaw, Lionel Lindsay, John Shirlow, Eirene Mort, David Barker, Albert Henry Fullwood, John Barclay Godson, and Bruce Robertson) of the Australian Painter-Etchers Society in 1920 and almost certainly was instrumental in founding its daughter organisation, the Australian Print Collectors' Club in 1925.

He was president of the New South Wales Society of Artists in the period 1921–47. He was a trustee of the Art Gallery of New South Wales 1927–47 (and vice-president 1943–47, supporting the controversial 1943 Archibald Prize going to William Dobell for his portrait of Joshua Smith).

He was on the Advisory Committee for Applied Art (1925–31), a member of the Australian War Memorial art committee and a trustee of the New South Wales government travelling scholarship committee.

From 1937 Smith was a foundation member and vice-president of Menzies' conservative Australian Academy of Art. He was chairman of the committees for the cultural section of the Australian pavilions at New York World's Fair (1939) and the New Zealand Centennial Exhibition (1939–40). He was on the organising committee for the Art of Australia exhibition that toured North America (1941–45). He was one of the founders of the Empire-United States of America Art Trust, and a council member of the Australian Limited Editions Society. He was a frequent guest on radio programs.

== Exhibitions ==
- 1934, to 29 September: Newman Gallery; group show with sixteen other exhibitors, including John Shirlow, Victor Cobb, Oscar Binder, J. C. Goodhart, Allan Jordan, Jessie C. Traill, Harold Herbert, John C. Goodchild, Cyril Dillon and Charles Nuttall.

== Recognition ==
He was awarded the New South Wales Society of Artists medal in 1931. He was appointed an Officer of the Order of the British Empire (OBE) in 1937.

== Personal life ==
He married a fellow art student Viola Austral Quaife, a granddaughter of Rev. Barzillai Quaife in 1909. His second wife was Ethel Bickley.

An accomplished mimic and raconteur, "on Sunday mornings he entertained a stream of visitors from Europe as well as such friends as Lionel Lindsay, Hardy Wilson and (Sir) Robert Menzies".

== Gallery ==
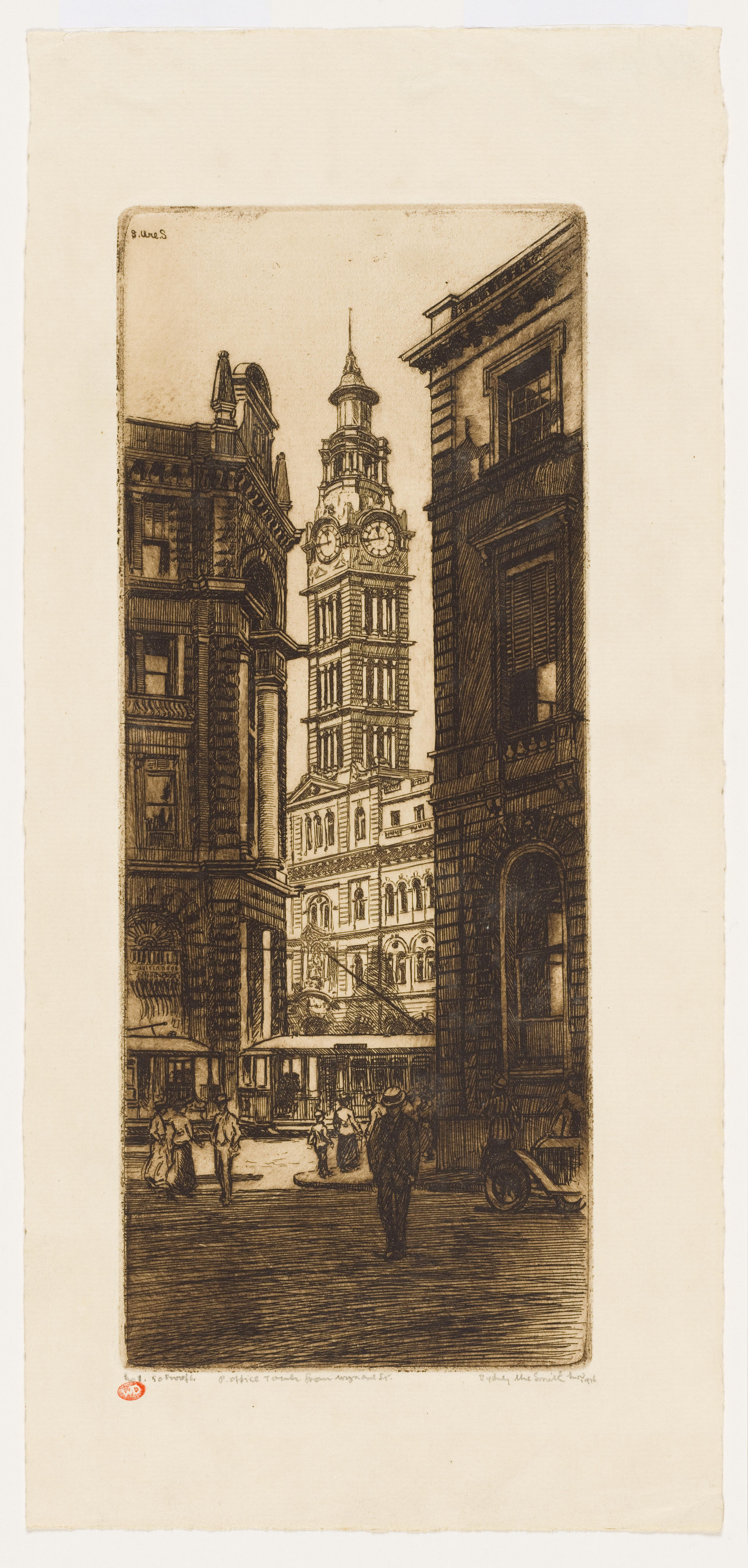
Post Office Tower from Wynyard Street, 1916: etching by Sydney Ure Smith
