= Vanessa Collingridge =

British author and broadcaster

- Born: Vanessa Jane Collingridge; 12 January 1968 (age 58); Woking, Surrey, England
- Education: Hertford College, Oxford (MA in Geography, First Class)
- Occupations: Author, broadcaster
- Known for: Biographies of James Cook and Boudica, historical cartography
- Notable work: Cook: Obsession and Betrayal in the New World (2002); Boudica (2005)
- Spouse: Alan Watt
- Children: 4

Vanessa Jane Collingridge (born 12 January 1968) is a British author and broadcaster.

== Early life and education ==
Youngest of the five children of Gordon Ernest Collingridge (1927–2007) and his wife Irene (born Irene Keeping), Collingridge was born and brought up in Woking, Surrey in England. She read Geography at Hertford College, Oxford, where she earned a first class MA in 1990, despite contracting viral encephalitis in her second year which caused an almost fatal swelling of her brain. It was also at Oxford that she met her husband Allan Watt.

== Career ==
After graduating, Collingridge moved immediately to a career in television, first as a question checker on game shows Wheel of Fortune and Win, Lose or Draw, and then for 14 months as a weather presenter on BBC Scotland. In the early to mid-1990s she appeared from time to time on BBC television's Gardeners' World. She worked on Spanish public television in 1993 as a co-presenter of "That's English!", an English learning program for Spanish people. She has since worked as a producer and presenter on all five British national terrestrial television channels, as well as BBC national radio.

In 2000 she quit her job as a television presenter on Tonight with Trevor McDonald to author two biographies, one of 18th-century explorer James Cook and one of Celtic warrior queen Boudica. During her research for the former, she discovered she shared ancestry with controversial Australian writer and illustrator George Collingridge, who asserted in 1895 that Australia was discovered by the Portuguese.

She has described her very early interest in feminism in the introduction to her book on Boudica in 2005: "What started as a strong-willed desire for independence became a fully-fledged, bra-burning (if only I had been old enough to wear one) mentality... Certainly, I cannot remember a time when I wasn't acutely aware of the inherently political nature of woman's position in society and – much to my father's disgust and my now extreme embarrassment – by the grand old age of twelve, I would proudly read Cosmopolitan magazine and proclaim myself a feminist!"

She returned to television in 2007 as writer and narrator of the four-part miniseries Captain Cook: Obsession and Discovery.

== Family life ==
Collingridge has lived in Scotland since 1989, and resides in a converted farmhouse on the shore of Castle Semple Loch near Lochwinnoch with her husband and sons Archie, Angus, Finn and Dougal. In 2017 she completed her PhD in historical cartography at the University of Glasgow, having worked as a broadcaster for BBC Radio Scotland's Buried Treasure and BBC Radio 4's Making History whilst studying.

== Bibliography ==
- Cook: Obsession and Betrayal in the New World (2002), Ebury Press, ISBN 0-09-187913-2
- Boudica (2005), Ebury Press, ISBN 0-09-189819-6
