= Art in Australia =

Australian art magazine

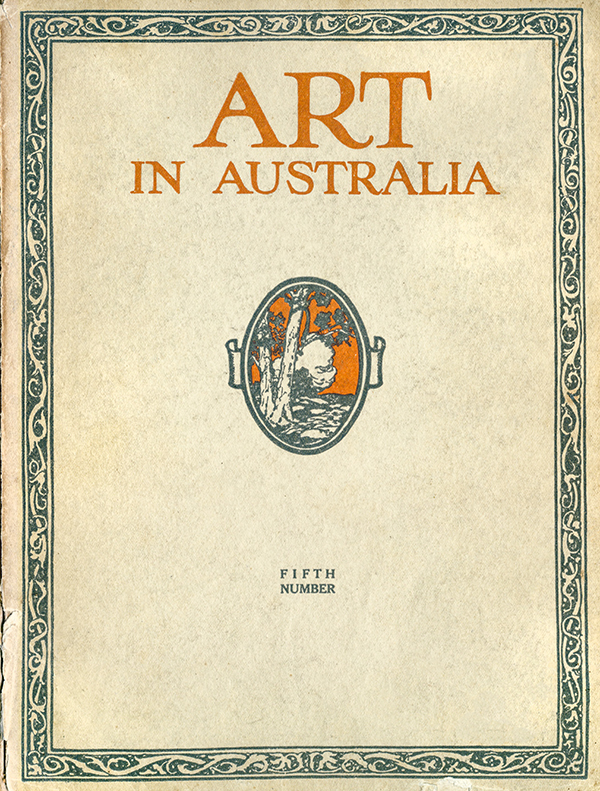
- Cover of Art in Australia No. 5, December 1918
- Categories: Art magazine
- Frequency: Semi-annual 1916–1920; quarterly 1921–1930; bimonthly 1930–1933; quarterly 1934–1942
- Format: Magazine
- Publisher: Angus & Robertson
- First issue: 1916
- Final issue: 31 August 1942; 83 years ago
- Company: Art in Australia
- Country: Australia
- Based in: Sydney
- Language: English

Art in Australia was an Australian art magazine published between 1916 and 1942.

== Founding ==
Art in Australia, was first issued in 1916. It was edited by Sydney Ure Smith, graphic artist and director of the advertising agency, Smith and Julius; Bert Stevens, who remained editor of The Lone Hand; and Charles Lloyd Jones, of the David Jones emporium family; and was published by Angus & Robertson in 1917–1918; Art in Australia Ltd in the years 1918–1934; and in its final decade (1934–1942) was published by the Sydney Morning Herald. From 1922 Leon Gellert took over editorship from Stevens and Jones, continuing in the position with Ure Smith until both retired in 1938.

Production standards were exacting and the editors oversaw photography of art and its printed reproduction to the highest quality available. In the first series – a deluxe edition, limited to 40 copies, with 30 for sale – each contained an engraver's proof print (a reproduction) signed by the artist.

Publication was semi-annual 1916–1920, quarterly 1921–1930, bimonthly 1930–1933, and back to quarterly 1934–1942.

It came out in four series:

- No. 1. 1916 – No. 11. 1921
- New Series Vol. 1. No. 1. (February 1922) – Vol. 1. No. 2 (May 1922)
- Third Series No. 1. (August 1922) – No. 81 (November 1940)
- Series 4, No. 1. (March 1941) – No. 6 (June 1942)

== Editors ==
- 1916–1938: Sydney Ure Smith
- 1916–1922: Bertram Stevens
- 1916–1921: Charles Lloyd Jones
- 1922–1938: Leon Gellert
- 1938–1940: Kenneth Wilkinson
- 1941–1942: Peter Bellew

== Publishing company ==
Incorporated in 1921, the Art in Australia company published several other magazines, including Australia: National Journal and The Home, which often balanced any shortfall by Art in Australia, which was expensive to produce, often depending on funds from Jones; and also costly to purchase, with a newsstand price of seven shillings and sixpence in 1919 (about A$34 in 2022); 12 shillings and sixpence in 1920 (about A$50 in 2022) and 1927–1929; six shillings in 1921–1922 (about A$27 in 2022); three shillings and sixpence in 1930–1934 (about A$17 in 2022); and five shillings in 1934–1942 (about A$28 in 2022). Few artists were able to afford it. Fairfax Press purchased The Home in 1934.

== Content ==
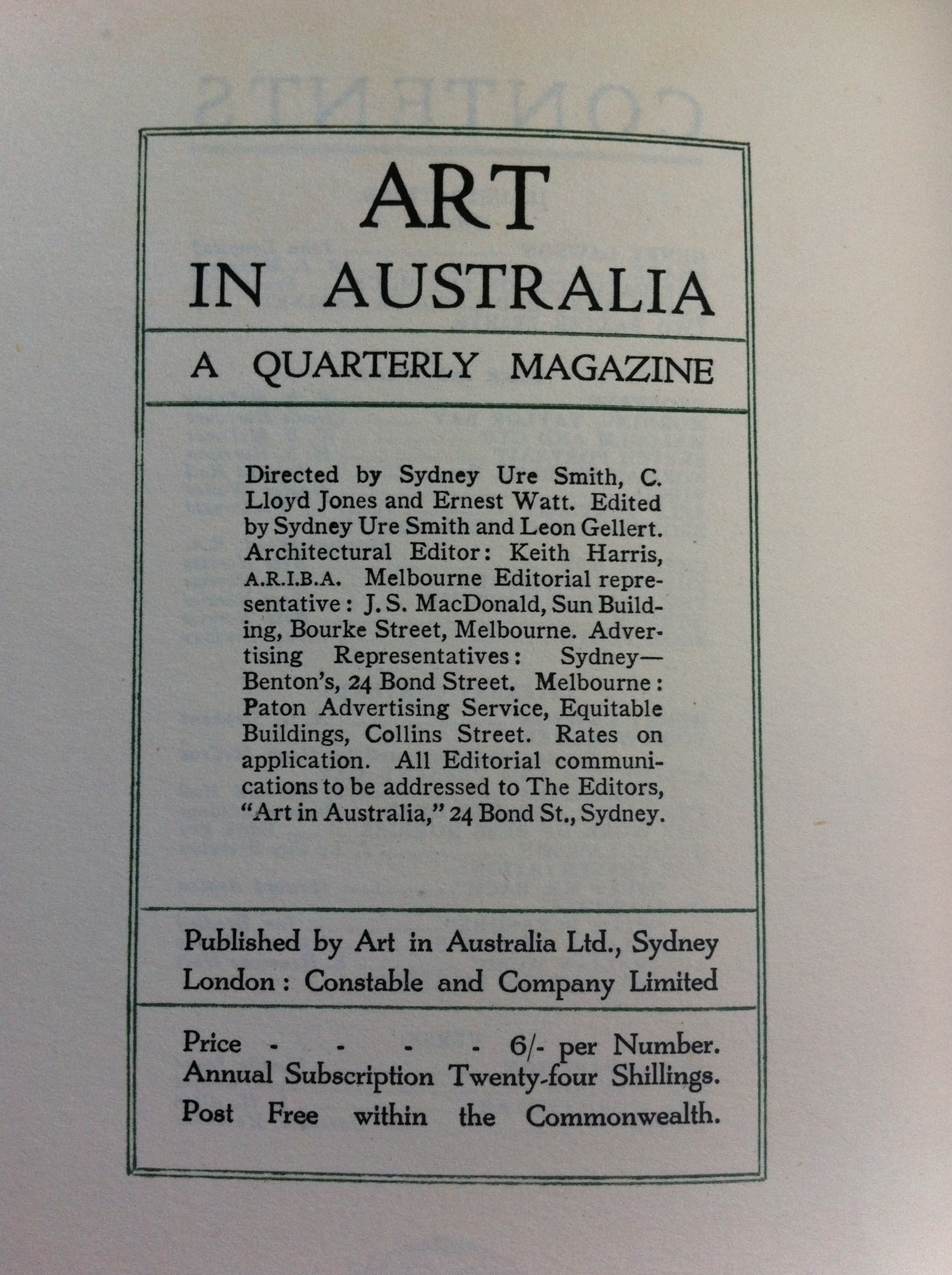
Art in Australia November 1922 contents page

Trained in art by Julian Ashton, and favouring members of the Society of Artists, Sydney, Ure Smith was a keen proponent of Australian art and to some extent its early modernists, though he was not sympathetic to abstraction, and his attitudes were influential on the content of Art in Australia, which sprang from his success in publishing the popular, high-quality photo-engravings by Hartland & Hyde in the J. J. Hilder Watercolourist exhibition catalogue in 1916. Fine illustrations continued to be a profuse and celebrated feature of the magazine. While his friends the Lindsays and Hans Heysen were conservative, Ure Smith encouraged progress in Australian art, supported the Contemporary Group in Sydney, the Melbourne Herald Exhibition of French and British Contemporary Art (1939) and imported works by Henri Matisse and André Derain for Society of Artists exhibitions. Basil Burdett, who in 1925 established Macquarie Galleries at 19 Bligh Street Sydney, was a frequent contributor and associate editor of the magazine in the mid-to-late 1920s.

Some editions of Art in Australia were specifically devoted to individual artists, or had lengthy articles on featured artists. In addition, content was enhanced with the work of designers and illustrators, including Douglas Annand who drew for Sydney Ure Smith's publications, the Home, Art in Australia and the Australian National Journal between 1935 and 1939.

Though devoted solely to the visual arts, a literary supplement to Art in Australia was proposed in 1917 and prepared during 1918, but was abandoned despite pressure from Norman Lindsay. The magazine did published some poetry and fiction during the 1920s including that of Lindsay, who promoted his conservative views, and of his son, Jack, Kenneth Slessor and Hugh McCrae, and each had individual numbers devoted to their works, while other contributors included Zora Cross, Dorothea Mackellar, Furnley Maurice, and Dowell O'Reilly. In 1924 Art in Australia held a short story competition, won by Katharine Susannah Prichard's The Grey Horse and though she contributed more, from the 1930s literary works were reserved for the companion magazine, The Home, a more regular publisher of prose and poetry in the Art in Australia group.

== Cessation ==
Retired in 1938, Ure Smith and Gellert were replaced by Kenneth Wilkinson and Peter Bellew was appointed in 1941 for the magazine's last eighteen months. These later editors were more sympathetic toward modernist art and they published poetry, including that of Max Harris and Alister Kershaw.

Art in Australia folded in August 1942.

== Legacy ==
Art in Australia was succeeded eleven years later by Art & Australia published quarterly by Sydney Ure Smith's son Sam from May 1963. It follows the high standard of reproduction of its forerunner and is now published as bi-annual digital publication Art + Australia.

== See also ==
- Australian Art: a Monthly Magazine & Journal
