= Anzac, the Landing 1915 =

Painting by George Washington Lambert

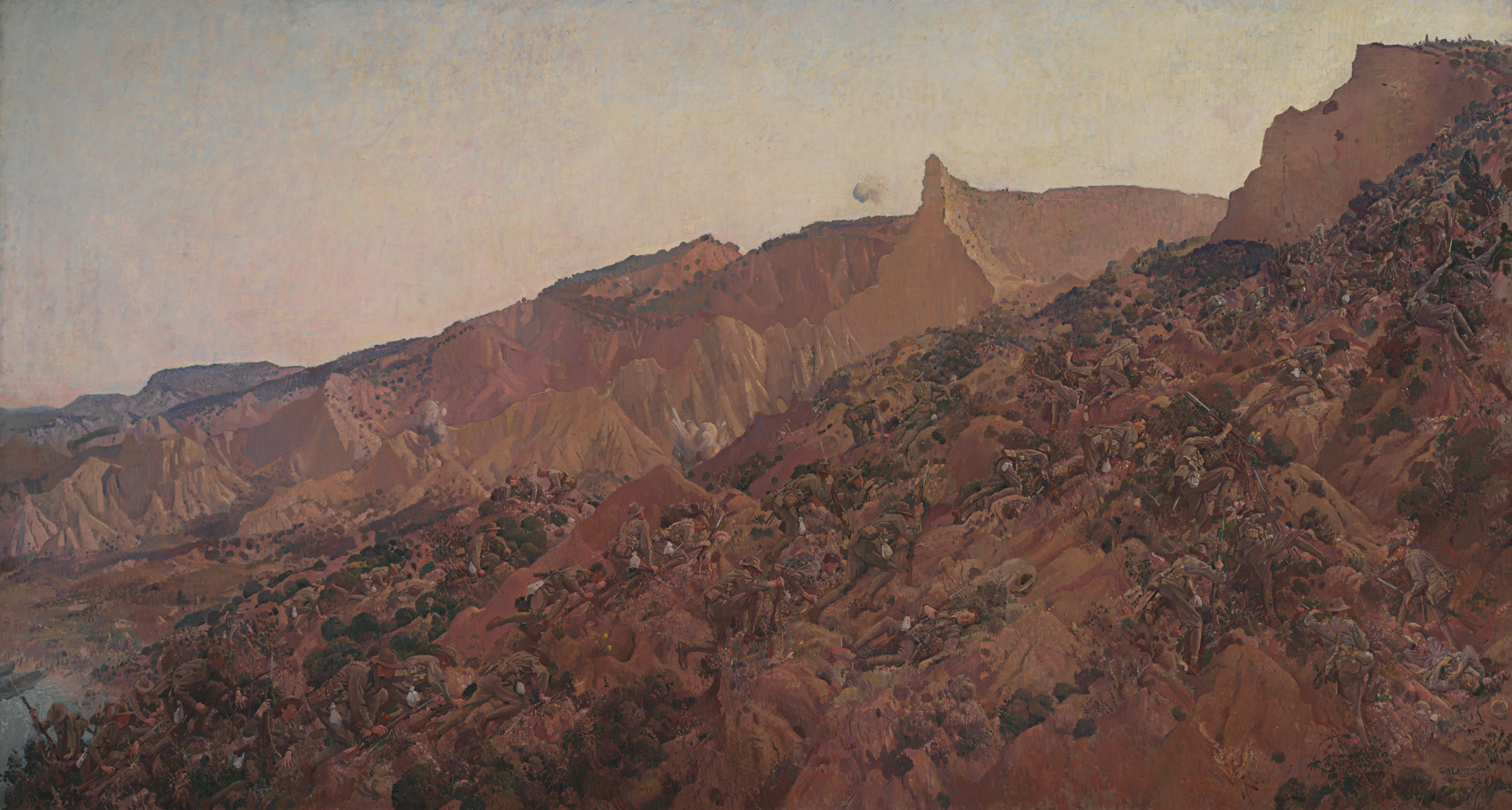
- Artist: George Washington Lambert
- Year: 1922
- Medium: oil on canvas
- Dimensions: 190.5 cm × 350.5 cm (75.0 in × 138.0 in)
- Location: Australian War Memorial; Canberra
- Website: Official website

Anzac, the Landing 1915 is a painting by Australian artist George Washington Lambert, composed between 1920 and 1922. The painting depicts the landing at Anzac Cove by the Australian and New Zealand Army Corps on 25 April 1915 during the Gallipoli Campaign during World War I. The painting is part of the collections of the Australian War Memorial and "an active agent in promulgating one of Australia’s most dominant and enduring memories – that of the Gallipoli campaign."

== Composition ==
The painting shows "Australian troops ascending ridge to Plugge's Plateau, The Sphinx, Walker's Ridge and Baby 700 on skyline, steep, rocky hillside at Gallipoli".

Onwards and upwards you scan the picture as you follow the path of the men: on the skyline there is a scurry of small figures running across open ground. Your eye follows the jagged outline of the cliff face across to the other side of the gorge and that small cloud now appears likely to be an artillery explosion. The upper half of the painting is almost devoid of human figures, dominated only by the ragged and precipitous edges of cliffs. As you follow the line of these downwards, you are taken back to the beach where men are landing on the narrow shore. [...] the artist has also managed to create the impression of an endlessly repeating film loop, as more men land, climb the slopes and run into the distance at the top right.

— Janda Gooding,

The painting has a viewing arc of around 240°, greater than the human eye can see in a single glance. It also shows various groups of soldiers landing, climbing and cresting the ridges simultaneously. Lambert felt this distortion of space and time necessary to show the entire story of the landing, balancing the need to interpret the landing in a moment with the requirement to be accurate and maintain the public trust that his painting was a reliable record of events. Lambert also took artistic licence in other matters, notably showing all Australian troops in slouch hats rather than portraying some in caps, which were worn on the day.

== Reception ==
The painting was commissioned in 1919 for £500 by the Australian High Commission in London, as part of an official war art scheme. Lambert started work on London and completed the work in 1922. It was unveiled on ANZAC Day (25 April) 1922 in Melbourne. The work was immediately popular with over 14,000 viewers in the first week of exhibition and over 770,000 by the time the exhibition closed in 1924.

[V]isitors to the Museum ... complain there is a lack of fire, a lack of action and of the terror of war, but on the facts ... we must accept that men equipped as these men were, moving upwards on this particular place, without any idea of where the enemy was, what they had to do, would look just like this small swarm of ants climbing, no matter how rapidly, climbing painfully and laboriously upward through the uneven ground and spiky uncomfortable shrubs

— George W Lambert,

Painter and critic Alexander Colquhoun in a contemporary review stated Lambert's work showed "rare dramatic and artistic skill" and "speaks ... of a declaration of sacrifice and achievement in a way that no other war picture has done".
