= Annie Murdoch =

Annie Murdoch may refer to:

- Annie Murdoch née Brown (1856–1945), wife of Patrick John Murdoch and grandmother of Rupert Murdoch
- Mrs Annie Murdoch, 1927 painting of the above, by George Washington Lambert
- Annie Murdoch (River City), a character in 2000s Scottish soap opera River City

== See also ==
- Anna Murdoch, Scottish journalist and novelist, former wife of businessman Rupert Murdoch (now Anna dePeyster)
