= Self-Portrait with Gladioli =

Painting by George Lambert

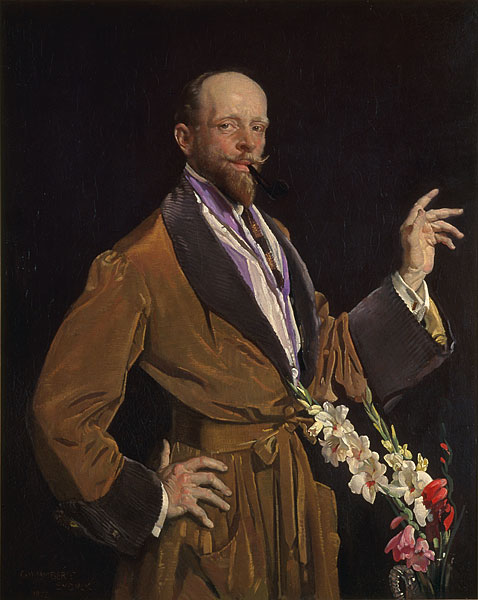
- Artist: George Washington Lambert
- Year: 1922
- Medium: oil on canvas
- Dimensions: 128.2 cm × 102.8 cm (50.5 in × 40.5 in)
- Location: National Portrait Gallery, Canberra
- Website: https://www.portrait.gov.au/portraits/2003.93/self-portrait-with-gladioli/28166/

Self-Portrait with Gladioli is a 1922 oil-on-canvas painting by Australian artist George Washington Lambert. The painting, a self-portrait, depicts Lambert in a brown velvet gown, wearing a purple scarf with a vase holding a gladiolus in front of him.

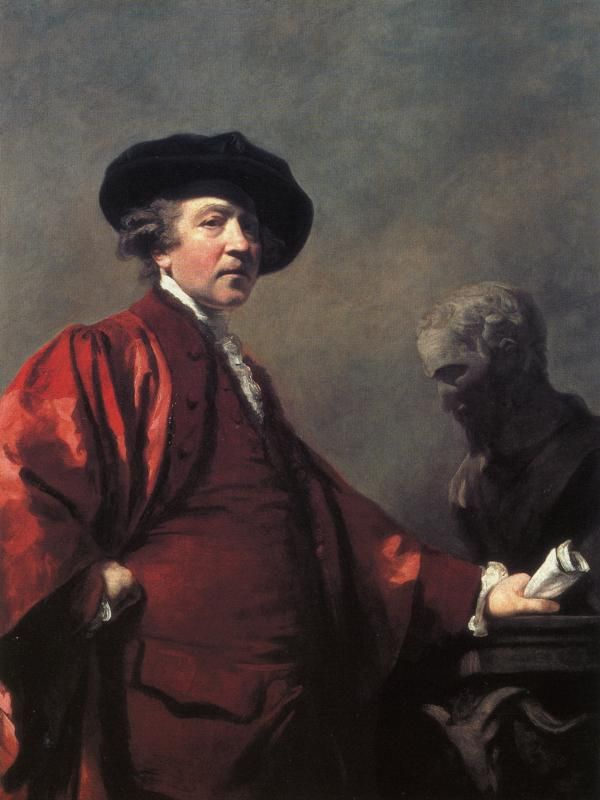
Joshua Reynolds Self-Portrait c. 1780

Lambert's stance in the painting is said to resemble that of Joshua Reynolds in a 1780 self-portrait, where Reynolds, "dressed in his academic robes, stands aristocratically with his right hand on his hip" as well as the classical Hermes Ludovisi sculpture with its one arm raised.

In painting the work, Lambert set out to portray himself as the "affected, self-admiring dandy he thought others considered him to be."

I am a luxury, a hot house rarity ... Scoffed at for preciousness. Despised for resembling a chippendale chair in a country where timber is cheap

— George W Lambert,

In reality, Lambert saw himself as a craftsman with the Sydney Mail reporting that he preferred "to be told by a critic that he had 'done his job well,' as one might address a bricklayer". At the time of painting Lambert has recently moved to Sydney and was suffering with exhaustion trying to meet a gruelling schedule of artistic commissions and lectures. Lambert said of the work " ... it was my big effort and it cost me dearly in money and swat."

Lambert's son, Maurice, described the painting as a "brilliant piece of technique" that "disguised from the mediocre but revealed to the sensitive just what a few years in Australia had done to him".

Lambert submitted the painting for consideration for the 1922 Archibald Prize where it was accepted as a finalist. Along with fellow artist John Longstaff, Lambert withdrew his works from the Archibald Prize exhibition when both artists were deemed ineligible. Despite both artists having been resident in Australia for 12 months, both maintained a London postal address.

A contemporary critic said the work required of the artist "courage, self-analysis and amazing technical skill".

The painting was sold to pastoralist and art collector Tom Elder Barr Smith in 1923 for £1,000, the highest paid for a work by Lambert during his life. In 2003, it was donated to the collection of the National Gallery of Australia by John Schaeffer and is now part of the National Portrait Gallery collection.

Yvette Coppersmith's 2018 Archibald Prize-winning painting Self portrait, after George Lambert draws on Lambert's painting for inspiration.

His style was academic, yet he supported the avant-garde in Australia and painted portraits of his artistic contemporaries Thea Proctor and Hera Roberts — both independent, self-possessed style-makers at a time of burgeoning female empowerment. In referencing George Lambert's style, it's like an outfit slipped on, creating a fixed image of an ever-changing self.

— Yvette Coppersmith,
