= Important People =

Important People may refer to:

- Important People (Lambert), a 1914 painting by George Washington Lambert
- Important People (film), a 1934 British film directed by Adrian Brunel.
