= Cadogan Lane =

Street in Belgravia, London

Coordinates: 51.4963°N 0.1566°W

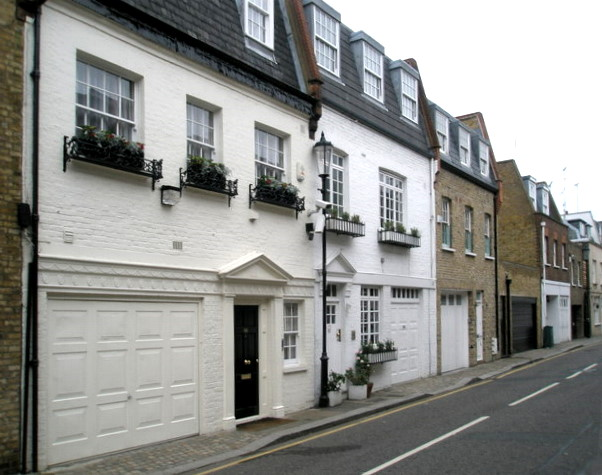
Mews houses in Cadogan Lane

Cadogan Lane, originally Little Cadogan Place, is a street in London's Belgravia which runs between Pont Street in the north, and a junction with Cadogan Place and D'Oyley Street in the south. It is one of the streets in the area named after the Earls of Cadogan that began to be developed in 1777. The lane was laid-out by 1799 but had few buildings until the twentieth century. Today it is mostly made up of small mews houses which back onto the larger houses in Cadogan Place, and Chesham Place and Chesham Street, between which Cadogan Lane runs.

== Origins ==
Cadogan Lane is one of the streets in the area named after the Earls of Cadogan whose ancestor Hans Sloane purchased the Manor of Chelsea in 1712. Development of the area began in 1777 with the street laid-out by 1799 when it was shown as Little Cadogan Place on Richard Horwood's map of that year. It was still marked by that name on George Bacon's map of 1888.

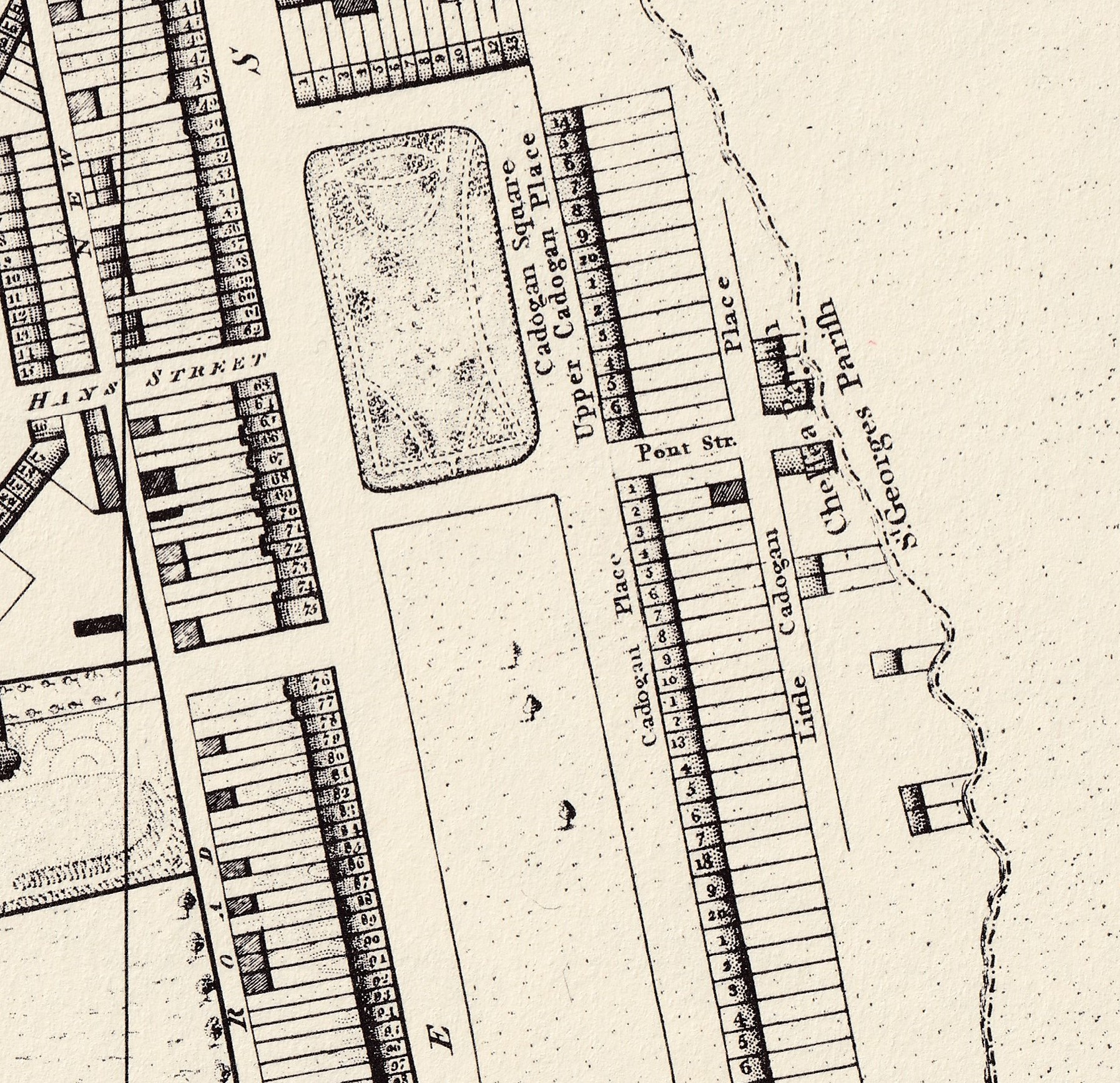
Little Cadogan Place (right) on Richard Horwood's map of 1799

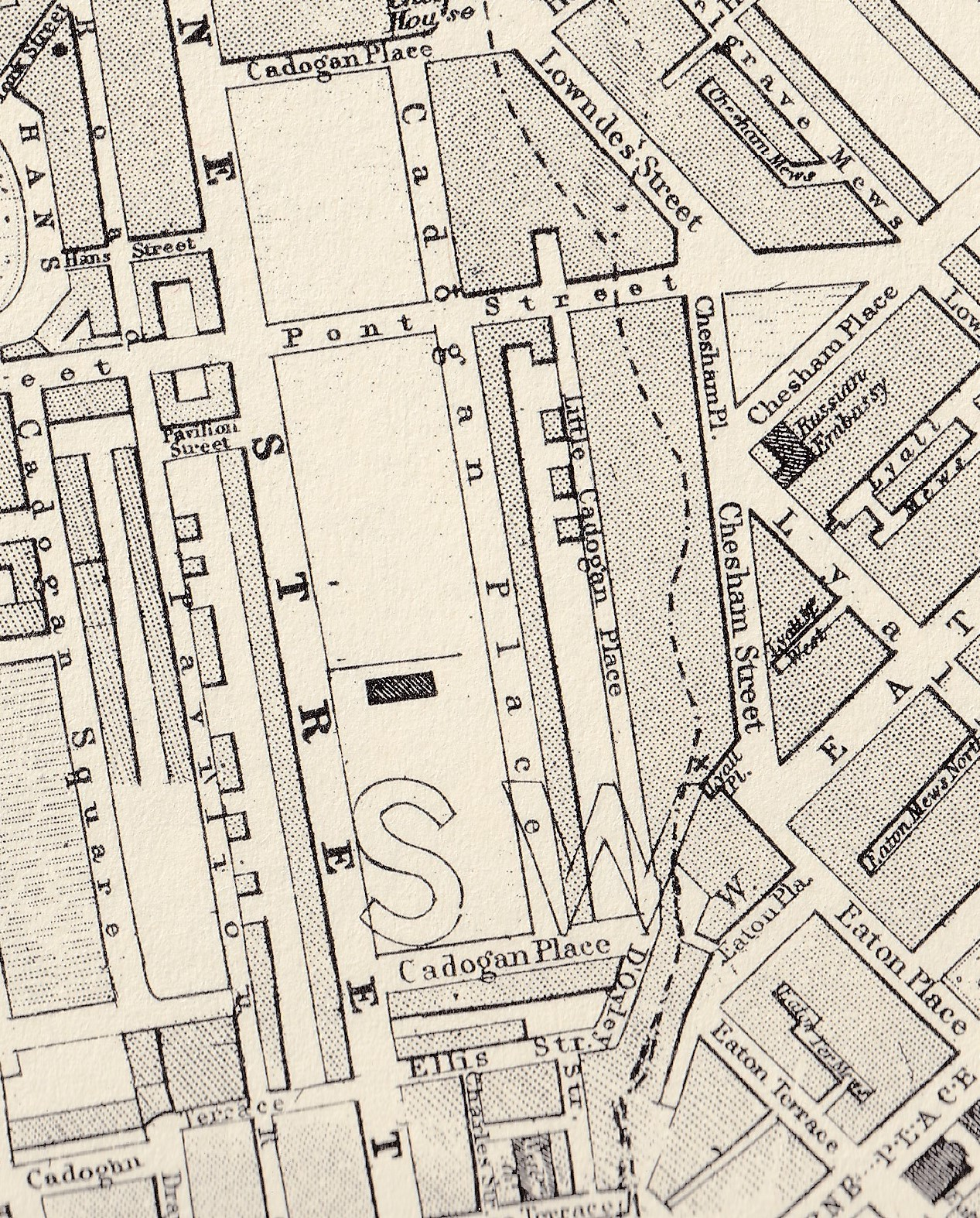
Little Cadogan Place on George Bacon's map of 1888

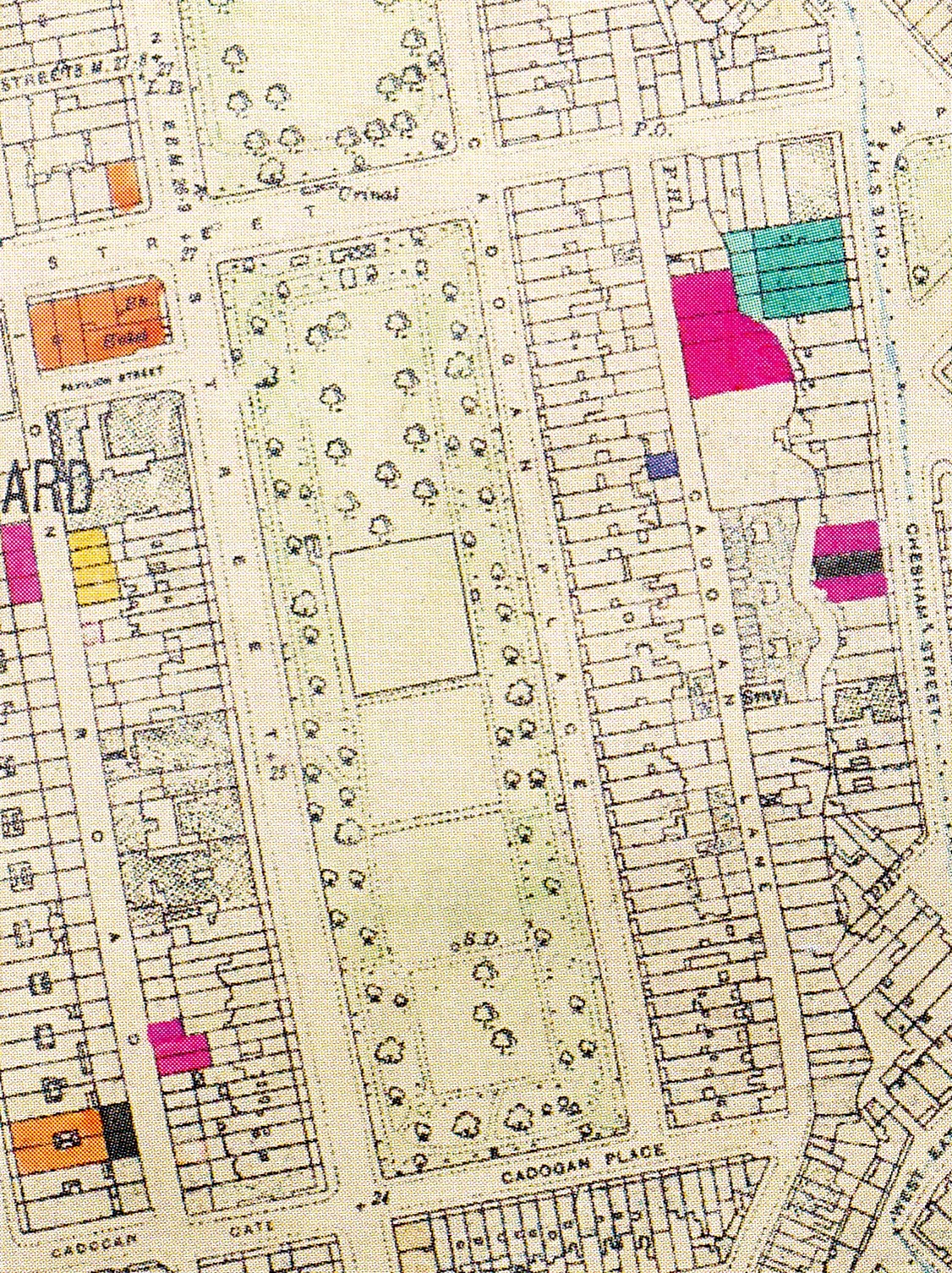
Second World War bomb damage map (Black = total destruction. Purple = damaged beyond repair. Other colours = lower levels of damage.)

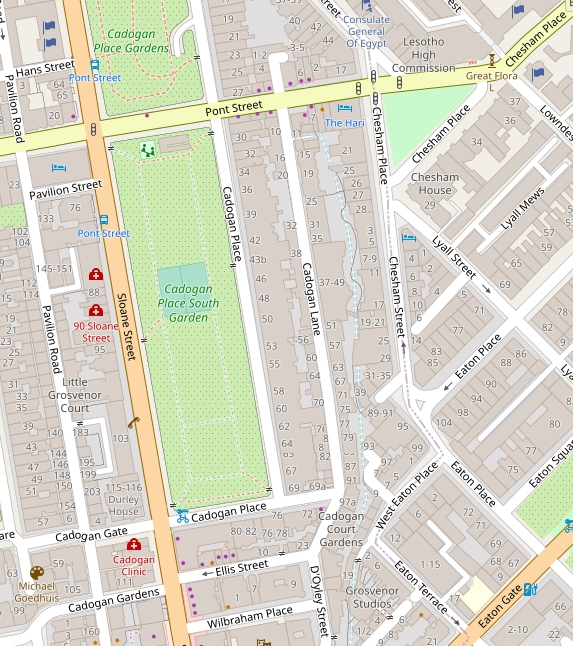
Modern area map

== Twentieth century ==
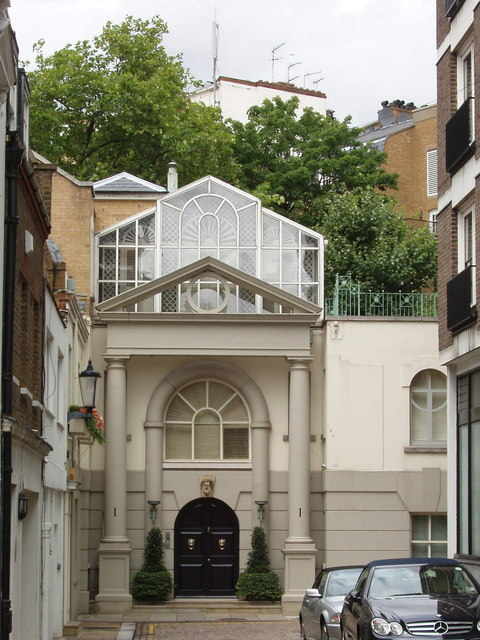
The north end of Cadogan Lane above Pont Street

Cadogan Lane had few buildings until the twentieth century, being mainly the back gardens, stables, and servants' quarters of the large houses that fronted Cadogan Place, such as the home of the Macmillan family, and the rear of the houses in Chesham Place and Chesham Street. As late as the 1950s, houses might have front entrances on the more prestigious Cadogan Place and back entrances in the more modest Cadogan Lane, such as number 39 where future High Court judge Ronald Waterhouse lived as a student.

=== Second World War period ===
Cadogan Lane was hit by several German bombs during the Second World War. Among the properties damaged was the Cadogan Riding School in Cadogan Lane, one of the largest schools in London, which had 260 horses and ponies, and the studio of art collector Tommy de Walden (8th Baron Howard de Walden) which was hit by enemy bombs twice during the war.

=== 1960s onwards ===
In the 1960s, a flat in Cadogan Lane became a centre for experiments in LSD use. Drug evangelist Michael Hollingshead visited and Joey Mellen described it as "one of the happiest turn-on centres there's ever been". Hollingshead described it as "Lots of young people on acid, eating sugar, with no one putting over a big mystery scene".

Judy Garland died in June 1969 at 4 Cadogan Lane, north of Pont Street. She was found by her husband Mickey Deans, sitting on the toilet having accidentally overdosed on barbiturates. After being empty for many years, the house was due to be demolished in 2014, and a new one built in its stead but it was not demolished until 2019. A campaign for English Heritage to erect a blue plaque failed as the house's owners did not give their consent.

In the early 1970s, Bruce Fogle worked at Woodrow & Singleton Veterinary Surgeons on the corner of Cadogan Lane and Pont Street.
