= Across the Black Soil Plains =

1899 painting by George Washington Lambert

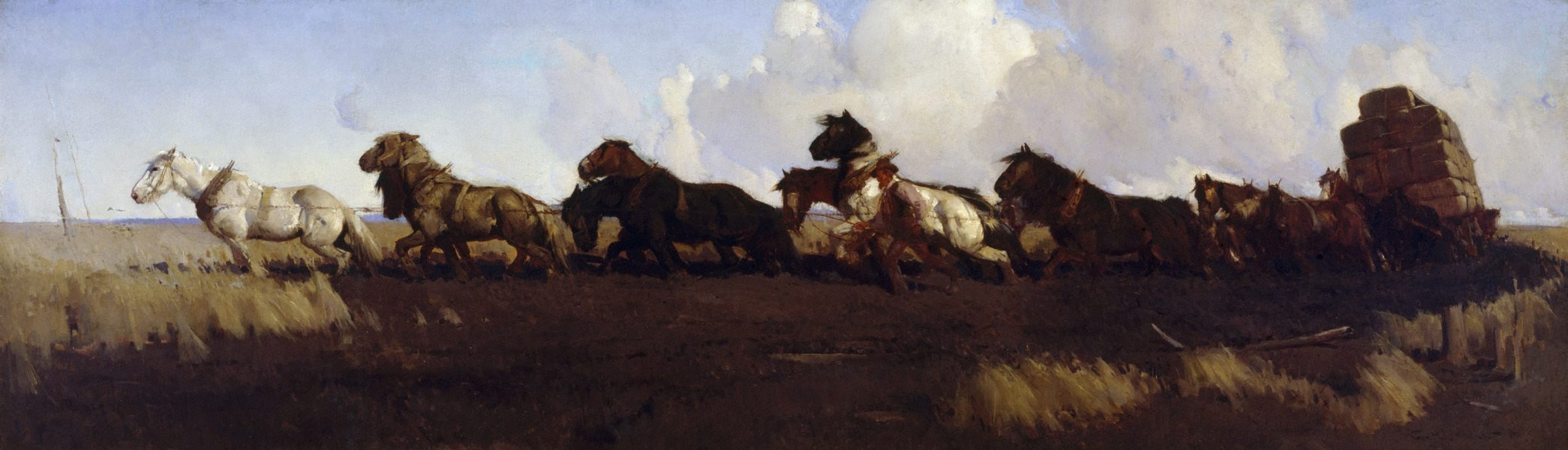
- Artist: George Washington Lambert
- Year: 1899
- Medium: oil on canvas
- Dimensions: 91.6 cm × 305.5 cm (36.1 in × 120.3 in)
- Location: Art Gallery of New South Wales, Sydney
- Website: Official website

Across the Black Soil Plains is an 1899 painting by Australian artist George Washington Lambert. The landscape depicts a team of draft horses pulling a wagon heavily laden with wool bales. Lambert's painting was awarded the Wynne Prize in 1899.

The painting had its inspiration in Lambert's experiences in droving sheep, seeing "horse teams hauling heavily laden wool wagons across the bare, miry, flat lands of Snakes Plain from Warren to the railway station at Nevertire."

As a boy in the bush I did much work with draft [sic] horses ... [One] called Barney had such fine action and such imposing carriage ... and possibly what knowledge I displayed in connection with horses in ‘Black Soil Plains’ originated with my association with this exceptionally fine animal

— George Washington Lambert,

Lambert composed the painting in a shed at its mother's house in Hornsby, a suburb of Sydney. When working on the painting, Lambert placed the long and narrow canvas diagonally in the shed. Several names have been suggested as the model for the teamster, including Jim Smith from the Warren district, Luke Rollins from Moree or Henry Sharkey, who carted a record load of wool from Louth to Bourke.

The painting was a critical success with the Sydney Morning Herald stating "‘In this long narrow canvas the young artist paints with astonishing vigour and sense of movement ... in every conceivable attitude the horses tug and strain at the heavy load."

The painting was also subject of a poem of the same name as journalist Gordon Tidy (c. 1862–1953) under his pen name 'Mousquetaire' in The Bulletin, 30 October 1902. His words have been compared to Will H. Ogilvie's 'How the Fire Queen crossed the swamp'.

The painting was acquired by the Art Gallery of New South Wales at the New South Wales Society of Artists exhibition in 1899 and remains part of its collection.
