= Michelago railway station =

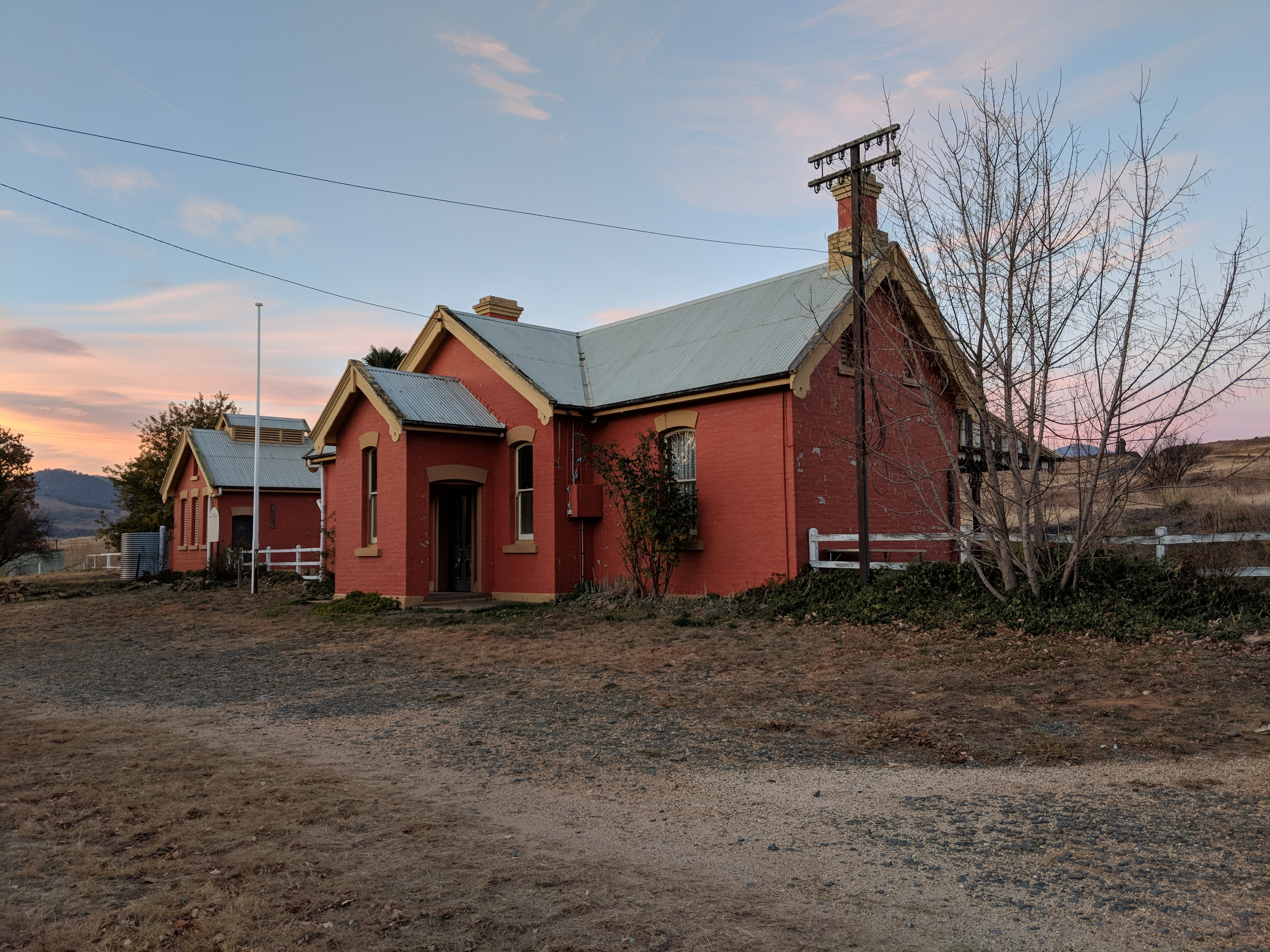
- Michelago station in 2018

General information
- Location: Michelago NSW; Australia
- Coordinates: 35.7108°S 149.1661°E
- Elevation: 699.5 metres (2,295 ft)
- Owner: Transport Asset Manager of New South Wales
- Line: Bombala railway line
- Platforms: 1 – 330 feet (100 m)
- Tracks: 2

History
- Opened: 7 December 1887

Other services
turntable
- Location within New South Wales Location within Australia
- Location: Goulburn-Bombala railway, Michelago, Snowy Monaro Regional Council, New South Wales, Australia

New South Wales Heritage Register
- Official name: Michelago Railway Station group
- Type: state heritage (complex / group)
- Designated: 2 April 1999
- Reference no.: 01192
- Type: Railway Platform/Station
- Category: Transport – Rail
- Builders: Messrs. Roley and Harris
Location

Michelago railway station is a heritage-listed former railway station on the Bombala railway line at Michelago, Snowy Monaro Regional Council, New South Wales, Australia. The property was added to the New South Wales State Heritage Register on 2 April 1999.

== History ==
The station buildings were constructed by contractors Pooley and Harris, with the railway line constructed by A. Johnston and Co.

Michelago railway station opened to traffic on Wednesday 7 December 1887, when at 9am the first Government railway engine to cross the Michelago plain arrived at the station, with four passenger carriages containing visitors from Queanbeyan and surrounds. An hour later, the company's engine arrived from Queanbeyan with one passenger carriage. Around 200 people were present for a lunch provided by member for Braidwood Alexander Ryrie and Mr Johnston, the contractor. The passenger train departed at 4pm, with the mail train following at 6.45pm.

It officially closed on 8 February 1976.

The Australian Railway Historical Society (ACT Division) operated the Michelago Tourist Railway from Queanbeyan to Michelago from 1993; however, the deteriorating state of the line meant that services were later truncated to Royalla before being suspended entirely in 2006. The line is now cut immediately north of Michelago railway station by a road cutting through the old railway formation.

== Description ==
The station area has three main areas, general waiting room, ticket office and ladies waiting room, plus sheds, lamp room and the yard area.

== Heritage listing ==
Michelago railway station was listed on the New South Wales State Heritage Register on 2 April 1999.
