= Anzacs Bathing =

1916 painting by George Washington Lambert

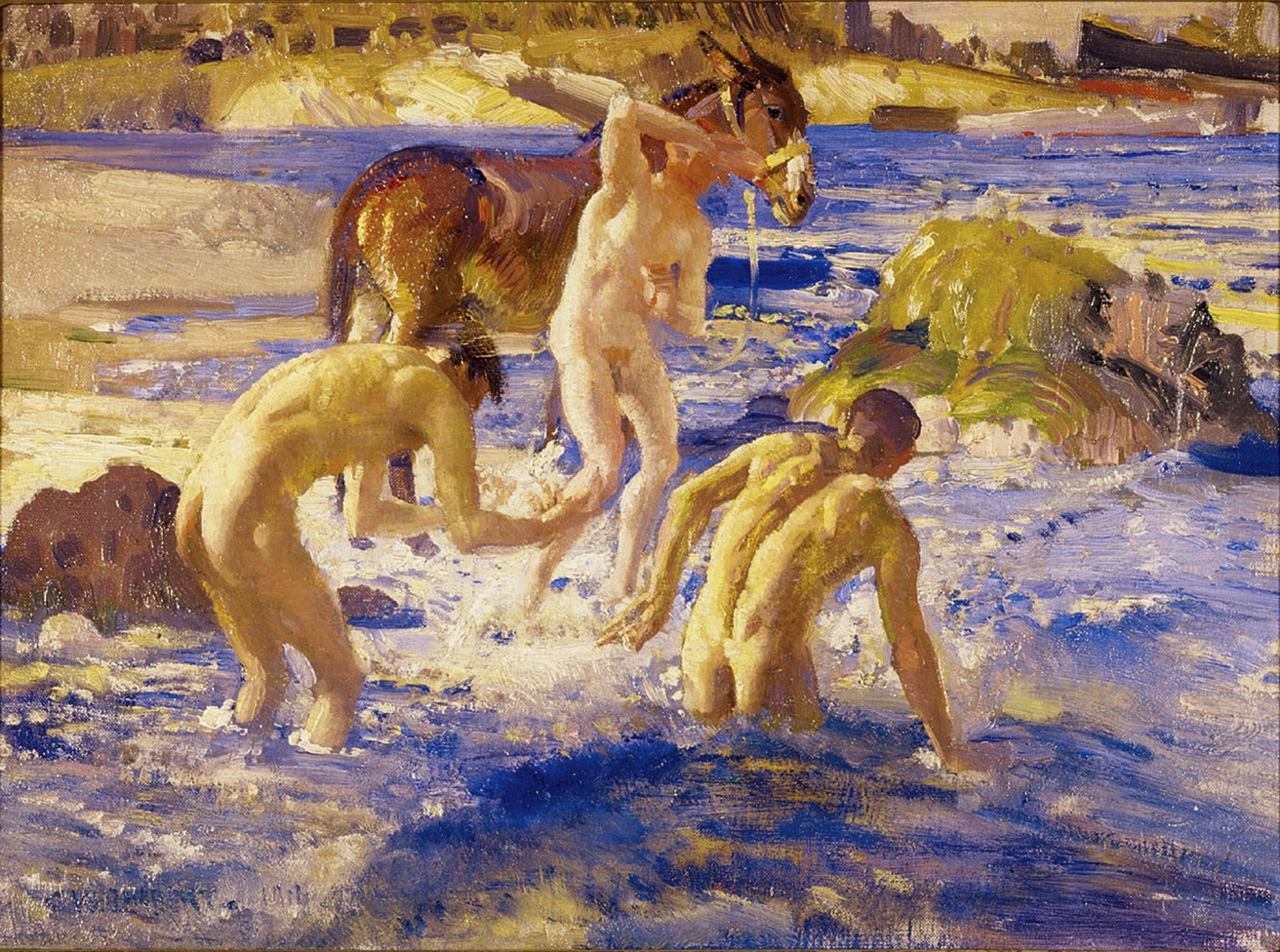
- Artist: George Washington Lambert
- Year: 1916
- Medium: oil on canvas
- Dimensions: 26.3 cm × 36 cm (10.4 in × 14 in)
- Location: Mildura Arts Centre; Mildura

Anzacs Bathing is a 1916 painting by Australian artist George Washington Lambert. The painting depicts three Anzac soldiers bathing at Anzac Cove during the Gallipoli Campaign during World War I.

== Background ==
George Washington Lambert accepted a position as an official war artist from the Australian government in 1917, in the midst of the First World War. In this role, Lambert travelled to Palestine in 1918 and in 1919, after the war's end, to Gallipoli in Turkey. This particular painting is dated 1916 so appears to have been painted from imagination while Lambert was in London.

== Description ==
Three young men frolic in the foaming blue sea, in a break from the brutalities of battle; the light gilds and defines, in scrupulous detail, the musculature of the soldiers’ bodies

— Culture Victoria,

The work references Michelangelo's Battle of Cascina with its image of soldiers bathing and the central figure takes its form from Michelangelo's statue of the Dying Slave.

The painting has been described as an "heroic image of the Anzacs at an early stage in the development of the legend of the brave men of the Australian and New Zealand forces who fought at Gallipoli". The Gallipoli Campaign was fought in the Dardanelles, not far from ancient Troy and in depicting the soldiers naked, Lambert alludes to the heroes and legends of Greek myth. The National Gallery of Australia suggests that this depiction shows the soldiers as "more than men and that they are like Greek gods ..."

The painting is part of the collection of the Mildura Arts Centre, acquired in 1955 as part of the bequest of R. D. Elliot.
