= A Sergeant of the Light Horse =

1920 painting by George Washington Lambert

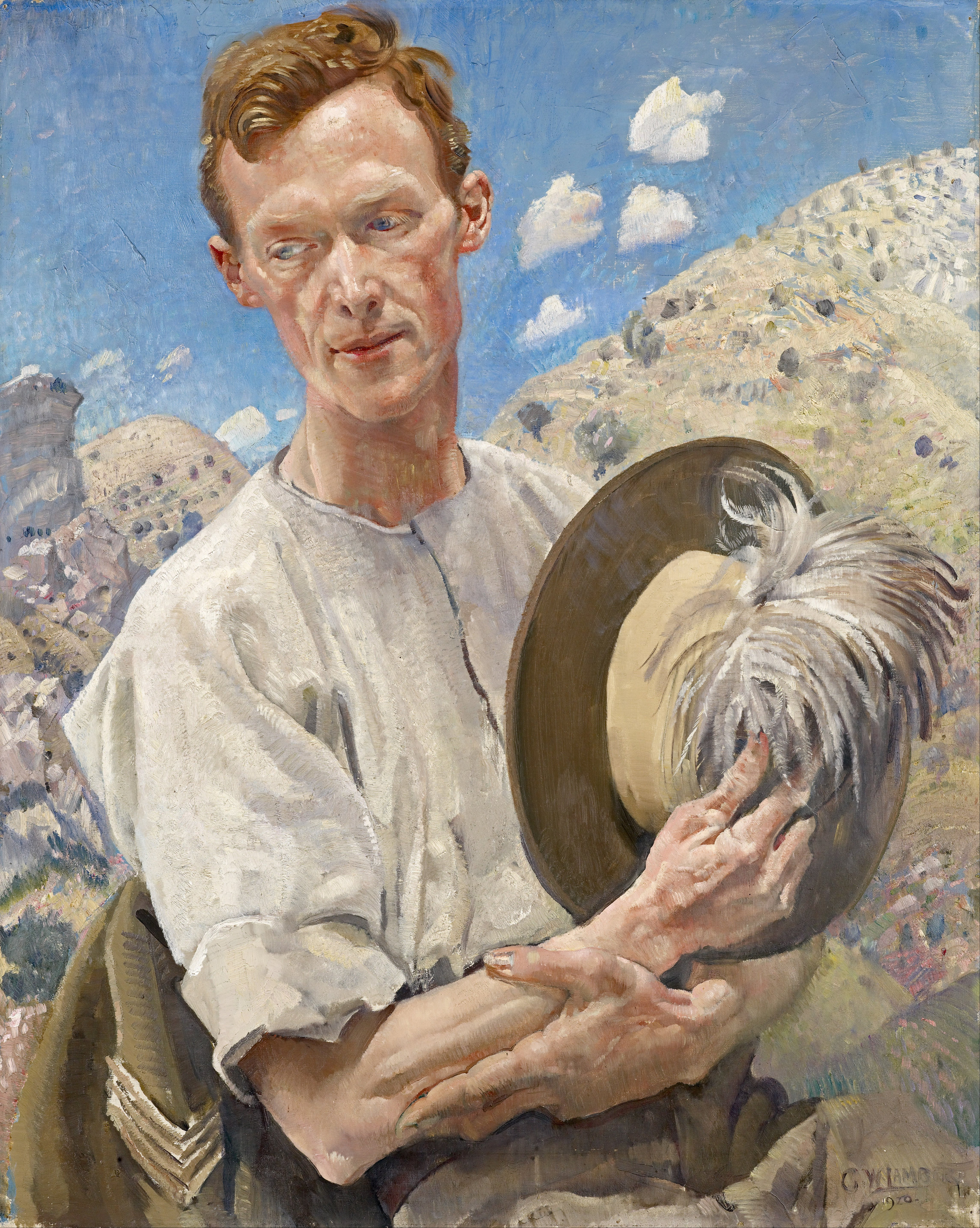
- Artist: George Washington Lambert
- Year: 1920
- Medium: oil on canvas
- Dimensions: 77.0 cm × 62.0 cm (30.3 in × 24.4 in)
- Location: National Gallery of Victoria; Melbourne
- Website: http://www.ngv.vic.gov.au/col/work/5822

A Sergeant of the Light Horse is a 1920 painting by Australian artist George Washington Lambert. The portrait depicts an Australian soldier in Palestine during World War I. The National Gallery of Victoria states that the work is "recognised as an image that captured the spirit and character of the Australian soldier".

== Subject ==
The sitter for the portrait was Thomas Henry (Harry) Ivers, a sergeant with the 1st Signal Squadron of the Australian Light Horse. Lambert met Ivers, a map maker, in Damascus in 1919 and later Ivers was granted permission to assist Lambert in London. The portrait was painted in Lambert's studio in Kensington, London. It is thought that the sitters face was actually that of William Ewart Archibald McLeod (#32933 7th F.A.B.), and the portrait is a composite of him and Thomas Ivers. Both men knew George Lambert.

== Composition ==
When composing the work, Lambert deliberately set out to "created a new model for the military portrait" eschewing the heroic and dashing soldier on horseback. The painting was intended to represent the typical Australian light horseman—mainly men from the farms, dairies and orchards across rural Australia. War correspondent H.S. Gullett wrote of the Australian lighthorseman: "So far as a distinctive type has been evolved it is ... young men long of limb and feature, spare of flesh, easy and almost tired in bearing ... He bears himself modestly ... A felt slouch hat, a shirt with sleeves rolled to the elbows, long trousers".

Reviewing the painting for an exhibition of Lambert's works in 2007, the National Gallery of Australia noted that "Lambert gave this serviceman a sensuousness through his sharp-focus rendering of flesh and musculature, and in the way he portrayed the taut neck and wiry arms." Hans Heysen observed, "the feeling way the eyes have been painted and the expression of that sensitiveness around the mouth are truly wonderful".

The portrait palette, and other features such as the downward look and slender neck, were influenced by the artist's appreciation of the works of Botticelli.

== History ==
The portrait was purchased for the National Gallery of Victoria from the Felton Bequest in 1921, on the advice of its director Bernard Hall. The painting remains part of the National Gallery of Victoria's Australian art collection. It was part of the National Gallery of Victoria's Follow the Flag exhibition in 2015, marking the centenary of ANZAC Day.

The painting appeared on a stamp in 1974.
