= George Washington Lambert =

Australian artist

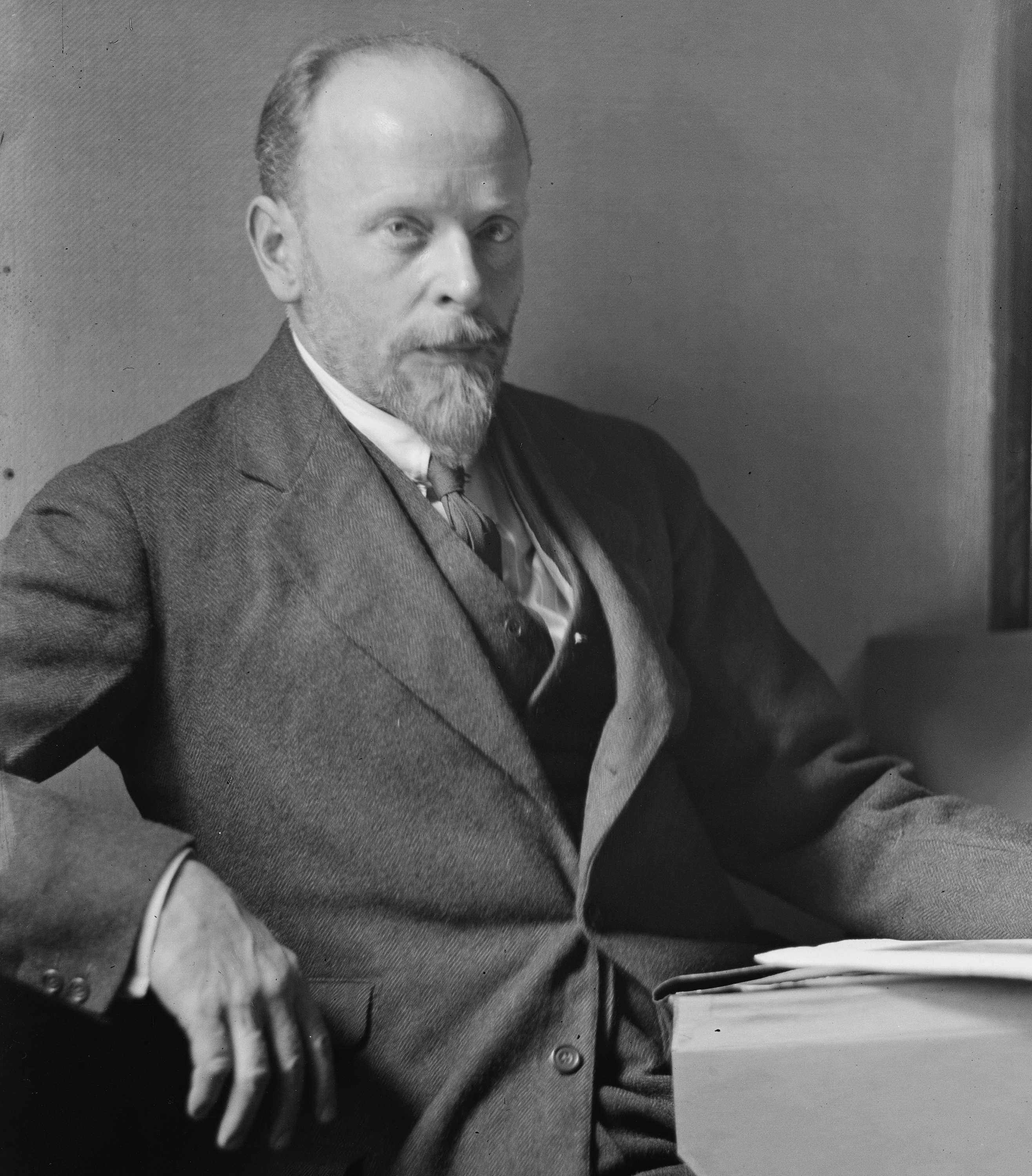
- George Washington Lambert, c.1925, by Harold Cazneaux
- Born: George Washington Lambert; 13 September 1873; Saint Petersburg, Russian Empire
- Died: 29 May 1930 (aged 56); Cobbitty, New South Wales, Australia
- Education: Julian Ashton Art School
- Known for: Painting, drawing, sculpture
- Notable work: Across the Black Soil Plains (1899); Anzac, the Landing 1915 (1922); The Squatter's Daughter (1924); Mrs Annie Murdoch (1927)
- Children: Maurice Lambert, Constant Lambert

George Washington Thomas Lambert ARA (13 September 1873 – 29 May 1930) was an Australian artist, known principally for portrait painting and for being a war artist during the First World War.

== Early life ==
Lambert was born in St Petersburg, Russia, the posthumous son of George Washington Lambert (1833 – 25 July 1873, in London) of Baltimore, Maryland. The younger Lambert's mother was Annie Matilda, née Firth, an Englishwoman. Mother and son moved to Württemberg, Germany, to be with Lambert's maternal grandfather. Lambert attended Kingston College, Yeovil, Somerset. Lambert, his mother, and sister, moved to Australia, arriving in Sydney aboard the Bengal on 20 January 1887.

== Career ==
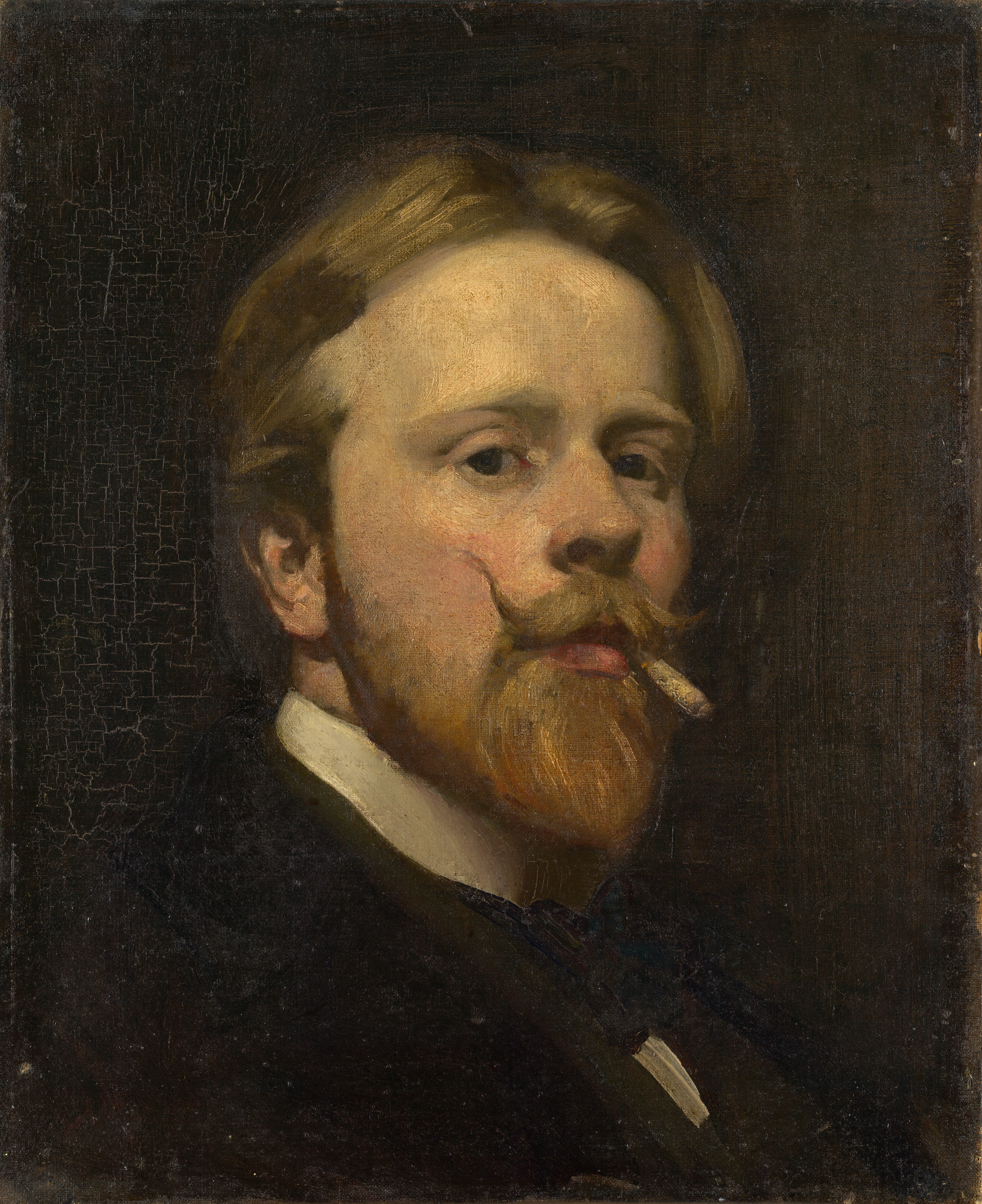
George Washington Lambert - Self-portrait

Lambert began exhibiting his pictures at the Art Society and the Society of Artists, Sydney in 1894. Lambert began contributing pen-and-ink cartoons for The Bulletin in 1895 and began painting full-time in 1896. Illustrations by Lambert formed part of the bush ballads of the Fair girls and gray horses (1898) and Hearts of gold (1903) anthologies of Scottish-Australian poet Will H. Ogilvie (1869–1963).

In 1899 he won the Wynne Prize with Across the Blacksoil Plains. He studied at the Julian Ashton Art School in Sydney until 1900. Later, he won a travelling scholarship for 150 pounds from the government of New South Wales. He spent a year in Paris before moving to London where he exhibited at the Royal Academy. Lambert was awarded a silver medal at an international exhibition for his painting The Sonnet in Barcelona in 1911. He was most known during this time as a portrait artist.

=== War artist ===
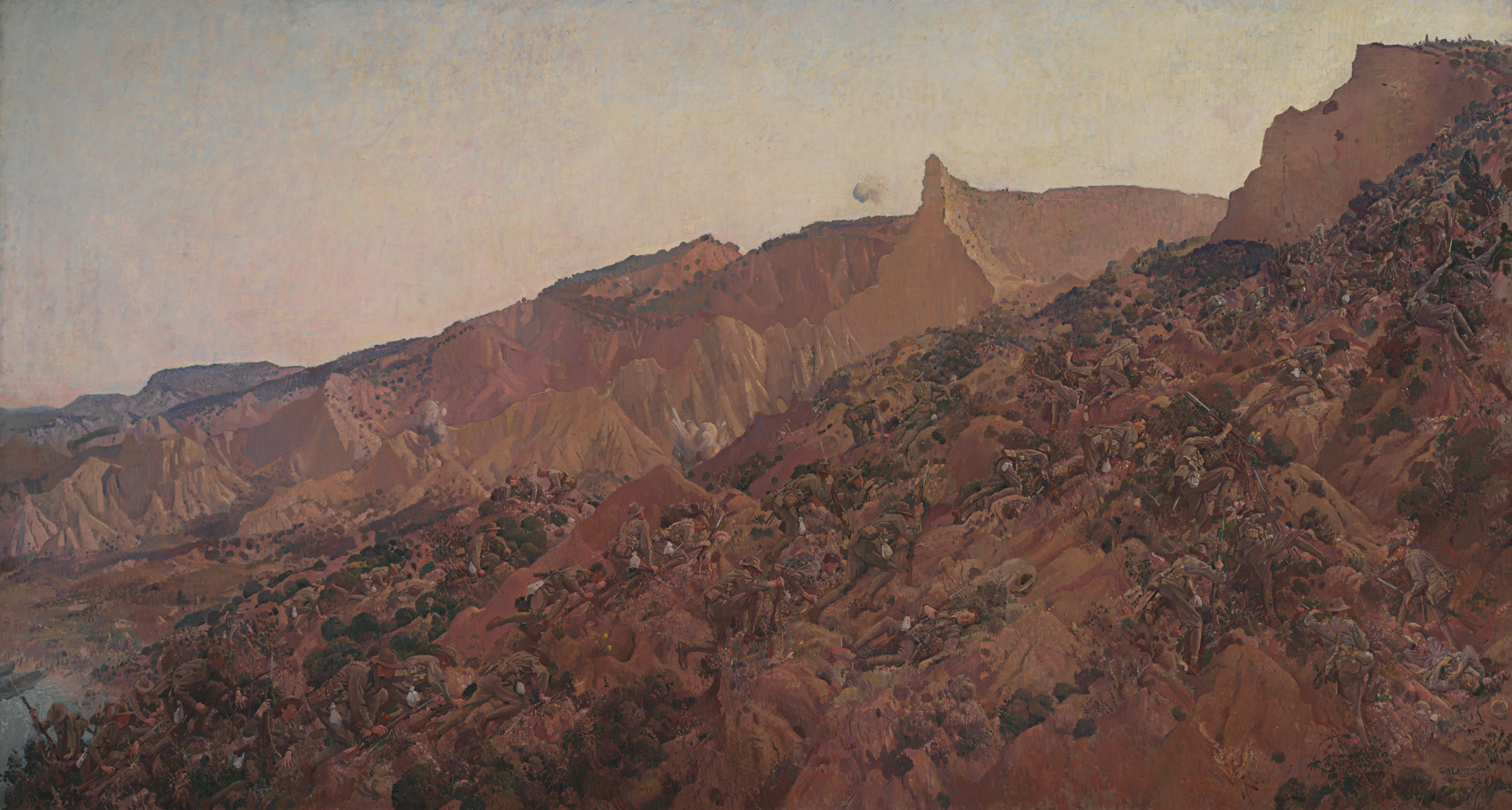
Anzac, the Landing 1915 by George Lambert (1920–1922).

Lambert became an official Australian war artist in 1917 during the First World War. His painting Anzac, the landing 1915 of the landings on the Gallipoli peninsula in Turkey, is the largest painting at the Australian War Memorial collection. Lambert, as an honorary captain, travelled to Gallipoli in 1919 to make sketches for the painting. Another noted work was A sergeant of the Light Horse (1920), painted in London after his travels in Palestine.

During the war years, George Lambert spent much time in London, where it is suggested he was romantically involved with fellow artist Thea Proctor.

=== Return to Australia ===
Lambert returned to Australia in 1921, where he had success in Melbourne with a one-man show at Fine Art Society gallery. He was elected an associate of the Royal Academy in 1922. He often visited the homestead of Colonel Granville Ryrie of the Australian Light Horse at Michelago, New South Wales and there painted The Squatter's Daughter and Michelago Landscape.

In the second annual Archibald Prize in 1922, now Australia's most prestigious art prize for portraiture, Lambert's work was disqualified as he had not been a resident in Australia for twelve months. He submitted a self-portrait for the third year, competing with William Macleod who entered with the subject of The Bulletin cartoonist 'Hop' Hopkins. In 1927 he won the Archibald Prize with Mrs Annie Murdoch, a portrait of the mother of Keith Murdoch and grandmother of Rupert Murdoch.

In November 1927 he was commissioned to create a statue of writer Henry Lawson; the work depicting Lawson in rough clothes accompanied by a swagman, a dog and a fence post was unveiled in The Domain, Sydney on 28 July 1931 by the Governor of New South Wales, Sir Philip Game.

== Personal life ==
Lambert married Amelia Beatrice 'Amy' Absell (1872–1963) in 1900. Their children were Maurice Lambert (1901–1964), a noted sculptor and associate of the Royal Academy, and Constant, the British composer and conductor, born in London in 1905. Kit Lambert (1935–1981), manager of the rock group The Who, was their grandchild.

Lambert died on 29 May 1930 at Cobbitty, near Camden, New South Wales, and is buried in the Anglican section of South Head Cemetery.

Some of his family papers from 1874 to 1942 are held in the State Library of New South Wales, Sydney.

His life was dramatised in an episode of the radio series Famous Australians.

== List of works ==
Table featuring paintings by George Washington Lambery
Image	Title	Year	Medium	Dimensions	Collection	Ref.
	A Bush Idyll	1896	Oil on canvas	48 by 78 centimetres (19 in × 31 in)	Art Gallery of New South Wales, Sydney	
	Across the Black Soil Plains	1899	Oil on canvas	91.6 by 305.5 centimetres (36.1 in × 120.3 in)	Art Gallery of New South Wales, Sydney	
	George Washington Lambert	c. 1900	Oil on canvas	45.7 by 36.8 centimetres (18.0 in × 14.5 in)	National Portrait Gallery, London	
	Mother and child	1901	Oil on canvas on hardboard	64.1 by 53.3 centimetres (25.2 in × 21.0 in)	Art Gallery of New South Wales, Sydney	
	Hugh Ramsay	c. 1902	Oil on canvas	46.0 by 38.0 centimetres (18.1 in × 15.0 in)	Art Gallery of New South Wales, Sydney	
	La Guitariste	1902	Oil on canvas	99.0 by 80.0 centimetres (39.0 in × 31.5 in)	Art Gallery of New South Wales, Sydney	
	Miss Thea Proctor	1903	Oil on canvas	90.0 by 69.8 centimetres (35.4 in × 27.5 in)	Art Gallery of New South Wales, Sydney	
	Sybil Waller in a red and gold dress	1905	Oil on canvas	76.2 by 63.5 centimetres (30.0 in × 25.0 in)	Private collection	
	The Three Kimonos	1905	Oil on canvas	76.0 by 106.8 centimetres (29.9 in × 42.0 in)	Art Gallery of New South Wales, Sydney	
	Derwent Wood and Family	1905	Oil on cedar panel	24.1 by 32.5 centimetres (9.5 in × 12.8 in)	Art Gallery of Western Australia, Perth	
	Francis Derwent Wood	1906	Oil on canvas	61.0 by 50.8 centimetres (24.0 in × 20.0 in)	National Portrait Gallery, London	
	Lotty and a lady	1906	Oil on canvas	102.8 by 127.7 centimetres (40.5 in × 50.3 in)	National Gallery of Victoria, Melbourne	
	Self-portrait	c. 1906	Oil on canvas	46.3 by 38.2 centimetres (18.2 in × 15.0 in)	National Gallery of Victoria, Melbourne	
	The Gift	1906	Oil on canvas	33.9 by 52.7 centimetres (13.3 in × 20.7 in)	Art Gallery of New South Wales, Sydney	
	The Sonnet	1907	Oil on canvas	113.3 by 177.4 centimetres (44.6 in × 69.8 in)	National Gallery of Australia, Canberra	
	The holiday group (The bathers)	1907	Oil on canvas	90.7 by 78.7 centimetres (35.7 in × 31.0 in)	Art Gallery of South Australia, Adelaide	
	Gold prospectors	1907	Watercolour	33.7 by 44.8 centimetres (13.3 in × 17.6 in)	Art Gallery of New South Wales, Sydney	
	Portrait Group	1908	Oil on canvas	184 by 184 centimetres (72 in × 72 in)	National Gallery of Australia, Canberra	
	The Bride	1908	Oil on wood	53.0 by 40.6 centimetres (20.9 in × 16.0 in)	Art Gallery of New South Wales, Sydney	
	Children bathing	1909	Oil on wood	53.3 by 40.5 centimetres (21.0 in × 15.9 in)	Art Gallery of New South Wales, Sydney	
	The shop	1909	Oil on canvas	71.0 by 91.5 centimetres (28.0 in × 36.0 in)	Art Gallery of New South Wales, Sydney	
	Chesham Street	1910	Oil on canvas	62 by 51.5 centimetres (24.4 in × 20.3 in)	National Gallery of Australia, Canberra	
	Holiday in Essex	1910	Oil on canvas	183.8 by 230.6 centimetres (72.4 in × 90.8 in)	Art Gallery of New South Wales, Sydney	
	William Alison Russell Esq	1910	Oil on canvas	127.2 by 101.7 centimetres (50.1 in × 40.0 in)	National Gallery of Victoria, Melbourne	
	Pan Is Dead (Still Life)	1911	Oil on canvas	76.5 by 63.5 centimetres (30.1 in × 25.0 in)	Art Gallery of New South Wales, Sydney	
	Portrait of a lady (The dancer)	1911	Oil on canvas	61.3 by 51.0 centimetres (24.1 in × 20.1 in)	Art Gallery of New South Wales, Sydney	
	Portrait of Maurice Lambert	1913	Oil on canvas	61.0 by 50.8 centimetres (24.0 in × 20.0 in)	Art Gallery of New South Wales, Sydney	
	The Belle of the Alley	1913	Oil on canvas	50.7 by 40.5 centimetres (20.0 in × 15.9 in)	Art Gallery of New South Wales, Sydney	
	The Dark Red Shawl	1913	Oil on wood	41.6 by 32.4 centimetres (16.4 in × 12.8 in)	Art Gallery of New South Wales, Sydney	
	Important People	1914, 1921	Oil on canvas	134.7 by 171 centimetres (53.0 in × 67.3 in)	Art Gallery of New South Wales, Sydney	
	The Maid	1915	Oil on canvas	91.4 by 71.1 centimetres (36.0 in × 28.0 in)	Art Gallery of New South Wales, Sydney	
	Anzacs Bathing	1916	Oil on canvas	26.3 by 36 centimetres (10.4 in × 14.2 in)	Mildura Arts Centre, Mildura	
	Portrait of a lady (Thea Proctor)	1916	Oil on canvas	45.8 by 38.1 centimetres (18.0 in × 15.0 in)	Art Gallery of New South Wales, Sydney	
	The convex mirror	c. 1916	Oil on canvas	50-centimetre (20 in) diameter	State Library of New South Wales, Sydney	
	Mrs E.P. Reed	1917	Oil on canvas	76.6 by 64.5 centimetres (30.2 in × 25.4 in)	National Gallery of Victoria, Melbourne	
	Sir Walter Baldwin Spencer	1917, 1921	Oil on canvas	91.2 by 71.4 centimetres (35.9 in × 28.1 in)	Museums Victoria, Melbourne	
	With the Light Horse in Egypt	1918	Oil on canvas	71.0 by 91.2 centimetres (28.0 in × 35.9 in)	National Gallery of Victoria, Melbourne	
	The Road to Jericho	1918	Oil on canvas	30.7 by 40.74 centimetres (12.09 in × 16.04 in)	Art Gallery of New South Wales, Sydney	
	A Sergeant of the Light Horse	1920	Oil on canvas	77.0 by 62.0 centimetres (30.3 in × 24.4 in)	National Gallery of Victoria, Melbourne	
	Trewarmitt, Cornish landscape	1920	Oil on canvas	50.8 by 76.2 centimetres (20.0 in × 30.0 in)	Art Gallery of New South Wales, Sydney	
	Tulips and wild hyacinths	c. 1920	Oil on plywood	60.7 by 52.0 centimetres (23.9 in × 20.5 in)	Art Gallery of New South Wales, Sydney	
	Weighing the Fleece	1921	Oil on canvas	71.7 by 91.8 centimetres (28.2 in × 36.1 in)	National Gallery of Australia, Canberra	
	The official artist	1921	Oil on canvas	91.7 by 71.5 centimetres (36.1 in × 28.1 in)	National Gallery of Victoria, Melbourne	
	The White Glove	1921	Oil on canvas	106.0 by 78.0 centimetres (41.7 in × 30.7 in)	Art Gallery of New South Wales, Sydney	
	Portrait of a girl in a brown dress	1921	Oil on canvas	99.5 by 71.0 centimetres (39.2 in × 28.0 in)	Art Gallery of Western Australia, Perth	
	Anzac, the Landing 1915	1922	Oil on canvas	190.5 by 350.5 centimetres (75.0 in × 138.0 in)	Australian War Memorial, Canberra	
	Self-portrait with gladioli	1922	Oil on canvas	128.2 by 102.8 centimetres (50.5 in × 40.5 in)	National Portrait Gallery, Canberra	
	Yarra Glen	1922	Oil on plywood	33.0 by 41.1 centimetres (13.0 in × 16.2 in)	Art Gallery of New South Wales, Sydney	
	Yarra Glen	1922	Oil on plywood	33.0 by 41.1 centimetres (13.0 in × 16.2 in)	Art Gallery of New South Wales, Sydney	
	Hera	1924	Oil on canvas	127.87 by 102.5 centimetres (50.34 in × 40.35 in)	National Gallery of Victoria, Melbourne	
	Charles EW Bean	1924	Oil on canvas	90.7 by 71.1 centimetres (35.7 in × 28.0 in)	Australian War Memorial, Canberra	
	George Judah Cohen	1925	Oil on canvas	147.0 by 122.5 centimetres (57.9 in × 48.2 in)	National Portrait Gallery, Canberra	
	Egg and cauliflower still life	1926	Oil on canvas	34.3 by 44.1 centimetres (13.5 in × 17.4 in)	Art Gallery of South Australia, Adelaide	
	Tulips and other stimulants	1927	Oil on canvas	52.1 by 60.6 centimetres (20.5 in × 23.9 in)	Art Gallery of New South Wales, Sydney	
	Mrs Annie Murdoch	1927	Oil on canvas	23.5 by 19.5 centimetres (9.3 in × 7.7 in)	Murdoch family collection	
	War memorial	1927	Bronze sculpture		Geelong Grammar School, Geelong	
	Julian Ashton	1928	Oil on canvas	127.0 by 103.0 centimetres (50.0 in × 40.6 in)	Art Gallery of New South Wales, Sydney	
	Swedish athlete	1928	Oil on canvas	51.0 by 40.7 centimetres (20.1 in × 16.0 in)	Art Gallery of New South Wales, Sydney	

== Gallery ==
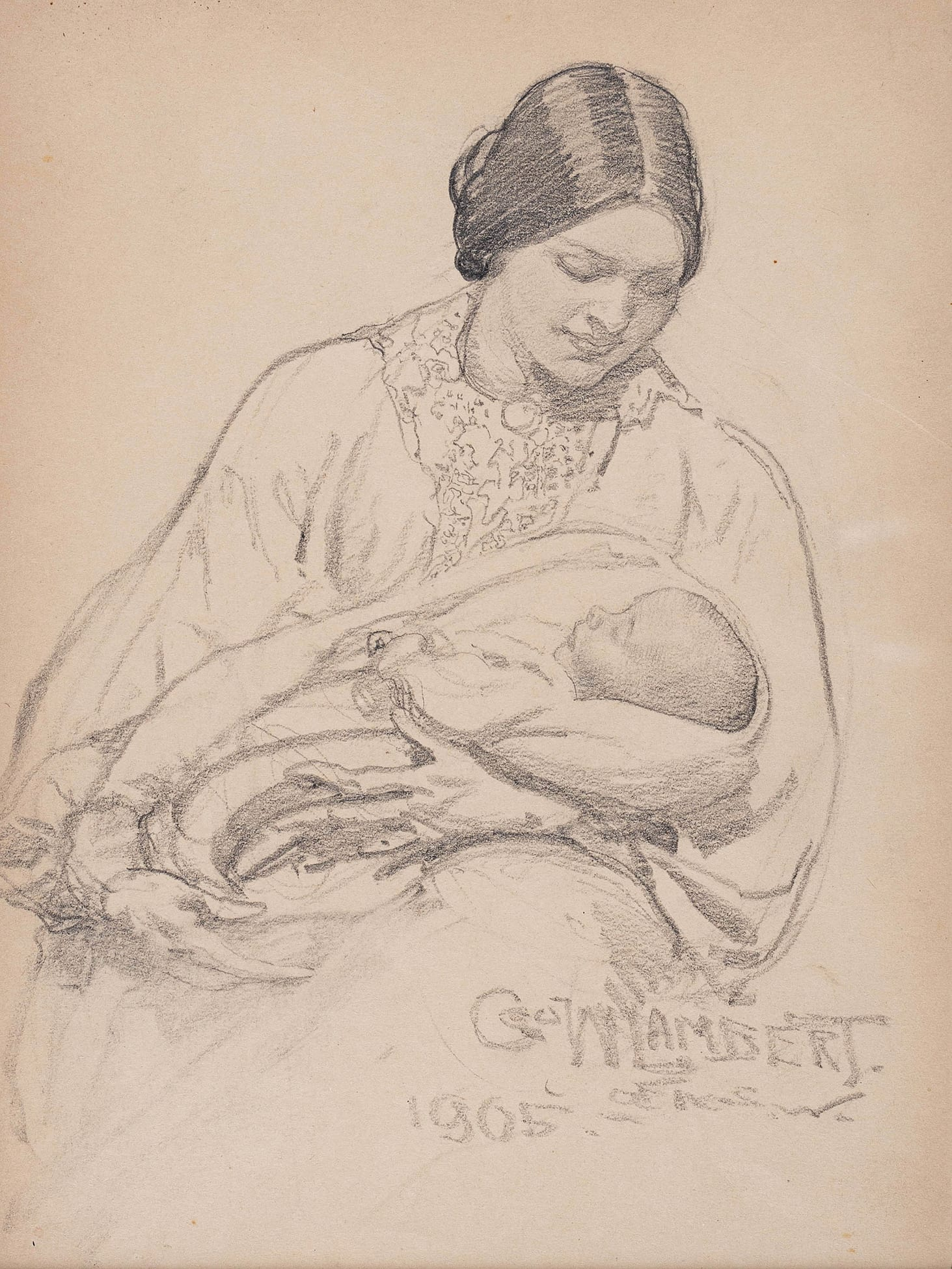
The artist's wife, Amy, and their son Constant

== See also ==
- Australian art

== Notes ==
Awards
Preceded by William Beckwith McInnes	Archibald Prize; 1927 for Mrs Annie Murdoch	Succeeded by John Longstaff
