= The Sonnet (Lambert) =

1907 painting by George Washington Lambert

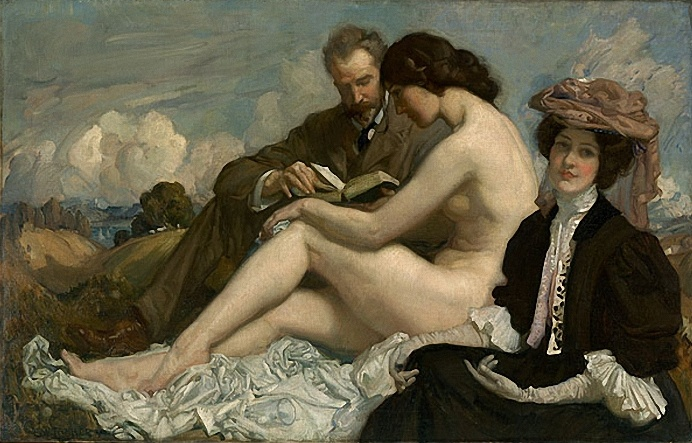
- Artist: George Washington Lambert
- Year: 1907
- Medium: oil on canvas
- Dimensions: 113.3 cm × 177.4 cm (44.6 in × 69.8 in)
- Location: National Gallery of Australia, Canberra
- Website: Official website

The Sonnet is a 1907 oil-on-canvas painting by Australian artist George Washington Lambert. The work depicts man reading a sonnet to a female companion with both seemingly unaware of a nude woman sitting between them. The open-air idyll draws on other well-known works such as Manet's Le Déjeuner sur l'herbe 1863.

Lambert painted the work while in London. Fellow expatriates Arthur Streeton and Thea Proctor were the models for the clothed persons and Kitty Powell was the model for the nude.

One day when I saw these three people together … it seemed to me a modernized version of Giorgione's [possibly Titian’s] Fete Champetre

— Lambert,

The painting won a silver medal at the Exposicion Internacional de Arte in Barcelona in 1911.
