= Michelago =

- Town
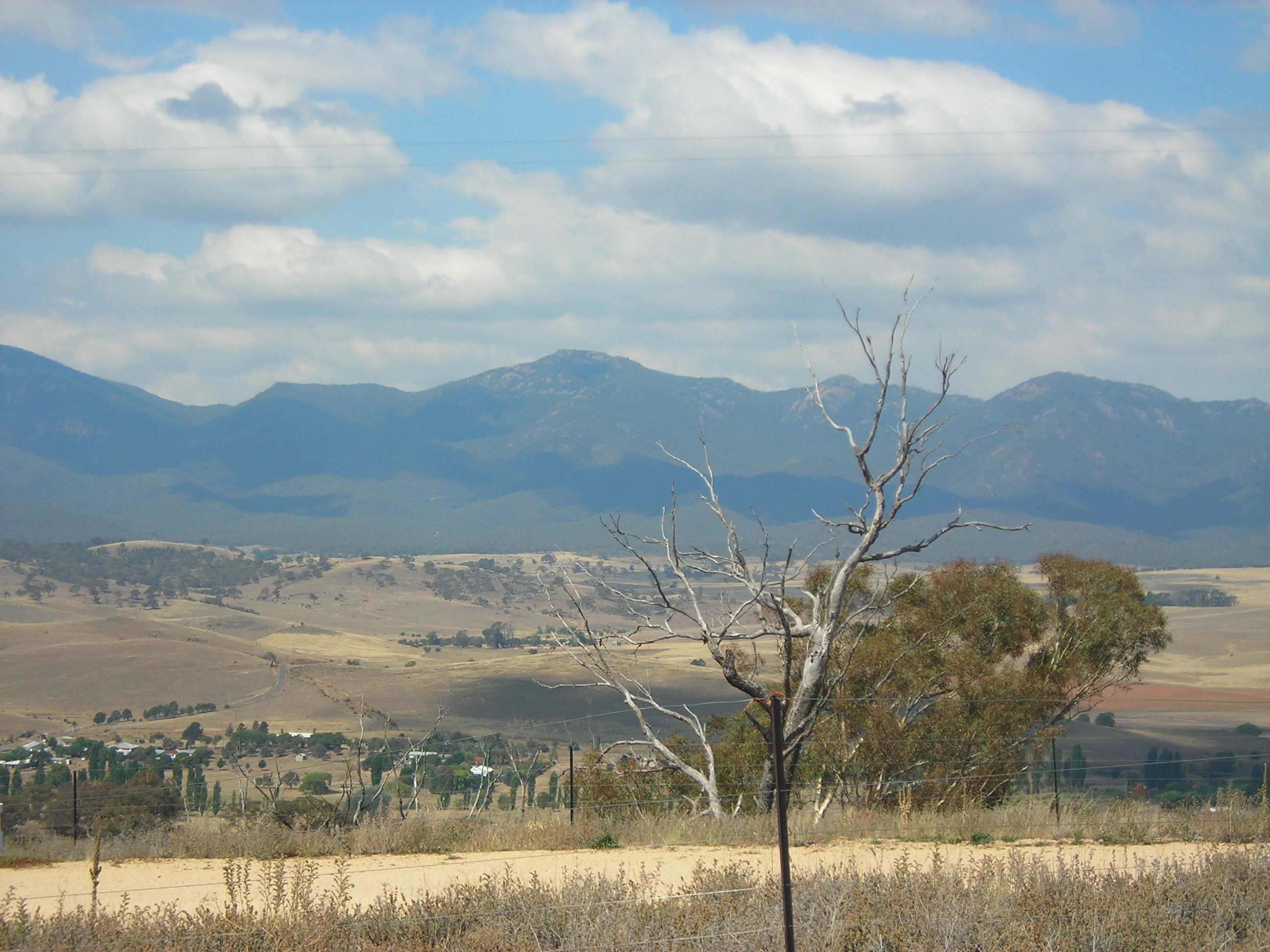
- View from Loorungah, Clearview Road 2009

- Interactive map of Michelago
- Coordinates: 35°43′13″S 149°9′27″E
- Country: Australia
- State: New South Wales
- LGA: Snowy Monaro Regional Council
- Location: 336 km (209 mi) SW of Sydney; 54 km (34 mi) S of Canberra; 63 km (39 mi) N of Cooma

Government
  - State electorate: Monaro
  - Federal division: Eden-Monaro
- Elevation: 800 m (2,600 ft)

Population
  - Total: 642 (2021 census)
- Postcode: 2620
- County: Murray; Beresford
- Parish: Michelago; Monkellan
Localities around Michelago
The Angle	Williamsdale	Burra
Clear Range	Michelago	Tinderry
Bumbalong	Colinton	Jerangle

Michelago /mɪkəˈleɪɡoʊ/ is a village in the Monaro region of New South Wales, Australia. The village is in the Snowy Monaro Regional Council local government area, 54 kilometres (34 mi) south of Canberra on the Monaro Highway. It was founded in the 1820s, on the main route from Sydney to the Snowy Mountains. Its name is also applied to the surrounding area, for postal and statistical purposes. At the 2021 census, Michelago had a population of 642.

== Location ==
Michelago is situated in a valley between two mountain ranges, the Tinderry Range to the East and the Clear Range to the west. The Tinderry Road crosses the Tinderry range from Michelago, leading ultimately to the 1950s silver mining settlement Captains Flat. The highest peaks in the picturesque Tinderry Range reach approximately 1600m above sea level, while Michelago itself has an elevation of around 800m. The Murrumbidgee River separates the village from the Clear Range. The Michelago Creek passes through the village, and is a source of water for the residents. Its catchment area is in the Tinderry Range, and after passing the town the creek flows into the Murrumbidgee River. It has been claimed that Michelago represents the territorial divide between white-backed and black-backed magpies on the Monaro Highway from Canberra to Cooma.

== History and bushranging ==
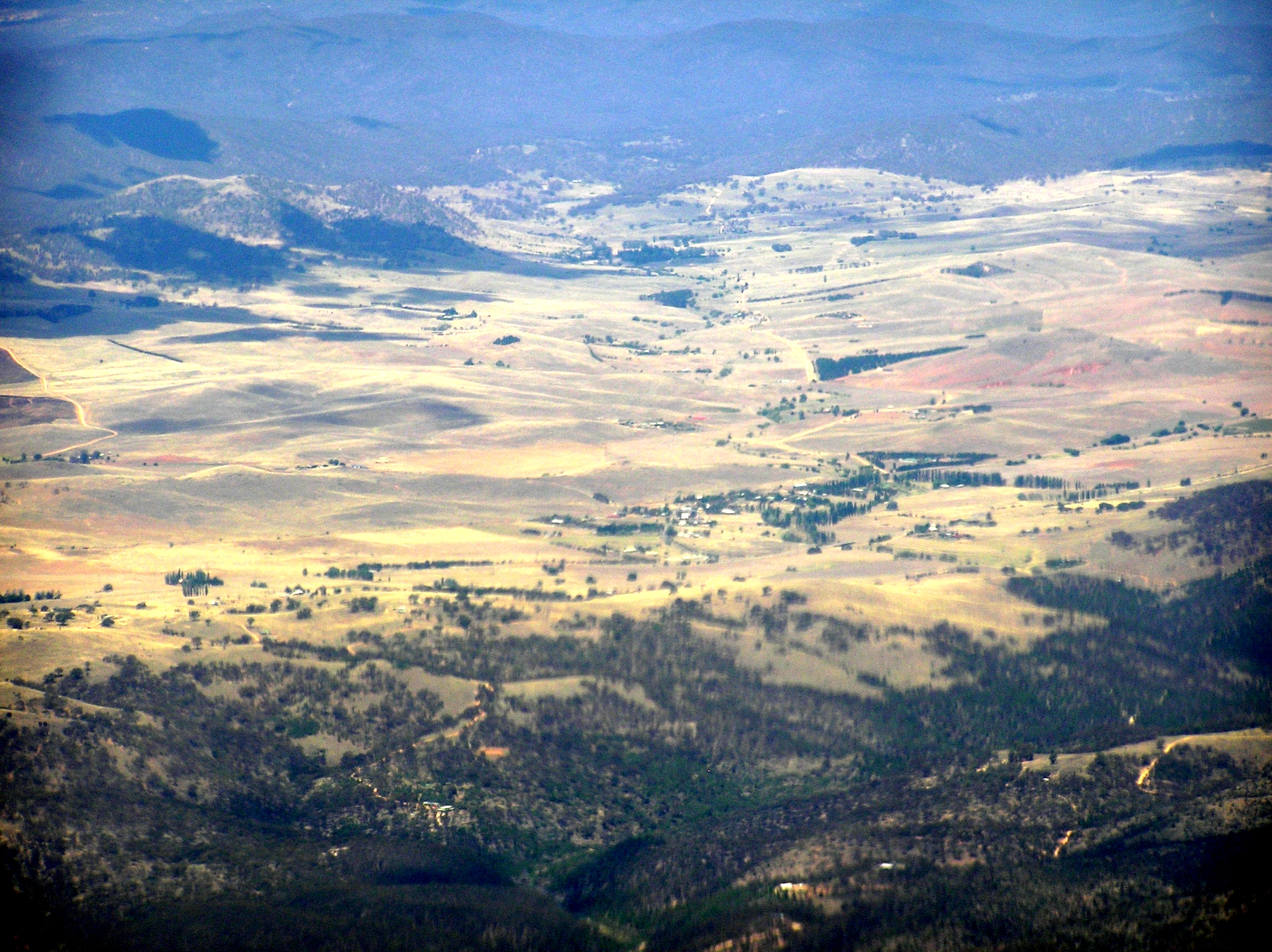
North west aerial view

The area later known as Michelago lies within the traditional lands of the Ngarigo people.

Currie and Ovens explored the Michelago region in 1823 and the first settlement proceeded soon thereafter, involving the ex-convict couple, Emmanuel and Catherine( Aherne Sullivan) Elliot. The explorer Dr John Lhotsky claimed that his journey in 1834 south from the Limestone Plains toward Michelago represented a descent into what he considered barbarism: no church south of Sutton Forest, no window pane south of Canberra, no white woman south of Michelago.

Six hundred and forty acres of Crown Land at "Meccaligo" were advertised to be sold on 9 December 1835. The community was served by a licensed Inn by 1850.

The first Monaro Superintendent of Police, the Corsican Francis Nicholas Rossi, built an ironbark slab homestead in the region called Micilago on 35,000 acres (14,175 hectares) in 1837; this station was bought in 1859 by Alexander Ryrie who married Charlotte Faunce the daughter of Alured Tasker Faunce the police magistrate at Queanbeyan; one of their children being Granville Ryrie, later a General in World War I, knighted and involved with the League of Nations in Geneva. Alexander Ryrie kept the name Micalago for his station, but advocated that new village name be spelt "Michelago" in the hope of avoiding confusion between the Station and the township. He had some influence here and the two spellings diverged. Both Michelago and Micalago are pronounced the same. Alexander built St Thomas' church in the village of Michelago and life for those in the area was very self-sufficient, with income from wool, cattle for meat, milk and butter, locally grown fruit and vegetables, with soap and tallow candles also being made by hand.

A big social event was the picnic races and over 200 people attended the Michelago Public School picnic in 1906. During the 1930-50's eucalyptus stilling was a profitable occupation in the Tinderry Range above Michelago and a drum of eucalyptus oil (44 gallons or 200L) was worth 100 pounds on site in the 1940s. Notable families of the early years of Michelago include the Kellys, Cotters, Shanahans, Lawlers, McTernans and Poveys. Many of their descendants still live in the region.

Lea-Scarlett notes that in October 1840 a gang of five bushrangers broke out of the lockup at Queanbeyan and police magistrate Captain Faunce had to give chase to Michelago before he recaptured them. On 1 June 1866 a bushranging gang consisting of the Clarke brothers, Patsy Connell and two accomplices held up Michelago town (which then consisted of Thomas Kennedy's Hibernian Hotel, a police station and lockup, Abraham Levy's store, a Catholic school house and church and a few houses) and drank its entire liquor supply before staggering off to their rocky hide-out called 'Beefcask' in the Tinderrys.

In February 1866, two armed men robbed the post office, destroyed the letters and escaped with three horses, one of them a race horse.

St Patrick's Catholic Church was a small building made of stone. It was too small for its congregation by 1906 and it was decided to build a new brick church. The foundation stone for the Michelago Memorial Church was laid in October 1906. Some 75,000 bricks were used made from local red clay. The building was roofed with slate. The cost of construction was £1,134 and six shillings, of which £50 was the architects fee. The architect was James Nangle and the builder Mr J. G. Taylor, both of Sydney. The building had seating for 150 people and it was officially opened on 28 April 1907.

== Railway ==
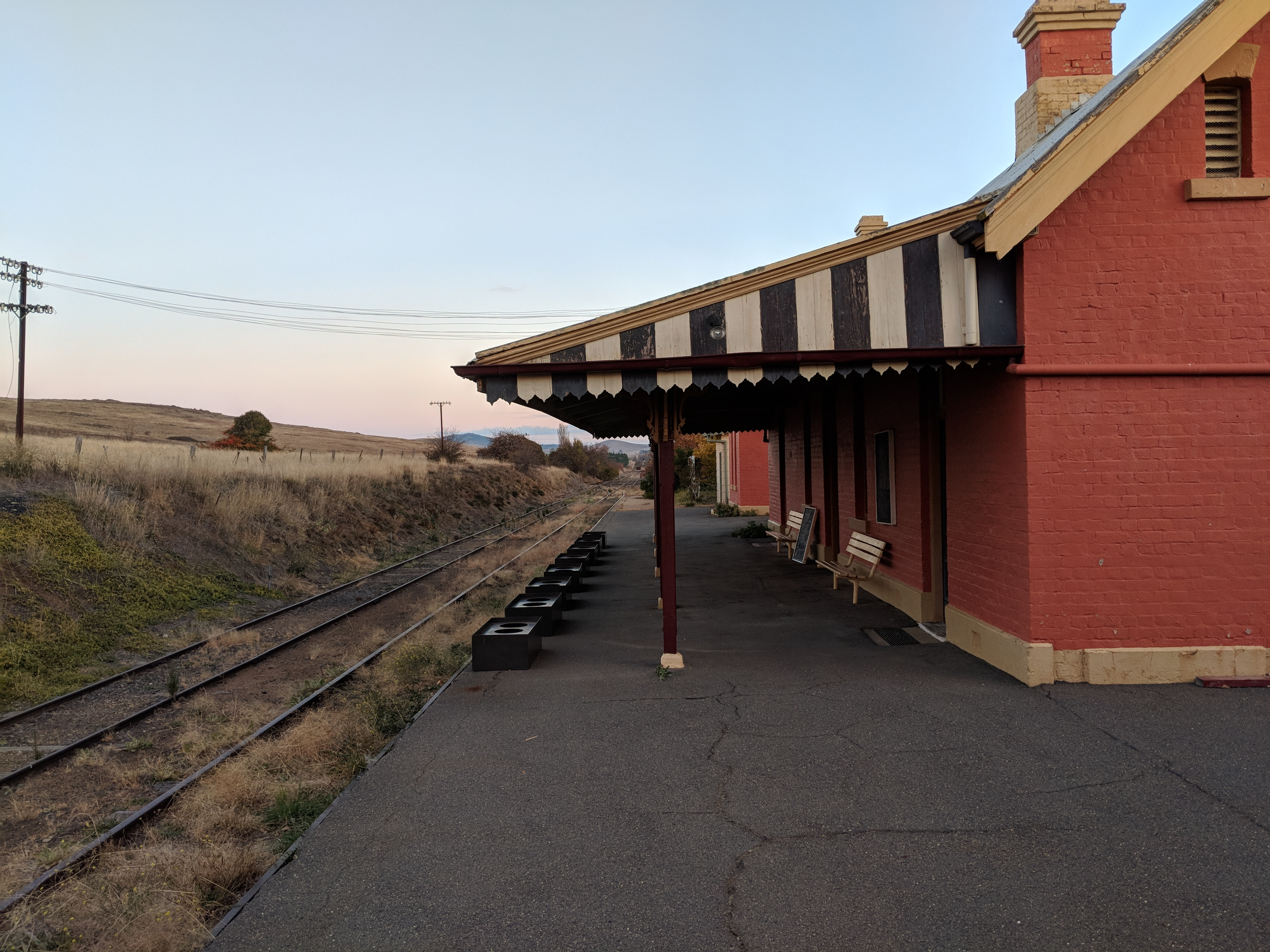
Michelago station

The railway to the town opened on 7 December 1887 and Bernard Ferris's railway pub at Michelago established during the construction period was called the 'Navvies' Arms'. In the 1920s Michelago was visited by the Great White Train with fifteen exhibition coaches encouraging people to 'Buy Australian Made'. The railway line closed in 1989—along with the rest of the line from Queanbeyan to Cooma. From 1993 until 1997, the Australian Railway Historical Society ACT Division operated the line to Michelago as a heritage railway. However, as the line deteriorated, services were truncated to Royalla (approx 23 kilometres (14 mi) north). Due to significant damage to some of the older wooden bridges in the 2010 floods near Queanbeyan, the ARHS ACT is unlikely ever to run to Michelago again. The railway was cut in July 2016 by the removal of a bridge over a road just to the north of Michelago station. To the south, the railway is also disused between Michelago and Chakola, and a 1990s resurfacing of the Monaro Highway north of Bredbo, severed where the railway crossed the highway.

== Heritage listings ==
Michelago has a number of heritage-listed sites, including:

- Goulburn–Bombala railway: Ingalara Creek railway bridge, Michelago
- Goulburn–Bombala railway: Michelago railway station

== Michelago in art, poetry and film ==
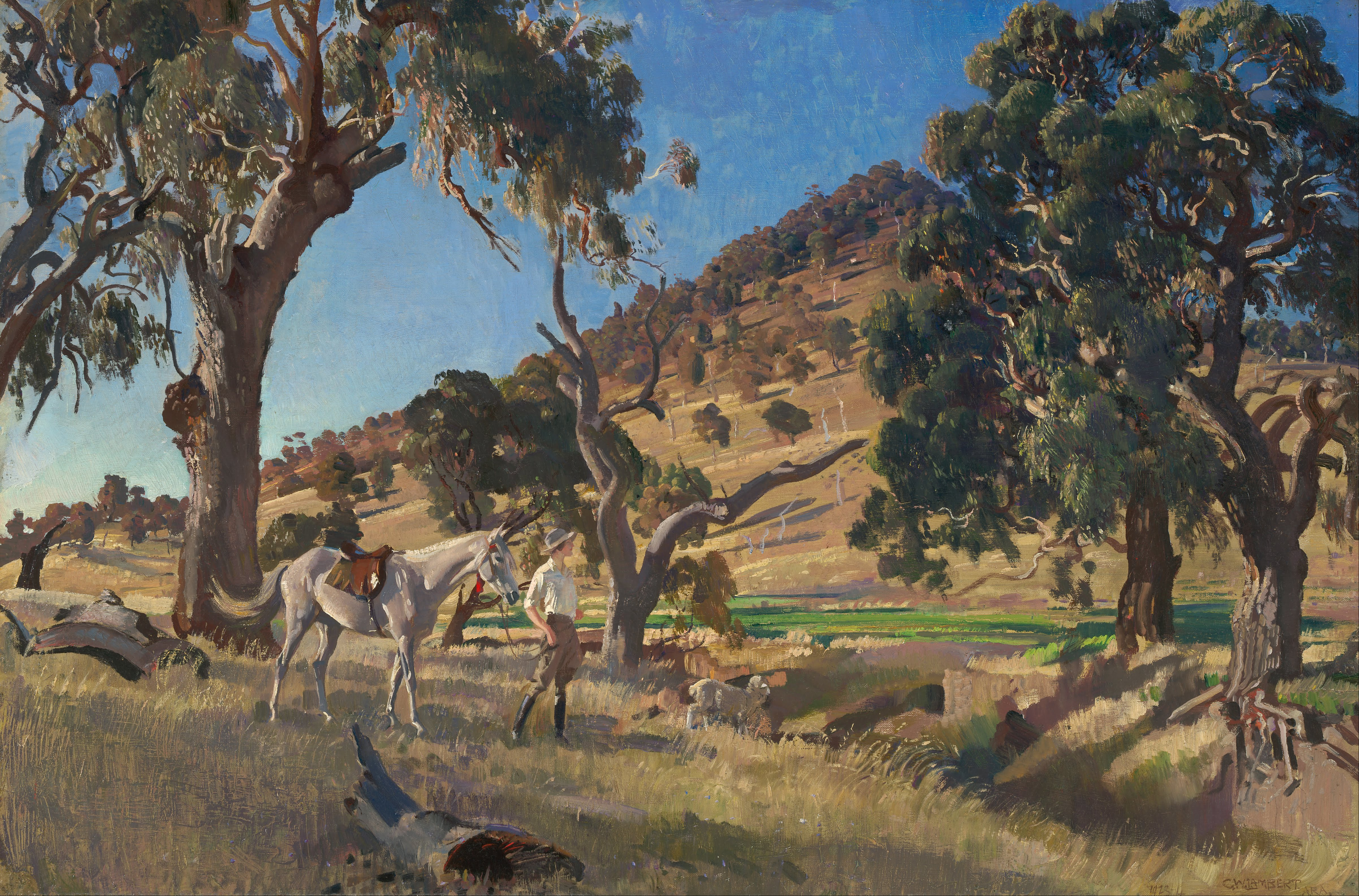
George Lambert. The Squatter's Daughter-Michelago 1923

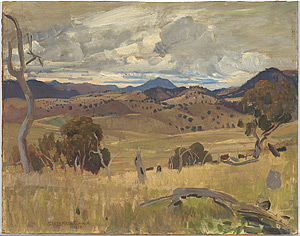
George Lambert. Michelago Landscape. 1923

The George Washington Lambert painting The Squatter's Daughter was painted at Michelago. Lambert also painted Michelago Landscape (both paintings are in the National Gallery of Australia collection) and wrote this poem about it:

"The sun is down and 'Micalago' is at rest
Like Chinese silk of faded gold, the grass and all the hills like breasts of turtle-doves
My soul could find a home 'midst blades of grass
And get its music from the whispering trees
These pleasant little hills that lure us on
To ride and ride until we reach beyond."

David Campbell wrote a poem The Squatter's Daughter about the funerals of Granville Ryrie and his daughter at Michelago:

"Veterans shed tears and limped the sweet-briar miles
Behind his guncarriage to Michelago
And now The Squatter's Daughter follows him:
The grey lake blurs beneath
Governor's Hill, her candid spirit mourned
By grandchildren with hair of daffodil."

The artist Robert Pengilley lives and paints in the Michelago region. In 1986 a painting of Ryrie's Creek by Pengilley was presented as a gift from the Australian Government to the People's Republic of China. Another of his works Storm over the Tinderrys is held by the Australian National University in Canberra.

The 1999 film Passion, about the life of Percy Grainger was partly filmed in Michelago. The 2004 Cate Shortland film Somersault included scenes filmed at the Ryrie homestead at Michelago; scenes from the Gillian Armstrong 1979 film My Brilliant Career were also shot at that location.

== Bushfires ==
There was a big bushfire in the Tinderry Range in November 1957 which burnt out 90% of the reserve and was not contained until 24 December. In January 2003, bushfires ravaged the Canberra region and, spreading from Namadgi National Park, devastated much of the flora and bush landscape around Michelago, particularly down from the Clearview Road toward the Murrumbidgee River. While the village itself was not affected by the fires, several farms and houses were destroyed and mountains of the Clear Range were left blackened and barren. A bushfire which began on 17 December 2009 devastated the area east of Michelago, burning out over 9,000 hectares and destroying three homes and a sawmill.

== Notable residents ==
- Garrett Cotter
- Alexander Ryrie
- Granville Ryrie
- George De Salis

== Future development proposal ==
Canberra-based developer Geocon has plans to develop land at Michelago into what would be another cross-border satellite suburb of Canberra. The development would change the nature of the village, but may also bring long-awaited infrastructure to the area.

== Sources ==
- Lea-Scarlett, E. (1968) Queanbeyan. District and People, Queanbeyan Municipal Council.
- Vincent, P. My Darling Mick. The Life of Granville Ryrie 1865–1937, National Library of Australia, Canberra 1997. ISBN 0-642-10667-3.
