= Parish of Monkellan =

New South Wales parish

Monkellan Parish is a civil parish of Murray County, New South Wales.

Monkellan is located at 35°39′54″S 149°12′04″E and is on the Monaro Highway just outside the Australian Capital Territory. Its western border is formed by the Murrumbidgee River and its southern border by Michelago creek. It includes most of Michelago.
