= Pan Is Dead (Still Life) =

1911 painting by George Washington Lambert

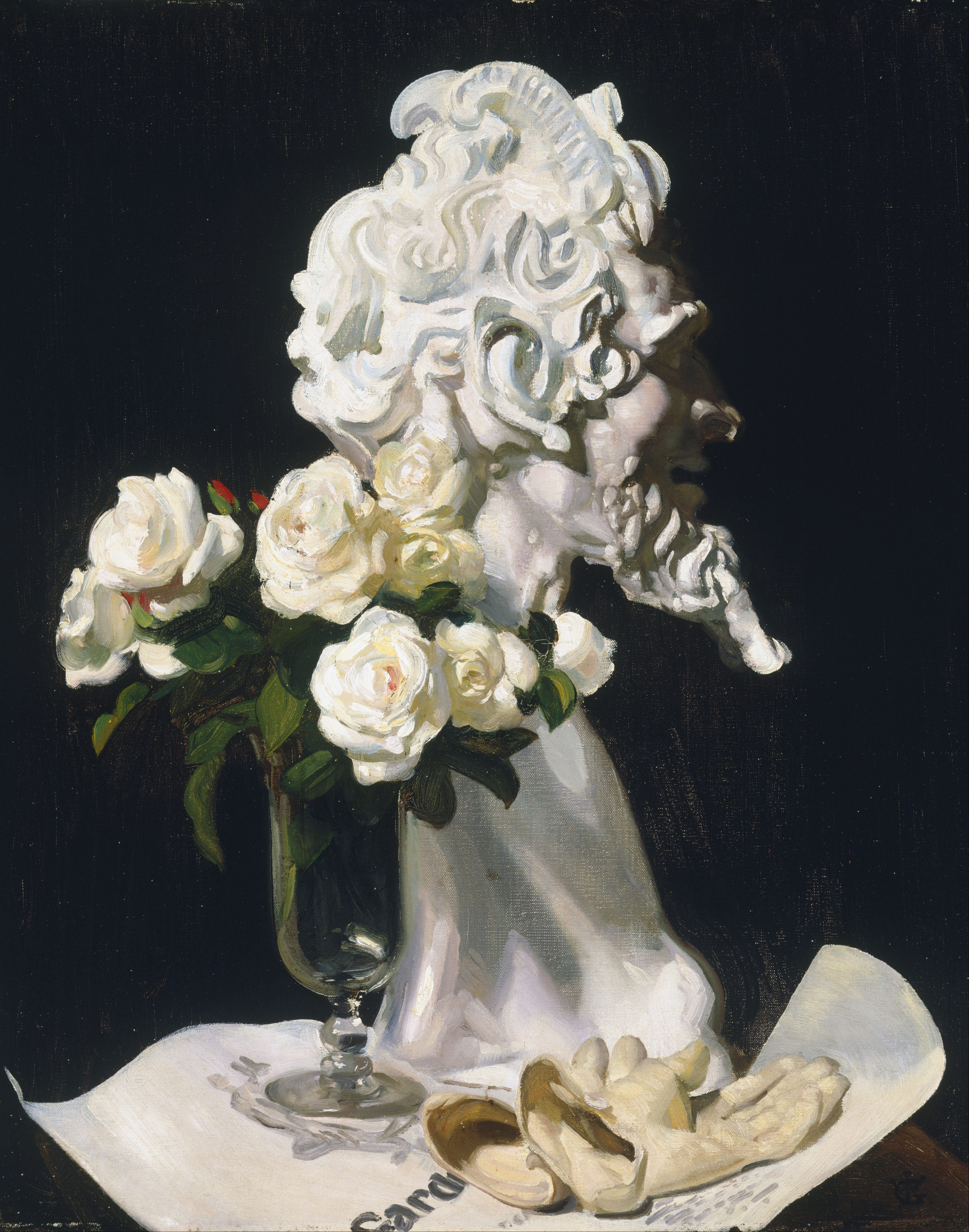
- Artist: George Washington Lambert
- Year: 1911
- Medium: oil on canvas
- Dimensions: 76.5 cm × 63.5 cm (30.1 in × 25.0 in)
- Location: Art Gallery of New South Wales; Sydney
- Website: https://www.artgallery.nsw.gov.au/collection/works/8701/

Pan Is Dead (Still Life) is a 1911 still life painting by Australian artist George Washington Lambert. The painting depicts "a sculpted head of Pan beside white gloves and a glass vase filled with white roses". Lambert created the bust of Pan as part of a costume for a character he played in a tableau vivant, The awakening of Pan, created in 1909 by the wife of the artist Philip Connard.

Lambert constructed a conceit in which he played upon the difference between how things appear on the surface of the canvas and how they are in reality. He abrogated the difference between the solid bust of Pan and the bunch of fragile white roses in the glass vase beside it by making the sculpted curls in Pan's hair resemble roses and by using sharply defined edges to 'sculpt' the flowers.

— Anne Grey

The god Pan is said to be a personification of nature while white roses symbolise "truth, innocence and spirituality". The white gloves were "symbol of good manners in the Edwardian era".

The painting was first exhibited in London in 1911 under the title Pan is dead; the title has been said to suggest "both that Pan has lost his liveliness by being cast into a still sculpture, as well as the possible defeat of Pan by both the innocence of the flowers and the rigid social mores of the Edwardian middle class".

The painting was acquired by the Art Gallery of New South Wales in 1952 and remains part of its collection.
