= The Squatter's Daughter (Lambert) =

Painting by George W. Lambert

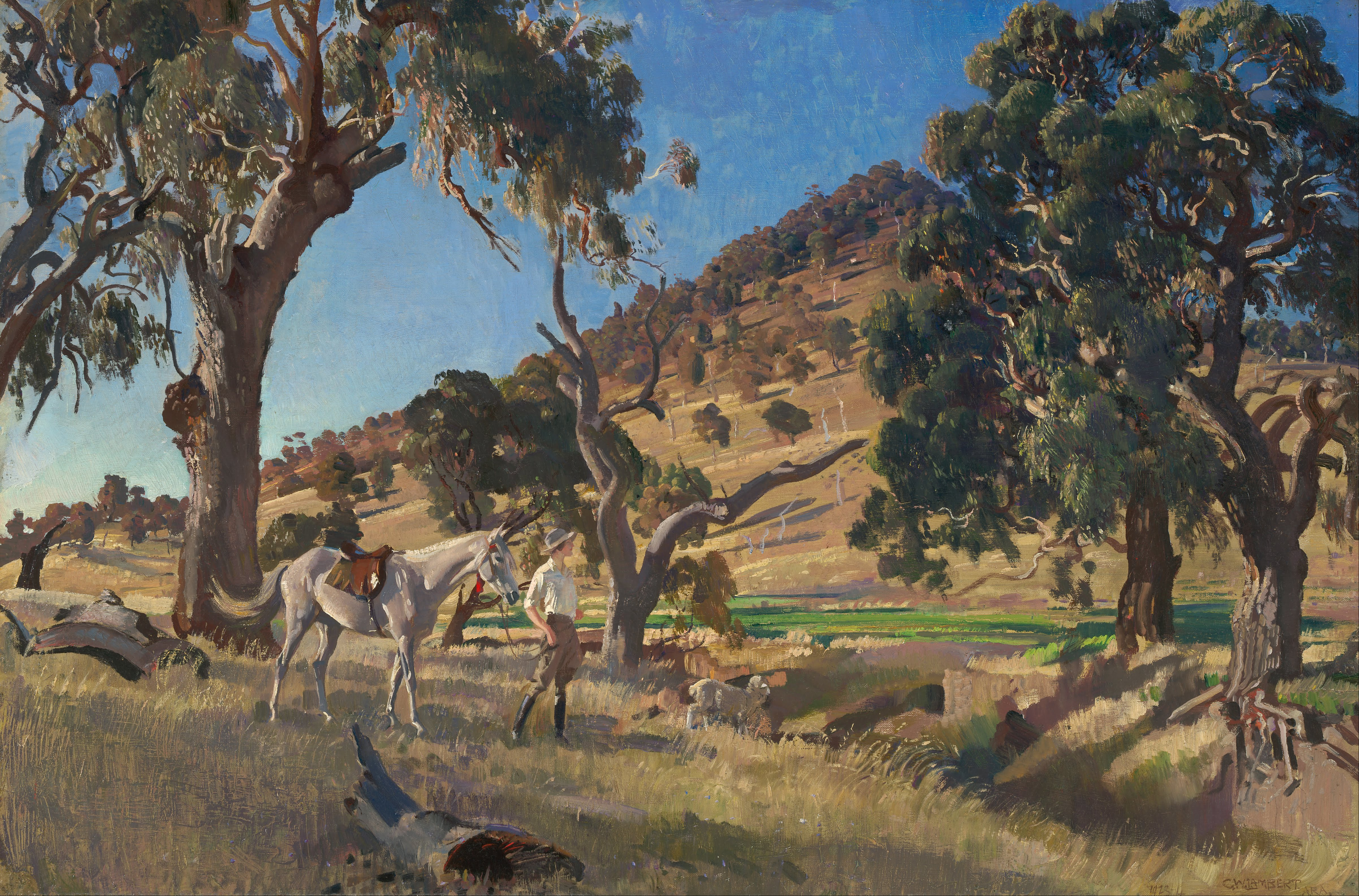
- Artist: George Washington Lambert
- Year: 1924
- Medium: oil on canvas
- Dimensions: 61.4 cm × 90.2 cm (24.2 in × 35.5 in)
- Location: National Gallery of Australia; Canberra
- Website: https://artsearch.nga.gov.au/detail.cfm?irn=155506

The Squatter's Daughter is a 1924 painting by Australian artist George Washington Lambert. It is part of the collection of the National Gallery of Australia in Canberra.

== Subject ==
The painting depicts Gwendoline ‘Dee’ Ryrie, the "squatter's daughter" wearing a white shirt and jodhpurs standing by her horse in her family's farming property at Michelago, in New South Wales, Australia. Lambert had met Ryrie's father Major General Sir Granville Ryrie during World War I in Palestine while working as an official war artist. The horse itself was a gift to Gwendoline from Lambert.

== Composition ==
In this painting Lambert set out to take a more formal approach to the Australian landscape, looking to reduce the landscape to definite forms.

[Lambert] simplified the triangular mass of the hill and sharpened its outline and counterbalanced this with the strong verticals of the trees and the horizontal streak of green grass in the lower centre. Lambert painted with tight controlled brush strokes, so that the image seems still, but lifelike, with the trees and grass delineated by a sharp, scintillating light

— Anne Grey,

Lambert described his portrayal of Ryrie as "like a figure on a Greek vase" passing "gracefully across the foreground".

== Provenance ==
Lambert sold the painting in 1926 to Englishman George Pitt-Rivers. The painting was acquired by the National Gallery of Australia in 1991 with the assistance of James Fairfax and Philip Bacon and the people of Australia.

== Reception ==
When the “Squatter’s Daughter” was first shown, to the best of my knowledge, only three Australian artists proclaimed its originality and truth. Such a break with suave sentiment and surface drawing met with a protective opposition – here was almost an attack upon established income. It was pronounced hard, untrue, unsympathetic. To-day we know this landscape to possess the largest local truth, supreme draughtsmanship and design, and to exhale the very spirit of Australia.

— Lionel Lindsay,

The first exhibition of The Squatter's Daughter "created a stir" with its formalist approach to the Australian landscape. Howard Ashton was critical of the painting claiming that it lacked emotion. Another critic commented: "The Lambert landscape, The Squatter’s Daughter, will be of unique interest … as representing a direct break with the Streeton convention" while Hans Heysen remarked that the painting was "different from anything else painted in Australia" and later that it was "an object lesson for the young landscape painters of Australia".
