= The Convex Mirror =

Painting by George Washington Lambert

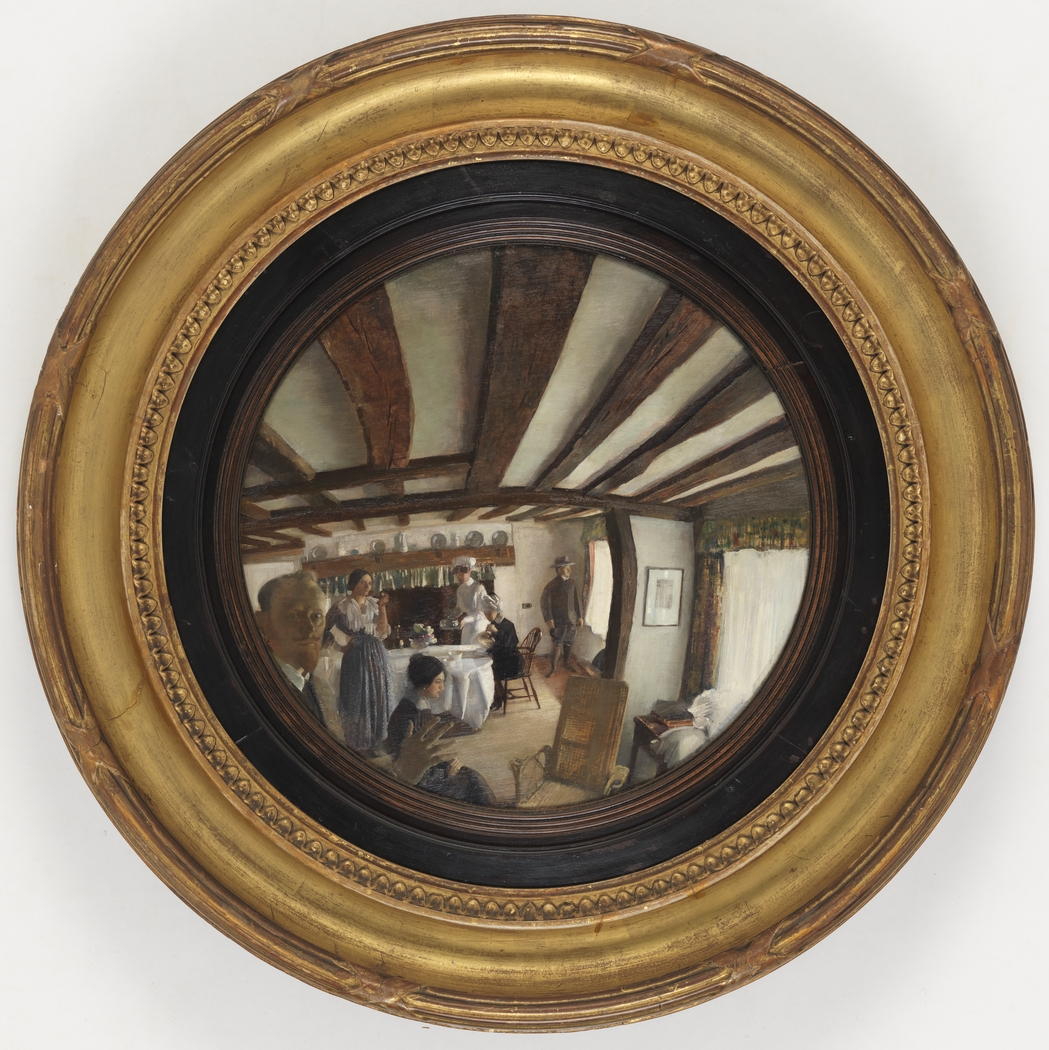
- Artist: George Washington Lambert
- Year: c 1916
- Medium: oil with pencil on wood panel
- Dimensions: 50 cm diameter (20 in)
- Location: State Library of New South Wales; Sydney
- Website: http://digital.sl.nsw.gov.au/delivery/DeliveryManagerServlet?embedded=true&toolbar=false&dps_pid=FL3295754

The Convex Mirror is a c 1916 oil with pencil on wood panel painting by Australian artist George Washington Lambert.

The work depicts the interior of Belwethers, a cottage in Cranleigh, a village in Surrey in southern England.

Lambert was influenced in the creation of this work by the late-Renaissance artist Parmigianino's 1520s painting Self-portrait in a Convex Mirror.

It is a jewel-like piece of painting, with the lustre of a looking-glass, in which Lambert explored the distinction between how things appear in the picture or in a mirror, or how they are in life itself. He placed the artist within the painting on a separate plane from the other people within the scene, and showed him ignoring them and looking out to the viewer – observing the entire scene through a convex mirror. His hand thrusts forward, without a brush, spread wide as it would when distorted in a mirror.

— Anne Grey,

Lambert's friend, artist Thea Proctor said The convex mirror "has the exquisite finish of the Dutch Masters, and shows that a present-day artist could also paint small things in a large manner."

The painting was acquired by the State Library of New South Wales in 2012 as part of a bequest from art collector Helen Selle.
