= Important People (Lambert) =

1914-1921 painting by George Washington Lambert

Important people
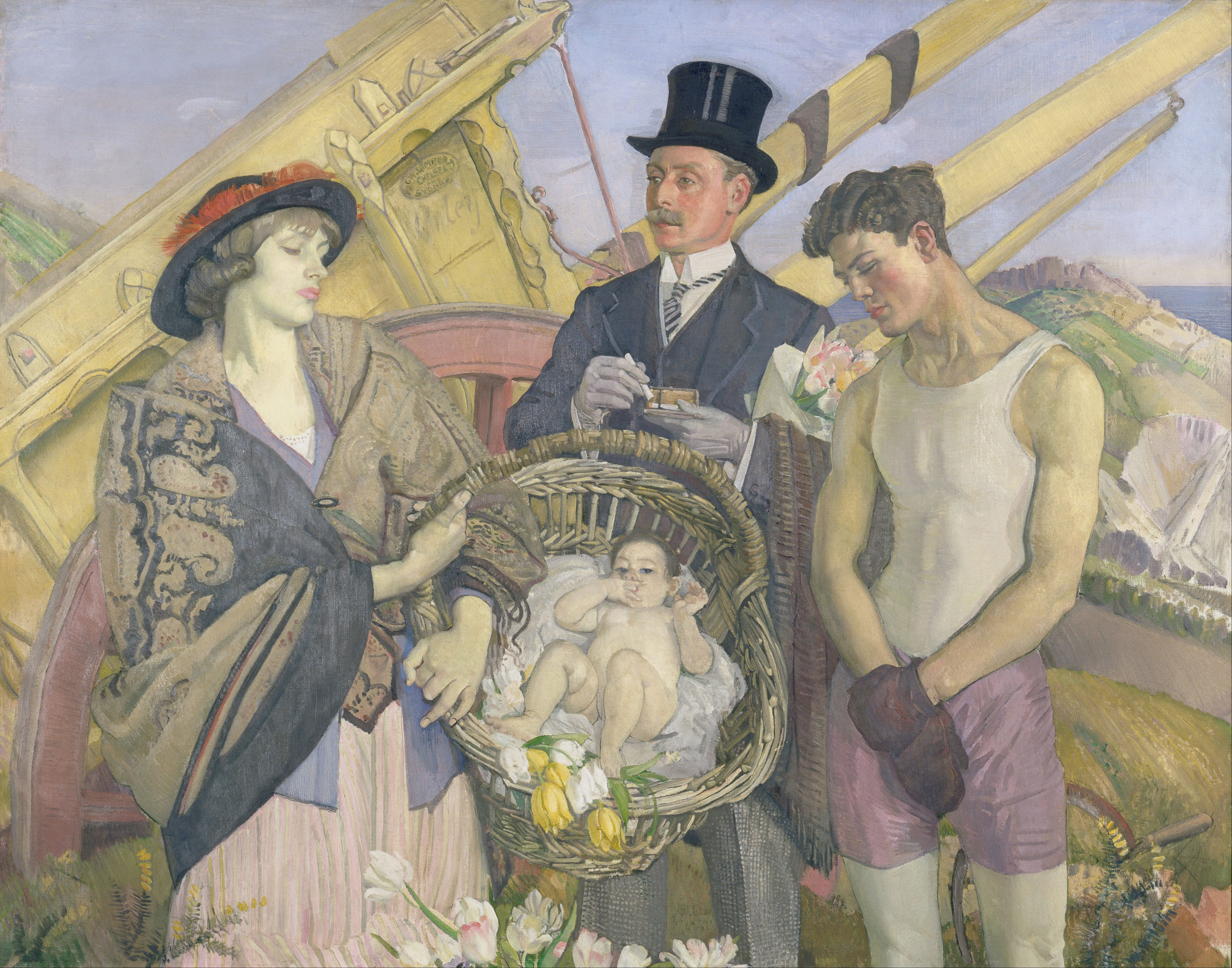
- Artist: George Washington Lambert
- Year: 1914 - 1921
- Medium: oil on canvas
- Dimensions: 134.7 cm × 171 cm (53.0 in × 67 in)
- Location: Art Gallery of New South Wales; Sydney
- Website: artgallery.nsw.gov.au

Important People is an oil on canvas painting by Australian artist George Washington Lambert. First exhibited in 1914 and reworked in 1921, the work depicts a group of four ordinary people in front of a cart by the sea – a flower seller, a boxer, a businessman and a baby.

On initial exhibition in 1914, the eminent critic Paul George Konody stated of the work "One could accept it as a triumphant assertion of the theory that it does not matter what a picture represents, so long as it be well painted".

Lambert reworked the painting on return to Australia in 1921 and exhibited it at the Society of Artists in Sydney in 1921.

In an article in The Herald in 1921 Lambert described the work as "his favourite".

Mr Lambert stated that a slight allegory might be suggested by the composition of his work, as it represented motherhood and the future generations, the fighting forces of the world and the administrative qualities, without which the world (the red cart wheel) would not go round smoothly

— The Herald, 18 March 1921,

After Lambert's death, the work was acquired by the Art Gallery of New South Wales in 1930 and remains part of its collection.
