= Maurice Lambert =

British sculptor

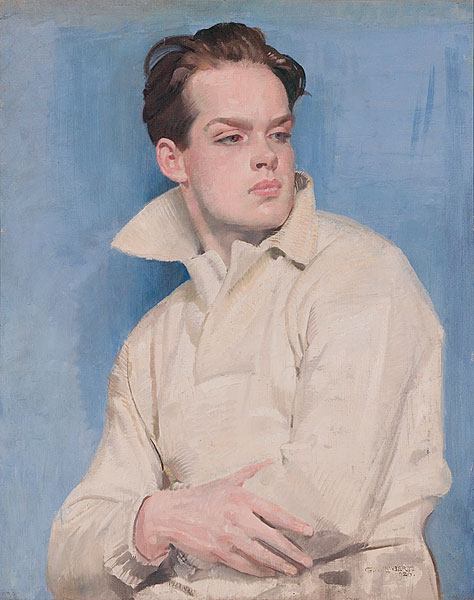
- Maurice Lambert, painted by his father, George W. Lambert in 1920
- Born: 25 June 1901; Paris, France
- Died: 17 August 1964 (aged 63); Guy's Hospital, London
- Education: Chelsea College of Art
- Occupation: Sculptor
- Spouse: Olga Marie Stuart (m. 1926)
- Father: George Washington Lambert
- Relatives: Constant Lambert (brother)

Maurice Prosper Lambert RA (25 June 1901 – 17 August 1964) was a British sculptor. He was the son of the artist George Washington Lambert and the older brother of the composer and author Constant Lambert.

Lambert is mostly known for his public sculptures. He was also a member of the Seven and Five Society and The London Group. Lambert was Professor of Sculpture at the Royal Academy of Arts from 1950 to 1958.

== Early life ==
Maurice Lambert was born in Paris in 1901, the son of Russian-born Australian painter George Washington Lambert and his wife Amelia Beatrice Absell. He was educated at Manor House School in Clapham, London. From 1918 to 1923, Lambert was apprenticed to the sculptor Francis Derwent Wood. During this period, Lambert helped Wood complete the Machine Gun Corps Memorial now located on Hyde Park Corner in London. At this time he also helped in his father's studio as a painting assistant and model. Lambert became Wood's assistant in 1924. He attended Chelsea College of Art from 1920 until 1925.

== Career ==
Lambert's sculptures were first exhibited at Regent Street's Goupil Gallery in the spring of 1925 where he showed mainly bronze portraits. As early as 1926, Lambert began to make sculptures incorporating the motif of birds in flight. He held his first one-man exhibition at the Claridge Gallery in 1927.

Between May and July 1928, the aristocrat and Bright Young Thing Stephen Tennant sat for a bust portrait by Lambert. Tennant, who owned the bust, was reportedly delighted with it, saying: "It is very startling...the fur collar of the coat looks like a huge dead snake, the face has a null, poisonous beauty that I like." His work was also part of the art competitions at the 1928 Summer Olympics and the 1948 Summer Olympics.

Lambert's use of a wide range of materials for sculpture and carving was made evident at the 1929 New Sculpture by Maurice Lambert exhibition at Arthur Tooth and Sons, where he showed sculptures made from marble, alabaster, African hardwood, Portland stone and metal.

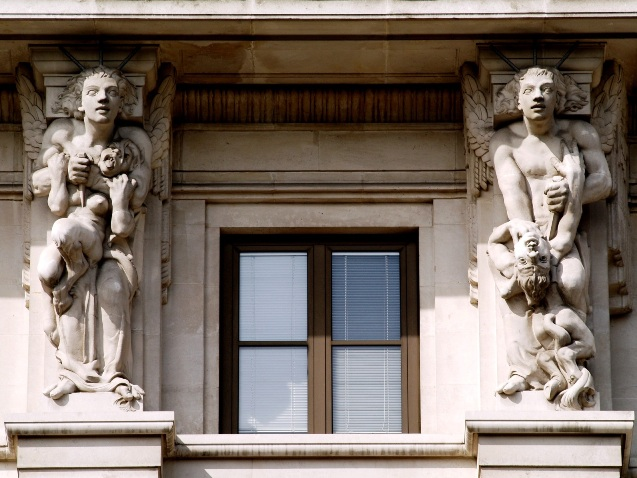
Two of the sculptures Maurice Lambert produced for 33 Grosvenor Place.

Lambert's fourth and final one-man show in his lifetime was at Alex Reid & Lefevre in 1934.

In 1938 Lambert exhibited his portrait of the lutenist, Diana Poulton at the Royal Academy. Cast while Lambert still considered the bust unfinished, this piece is indicative of a looser handling of form as opposed to mimetic representation. Lambert later described this as one of his most successful works.

In 1952 Lambert produced a sculpture for the entrance to the Time & Life Building at 1 Bruton Street, London. He was elected an RA in the same year.

From 1950 to 1958, Lambert was Professor of Sculpture at the Royal Academy of Arts.

In 1956 Lambert exhibited a portrait of the ballerina, Dame Margot Fonteyn at the Royal Academy. For this bronze cast at least, Lambert used the same foundry as the sculptor Henry Moore, the Corinthian Bronze Foundry. In a letter from Moore to Michael Ayrton the following year, Moore commented Lambert's sculpture looked 'awful' from photographs but that he never saw it in person – though he notes that the casting must have been 'alright'. The figure was purchased by the academy under the terms of the Chantrey Bequest. At the time, works purchased as part of the Bequest could be accepted by the Tate Gallery and included in their collection. However, the gallery refused Lambert's bronze of Fonteyn and it was instead loaned by the academy to the Royal Ballet School.

Lambert contributed six grotesque sculptures and two pinnacles to the headquarters of Associated Electrical Industries at 33 Grosvenor Place. The sculptures on the facade of the building depict angelic male figures wrestling with female demons. The spires are made up of stylised dragons coiled around armillary spheres.

== Personal life ==
On 27 July 1926 Lambert married Olga Marie Stuart.

== Death ==
Lambert died of cancer of the colon on 17 August 1964 at Guy's Hospital, London.
