= Baby 700 Commonwealth War Graves Commission Cemetery =

Gallipoli Peninsula WWI cemetery

Baby 700
- Commonwealth War Graves Commission
- Used for those deceased April–December 1915
- Established: 1919
- Location: 40°14′34″N 26°17′40″E near Gallipoli, Turkey
- Total burials: 493
- Unknowns: 449

Burials by nation
- Allied Powers: Australian: 33; New Zealand: 10; British: 1

Burials by war
- World War I: 493

Baby 700 Cemetery is a World War I Commonwealth War Graves Commission cemetery on the Gallipoli Peninsula in Turkey. It contains the bodies of some of the soldiers killed during the battles at Gallipoli. During an eight-month campaign in 1915, Commonwealth and French forces sought to force Turkey out of the war, which would relieve the deadlock on the Western Front and open a supply route to Russia through the Dardanelles and the Black Sea.

== Nomenclature ==
The name Baby 700 originated in cartographic notes on Allied maps. One of the hills in the Sari Bair range was shown as being 700 feet above sea level, and its summit was marked with a small circle. Maps showed another 700 foot hill immediately north of it, marked with a larger circle. These notations led to the names Baby 700 and Big 700 being assigned to them by the Commonwealth forces. Baby 700 retained its name throughout the campaign. Big 700 was later renamed Battleship Hill.

== Action ==
The 3rd Australian Brigade landed at Anzac Cove on 25 April 1915 and successfully reached the summit on the morning of the landing. It was driven off the summit in a Turkish counterattack in the afternoon. Allied forces made several attempts to recapture it over the following months, with major assaults on 2 May and 7 August but it remained in Turkish control for the rest of the campaign.

== Cemetery construction ==
The cemetery was constructed in 1919, and the remains recovered from the surrounding area here buried there. Special memorials commemorate ten Australian soldiers thought to be amongst its 449 unidentified burials.

== See also ==
- Gallipoli campaign
- Australian and New Zealand Army Corps
