= Mrs Annie Murdoch =

1927 painting by George Washington Lambert

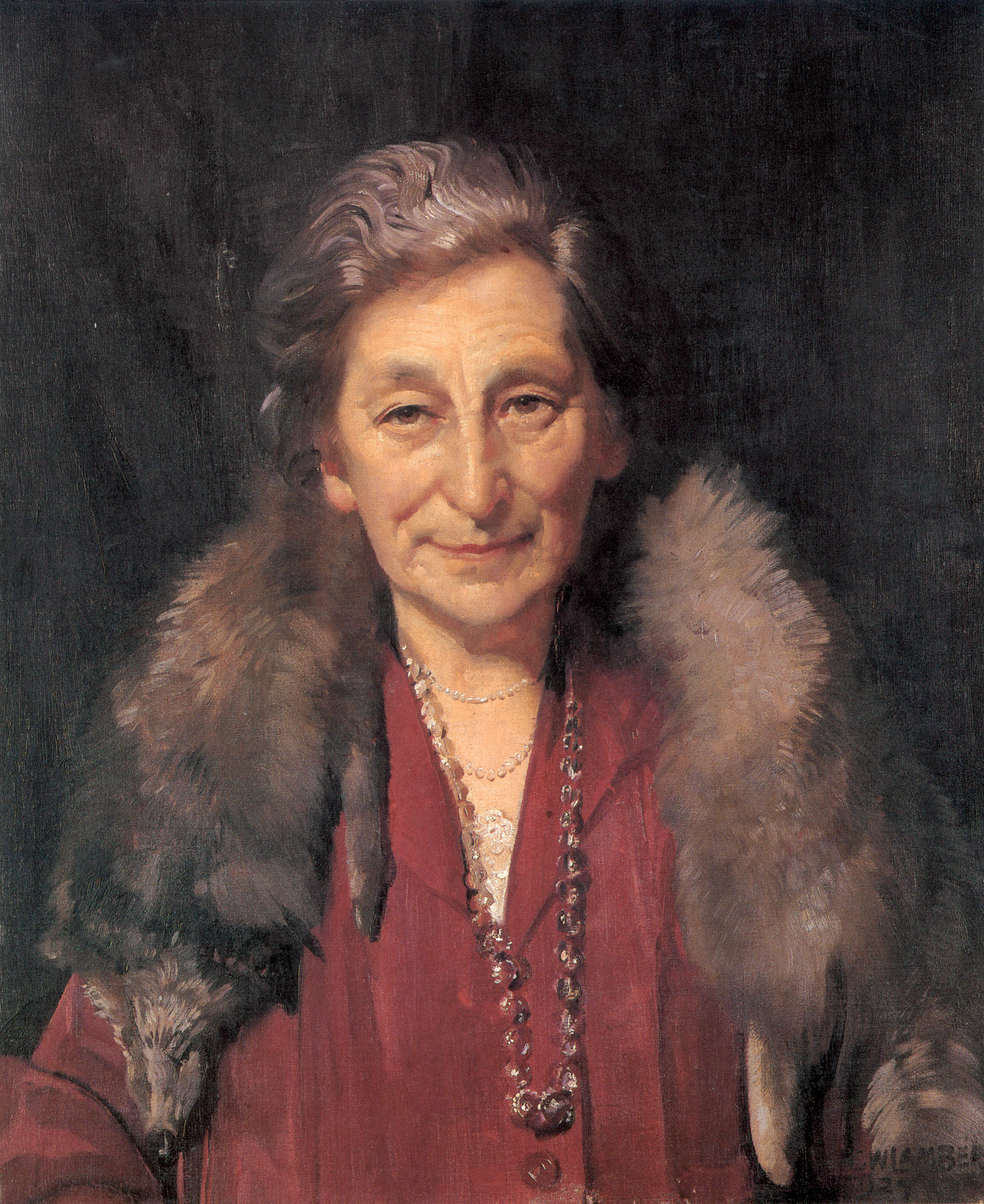
- Artist: George Washington Lambert
- Year: 1927
- Medium: oil on canvas
- Dimensions: 59.6 cm × 49.5 cm (23.5 in × 19.5 in)
- Location: Private collection

Mrs Annie Murdoch is a 1927 portrait painting by Australian artist George Washington Lambert. The painting depicts Annie Murdoch, the mother of newspaper proprietor Keith Murdoch and grandmother of businessman Rupert Murdoch. Murdoch commissioned this painting of his mother, who migrated to Australia from Scotland in 1884 with her Presbyterian minister husband, Patrick. Lambert painted the work in September 1927.

It is a striking portrait and full of character. Lambert portrayed the alert-faced matron, with her brown eyes looking directly out of the picture with confidence and authority. He showed her smiling with what might be interpreted as genial amusement

— National Gallery of Australia,

The painting was awarded the Archibald Prize in 1927. The painting remains part of the Murdoch family collection.
