= Chesham Street =

Painting by George Lambert

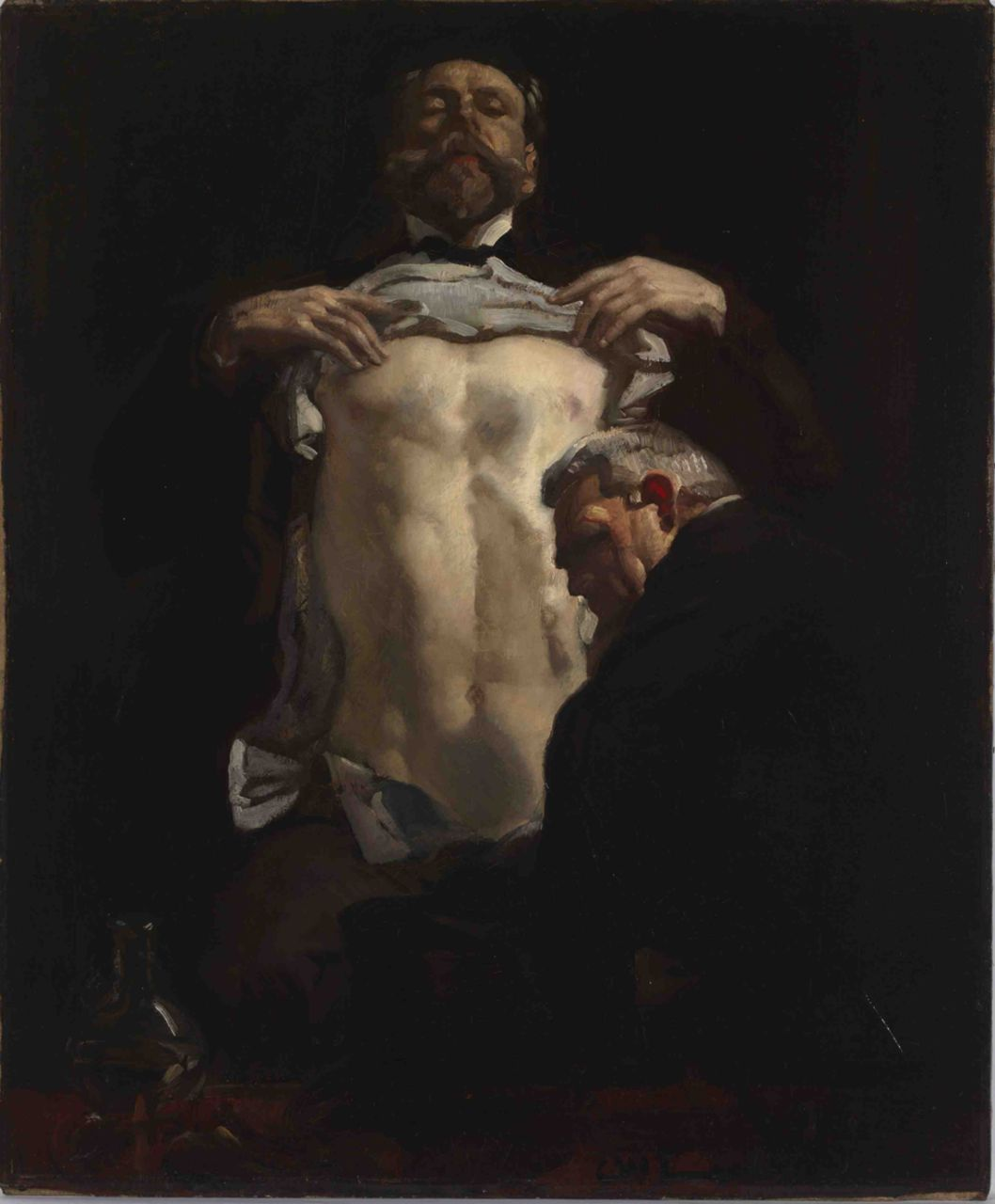
- Artist: George Washington Lambert
- Year: 1910
- Medium: oil on canvas
- Dimensions: 62 cm × 51.5 cm (24 in × 20.3 in)
- Location: National Gallery of Australia; Canberra
- Website: https://searchthecollection.nga.gov.au/object?uniqueId=99346

Chesham Street is a 1910 oil-on-canvas painting by Australian artist George Washington Lambert. The work depicts a doctor performing an auscultation on a man with his shirt lifted and torso exposed. The work was painted at the Rossetti Studios on Flood Street in London. The painting is one of a set of "puzzle pictures" painted by Lambert between 1910 and 1914. These paintings are said to "appear to have a meaning and yet are not strictly narrative; they invite the viewer to provide their own interpretation.".

The man sits boldly in front of the viewer, holding up his shirt and revealing his entire torso. His head is held high, his lips are closed and he looks down at the viewer, seeming somewhat superior. His pale flesh, with the play of light on it, gleams against the dark surroundings.

— Anne Grey,

William Hardy Wilson and Thea Proctor, friends of Lambert's, identified the model as "Williams", an ex-sailor who modelled for Lambert in other works such as The Shop (1909). However the features of the patient's features resemble Lambert's own.

The work has been identified as "a unique example from the Edwardian period of a depiction of a medical examination of an upper-class male patient". The work recalls earlier works showing auscultations such as Abel Faivre's The Examination (1898) and Albert Guillaume's The Doctor (1903). The work suggests Lambert may have been influenced in its representation of the male body by François Sallé's The Anatomy Class at the Ecole des Beaux Arts (1888), part of the Art Gallery of New South Wales collection when Lambert was living in Sydney.

While the picture can be read as a narrative scene showing a doctor examining a patient, Anne Grey—the Head of Australian Art at the National Gallery of Australia—claims rather that it "is a metaphor: this man seems to have nothing to hide, to be literally and metaphorically baring his bosom, exposing his heart and soul to the world". Keren Rosa Hammerschlag, a lecturer in Art History at the Australian National University interprets Chesham Street as a patient self-portrait, which reveals the artist's dual personalities of bohemian artist and Australian boxer: two personae that did not combine seamlessly" and that the work "conjoined the head and hands of the bohemian artist with the muscular torso of a sportsman."

I locate in the figure of the patient signifiers of the complex and sometimes conflicted identity of Lambert as an Australian expatriate artist living and working in London in the early twentieth century. In the patient's dinner suit, manicured moustache and pompous expression I identify Lambert the gentleman-bohemian artist; in the deliberate placement of his hands I locate Lambert the skilled craftsman; and in the muscular torso I find Lambert the working-class Australian sportsman.

— Keren Rosa Hammerschlag,

The work was first exhibited at the New English Art Club in London 1910. Contemporary opinion was mixed. A critic for The Times wrote that the painting passed beyond "the bounds of permissible ugliness" noting that "[w]hen Rembrandt twice painted a dissecting-room he had a real subject; but an auscultation such as Mr Lambert has painted is nothing but an ugly incident". The Observer critic noted that the work "represents an auscultation scene, which is made the excessively unpleasant excuse for the truly masterful painting of a male torso" while The Athenaeum critic wrote that it "must be praised for the mordant humour with which a pompous gentleman is depicted keeping up his dignity in difficult circumstances".

When later displayed in Australia, Lamberts friends noted that "the subject provided a splendid opportunity for the presentation of nudity" although the painting is not strictly a nude. Recent critics have described the painting as a "bravura work in which [Lambert] displayed his considerable ability in depicting naked flesh". The painting was acquired by the National Gallery of Australia in 1993. The work remains part of its collection.
