= Rae (surname) =

Rae is a surname and given name.

Notable people with the surname include:

== People (surname) ==
- Alex Rae (disambiguation)

- Alex Rae (American soccer), American player (Newark Germans, Kearny Scots, United States)
- Alex Rae (footballer, born 1946), Scottish player (East Fife, Partick Thistle, Forfar)
- Alex Rae (footballer, born 1969), Scottish player and manager
- Alex Rae (rugby union) (born 1986), played for (Northampton, Bedford)

- Allen Rae (1932–2016), Canadian basketball referee
- Ann Cuthbert Rae (1788–1860), Scottish-born Canadian writer and educator
- Ashly Rae, Scottish actress, model and TV presenter
- Bob Rae (born 1948), Canadian politician
- Cath Rae (born 1985), Scottish field hockey goalkeeper
- Charlotte Rae, American actress and singer
- Corinne Bailey Rae (born 1979), British songwriter and singer
- Dawn Rae (born 1941), Australian cricketer
- Divini Rae, motivational speaker, fitness personality and entrepreneur
- Douglas Rae (businessman) (1931–2018), Scottish businessman
- Douglas Rae (film and TV executive) (born 1947), Scottish television executive and former presenter
- Douglas W. Rae (born 1939), political scientist
- Eleanor Rae (born 1934), American author and eco-feminist
- Frederick James Rae (1883–1941), Australian botanist
- Gavin Rae (born 1977), Scottish footballer
- Gwynedd Rae (1892–1977), British children's author
- Ian Rae (1933–2005), Scottish footballer
- Issa Rae (born 1985), American actress
- Iso Rae (1860–1940), Australian impressionist painter
- Jack Rae (1919–2007), New Zealand flying ace of the Second World War
- Jackie Rae (1922–2006), Canadian singer and songwriter
- Jasmine Rae (born 1987), Australian singer and songwriter
- Jason Rae (born 1986), American political activist
- Jesse Rae (born 1951), Scottish singer-songwriter
- John Rae (administrator) (1813–1900), Australian administrator, painter and author
- John Rae (biographer) (1845–1915), Scottish journalist and biographer of Adam Smith
- John Rae (economist) (1796–1872), Scottish economist and author
- John Rae (educator) (1931–2006), English novelist, journalist and headmaster
- John Rae (explorer) (1813–1893), Scottish explorer of the Arctic
- John B. Rae (1838–1922), American labour leader in 1890s
- Johnny Rae (motorsport) American auto racing mechanic and constructor
- Lou Rae, Australian author and historian
- Nelson Rae (1915–1945), American radio and stage actor
- Robin Rae (born 1964), Scottish footballer
- Stephen Rae (footballer) (born 1952), Australian Rules footballer
- Stephen Rae (composer) (born 1961), Australian composer
- Stephen Rae (editor) (born 1960s), Irish news editor
- Thomas Rae (1819–1862), Australian manufacturer and politician
- Thomas G. Rae (1886–1957), Scottish-South African military pilot
- Tony Rae (1927–2000), Australian educator
- Zac Rae, American musician
