= Eben Gowrie Waterhouse =

Australian teacher, scholar, and plant breeder

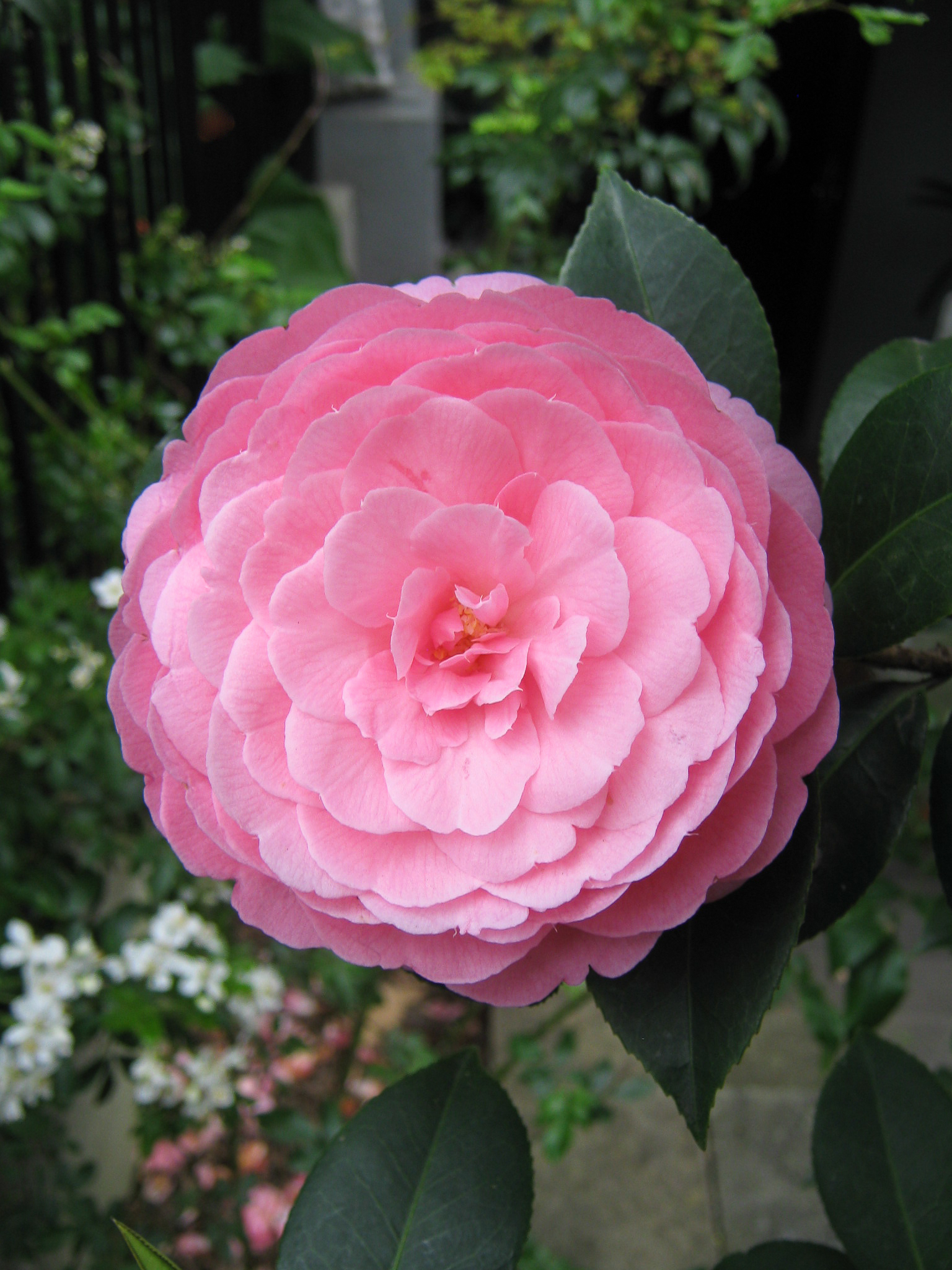
Camellia 'E. G. Waterhouse' raised by Waterhouse in 1946 at Gordon, NSW and named after himself.

Eben Gowrie Waterhouse OBE CMG (1881–1977) was an Australian who had three distinguished careers. Starting out as an innovative teacher of languages, he became one of Australia's most prominent Germanists when classical German culture still commanded worldwide respect. Between the Wars in Sydney he was a leading arbiter of taste in house-and-garden living, fostering a conception of garden design which still dominates much of the Sydney North Shore and parts of Melbourne. Finally, in his long retirement he brought about, as scholar and plant-breeder, an international revival of interest in the genus Camellia.

== Early life ==
Eben Gowrie Waterhouse (Gowrie to his intimates) was born in Waverley, Sydney on 29 April 1881. He was the second of the three boys of Gustavus John Waterhouse and his wife Mary Jane Vickery, both native-born. His two grandfathers were English, one grandmother Scottish, one German. To his German grandmother he attributed his lifelong love of the German language. His older brother, Gustavus Athol (known as Athol; 1877–1950) became a noted entomologist and published the first comprehensive catalogue of Australian butterflies. His younger brother, Leslie Vickery (Les) Waterhouse (1886–1945) was an influential mining engineer. Gowrie came to love plants, especially native plants, as a young bushwalker.

With his brothers, Waterhouse was educated at Sydney Grammar School and the University of Sydney (B.A. with first class honours in French, German and Italian 1900–1903; MacCallum Prize for English 1901; M.A. 1919).

== Languages and cultures ==
After four years teaching at the King's School Parramatta, and two years studying languages and phonetics at Leipzig, Waterhouse returned as master of foreign languages at Sydney Grammar with his "direct method" of teaching foreign languages. The method was to begin using the language in conversation getting the sounds right; underlying grammatical structure came later. It was so successful he was quickly taken on to the faculty of the Sydney Teachers' Training College, where his pupils disseminated the method in New South Wales schools. He became associate professor of German at the University of Sydney in 1926; professor of German and Comparative Literature from 1938 to 1946. He was also prominent from the 1920s in the Goethe Society, the Alliance Française and the Dante Alighieri Art and Literary Society. Waterhouse relinquished his university chair in 1946, but remained honorary curator of the university grounds till 1949.

Waterhouse thought each person strove to find and express his individual genius, and that the highest form of its expression was to be found in literature and art. To him, the great exponent and exemplar of such genius was the German poet Goethe. When Waterhouse describes his own landscaping and gardening as an art, the implication is that the expression of Waterhouse's individual genius is to be found in his gardens. The peak of his career as a Germanist came in 1932 when he delivered the address in the Great Hall of the University of Sydney on the centenary of Goethe's death.

In the 1930s he supported the League of Nations inside and outside the university. He proposed a Club of International Culture be established in Sydney to break down misunderstanding between cultures and to encourage a richer cultural development in Australia itself. In this he was like his English friend and fellow camellia enthusiast Sir Henry Price, co-founder of the Royal Institute of International Affairs at that time for parallel reasons. Travelling in Europe shortly after the Night of the Long Knives, Waterhouse had the prestige, standing and fluency to gain interviews with Hitler and Mussolini. His views were widely reported: he found Hitler face to face idealistic, fanatical, dramatic but unsound; Mussolini more statesman-like. Goebbels he thought dangerous and cunning. He preferred to live in "our free and sane Australia."

In his eighties Waterhouse taught himself Japanese in order to be able to "talk camellias" with Japanese experts.

== Marriage ==
On 1 October 1912 Waterhouse married Janet Frew Kellie, a Scotswoman he had met studying languages in Paris in 1907. They returned to Sydney and eventually had four sons. Gordon Gowrie Waterhouse (1913–1986) was a horticulturalist who, with his father, established Camellia Grove Nursery in St Ives in 1939. Douglas Frew Waterhouse (1916–2000) became noted as a biologist at the CSIRO. Evan Wilson Waterhouse (1919–1970) founded Bellbird Books. Ian Kellie Waterhouse (1921–2013) was Foundation Professor of Psychology at Macquarie University.

== Eryldene ==
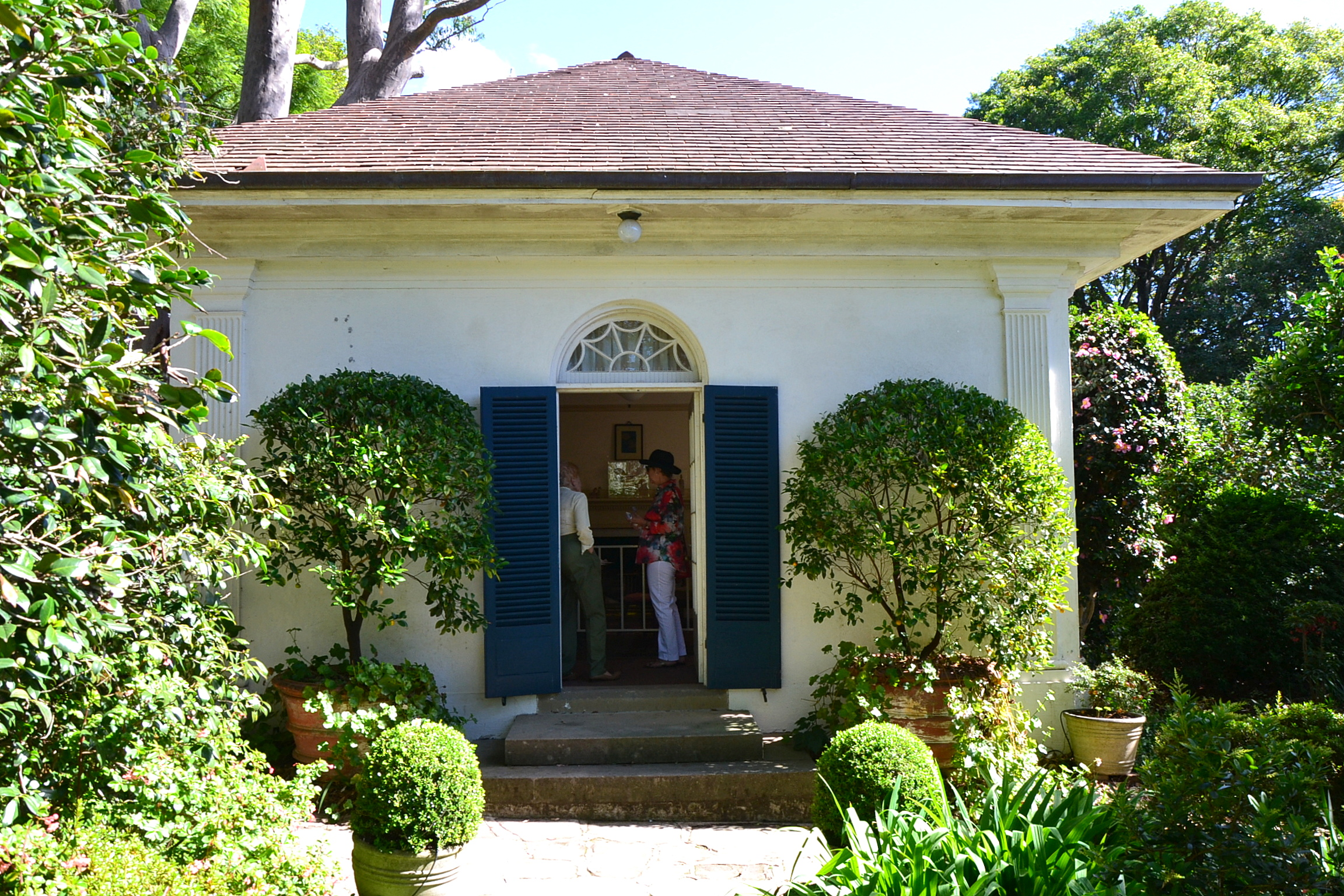
Garden studio at Eryldene (camellias at right)

Between 1913 and 1936 Waterhouse had built on half an acre (0.2 hectares) of land at 17 McIntosh Street, Gordon a house and garden called Eryldene after his wife's birthplace in Scotland. The Waterhouses with their son Gordon moved into the house in 1914. The garden eventually doubled in size; in 1921 it incorporated the block facing the street behind. The house, the open-air "rooms" of the garden and most of the garden buildings were designed and built by William Hardy Wilson in a Georgian Colonial Revival style modelled on early buildings in Sydney and Hobart, but also on Indian bungalows of the same period. House and garden were seen as a unit in the Arts and Crafts manner, though the house is not an Arts and Crafts house and the garden is more symmetrical and formal than the "sinuous gravel paths, squiggly beds, standard roses and general fussiness" of the neighbouring Arts and Crafts gardens. Extending the axes of the house, the formal garden rooms were set against a background of existing eucalypts in the manner of Hardy Wilson's other house designs. These formal spaces were furnished with Waterhouse's semi-formal planting. Waterhouse illustrated this in an article in The Home in 1923. Eryldene became "a touchstone for the Sydney gardens of the first half of the twentieth century."

Waterhouse felt that shrubs, camellias especially, lent "great personality" to a garden in a way which had been neglected in Australia. Eventually his garden came to contain over 700 camellia varieties – the largest private collection in Sydney – completely altering its original character. At a time of enormous expansion of gardens and housing on the North Shore, Eryldene and its plantings were imitated all over Sydney (and in many issues of The Home, until the magazine's attention was drawn in the Thirties to Spanish cloisters and Modernist sundecks). Nearly a century later, the suburbs of Gordon, Killara, Pymble and Turramurra between May and August present an exceptional display of camellias in every form. The Melbourne suburbs of Ivanhoe and Heidelberg show something similar.

Eryldene became a lively centre between the Wars for leaders of opinion and taste, especially those connected to Sydney Ure Smith's The Home: Ure Smith himself, Hardy Wilson, Alfred and Jocelyn Brown, Adrian Feint, Paul Jones, Harold Cazneaux, John Moore and Leslie Wilkinson. Waterhouse was a friend of artists Lionel Lindsay, George Lambert and Thea Proctor. His circle of friends also included the State Governor, Lord Gowrie and Lady Gowrie. Another group were University linguists, most importantly Christopher Brennan, whom Waterhouse regarded as a great poet.

== Landscape and garden ==
Waterhouse participated fully in the 1920s and 1930s expansion of gardening as an art form and way of life. His view always and everywhere combines a scholarly internationalism with unflinching aestheticism. In The Home in 1926 he published "Gardening as an Interpretative Art", illustrated with photos of his own garden by Cazneaux. His argument was elaborated and refined in "Domestic Gardening as an Art" in 1943. Annual and perennial flowers were not enough to sustain the garden as a work of art. Texture and form, not colour alone, were stable enough to support the symphonic repetition and variation of garden elements. Garden rooms formed by walls and hedges should be provided with the "furniture" of pots and geometrical shrubs – juniper, hydrangea and camellia. Larger pieces of "furniture" were provided by classical or oriental temples at the end of sandstone paths. The "floor covering" of the garden room was a well made lawn. Its role in structuring garden space should not be confused by island beds but emphasised by well-planted borders. Form, however, was not everything: he called for advice on how to attract the right-coloured butterflies to each garden room.

Roses, the definitive plant of the Arts and Crafts garden, were severely devalued as "too scraggy" for a Waterhouse design. By 1943 the only rose bush he recommends for Sydney is 'Cramoisi Supérieur' for its combination of bright colour and firmly rounded form. The Lombardy poplar, on the other hand, had everything Waterhouse admired in shape, texture, colour and sound. Starting at Eryldene, many of his landscape designs were marked by formal rows of poplars – often closely planted as a screen. Such rows became ubiquitous in temperate Australia in his lifetime and have almost completely disappeared since.

He imagined in 1931 an enormous landscaped garden of 300 or 400 acres in which colour-forms would take the place of tonal groups in music. The garden was to be, not just an earthly paradise, but a Gesamtkunstwerk on greater-than-Wagnerian scale. The Sydney Harbour Bridge (opened in 1932) should be landscaped. To encourage such works of garden art, he wanted the University of Sydney to found a chair of landscape and domestic gardening.

He looked forward to the day when this school of landscape architecture would be established, where people could go for inspiration and for effective training in the work that was now being done by amateurs. It was a dream of the future, but he hoped that it would be realised.

In this and other ways he was instrumental in founding the profession of landscape architecture in Australia.

Overemphasis on cottage gardens had detracted from the "dignity and personality" of trees, especially Australian native trees, in the landscape. In a scheme for the McMaster Building at Sydney University, he specified a row of poplars to stand opposite the façade, matching its height and width, closed off at one end by five Coral trees with flowers to match the bricks. Waterhouse was also responsible for planting what became the well-loved and iconic Jacaranda tree in the University of Sydney Quadrangle.

With the encouragement of the Vice-Chancellor, Waterhouse redesigned and replanted the grounds of the University of Sydney 1925–1949. He redesigned the garden around the Royal Prince Alfred Hospital and made designs for the University of New England. When the State Governor moved to Canberra as Governor-General of Australia, Waterhouse spent many hours at Yarralumla discussing the landscaping with Lady Gowrie. Sixteen years later he dedicated a camellia to her, one of his "eight or nine really good varieties".

His last book (with Norman Sparnon) was published when he was 87. It explores the use of camellias in ikebana, on which his wife Janet was an acknowledged expert.

== Camellias ==
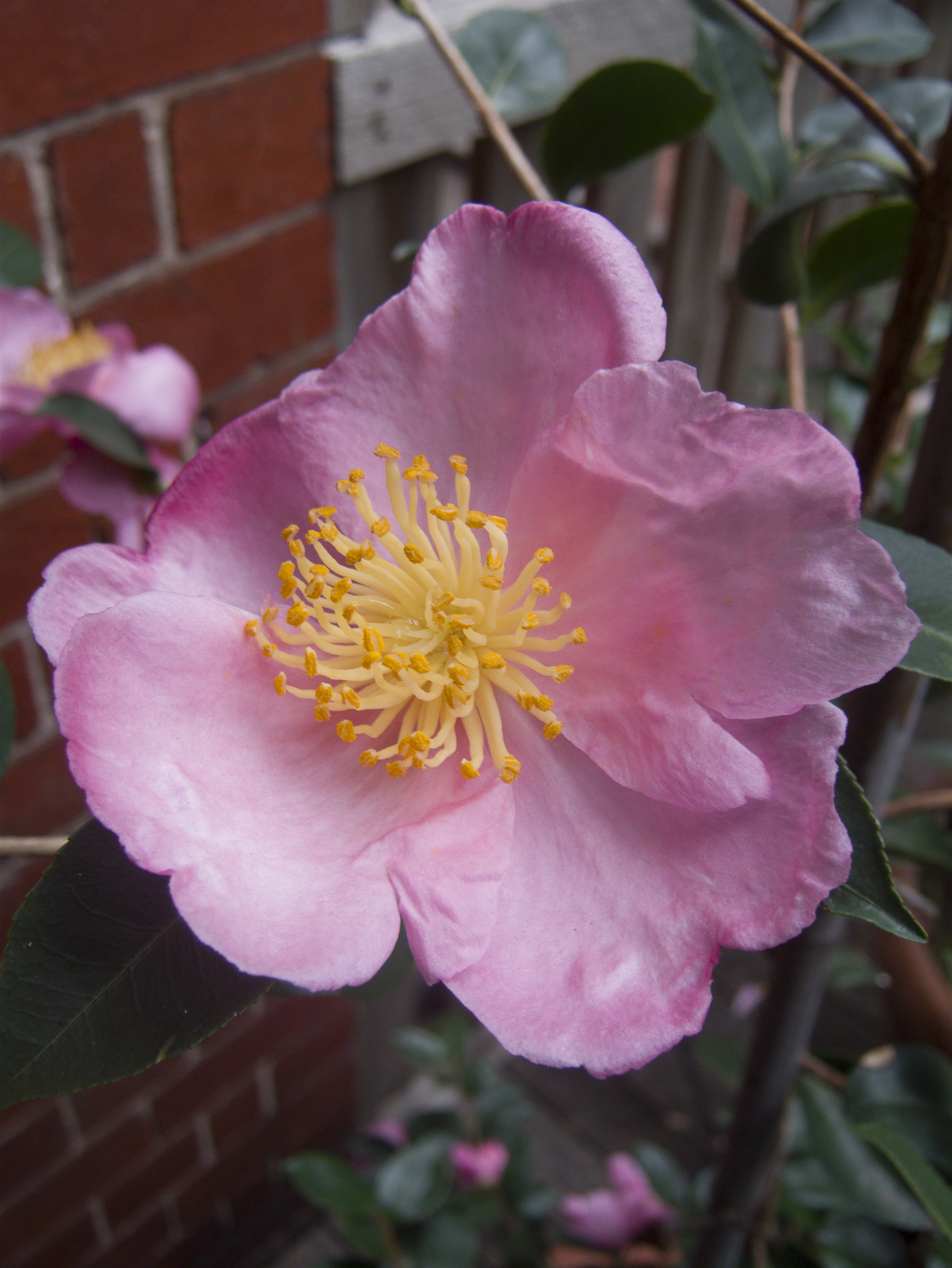
Camellia sasanqua 'Plantation Pink', Waterhouse 1942

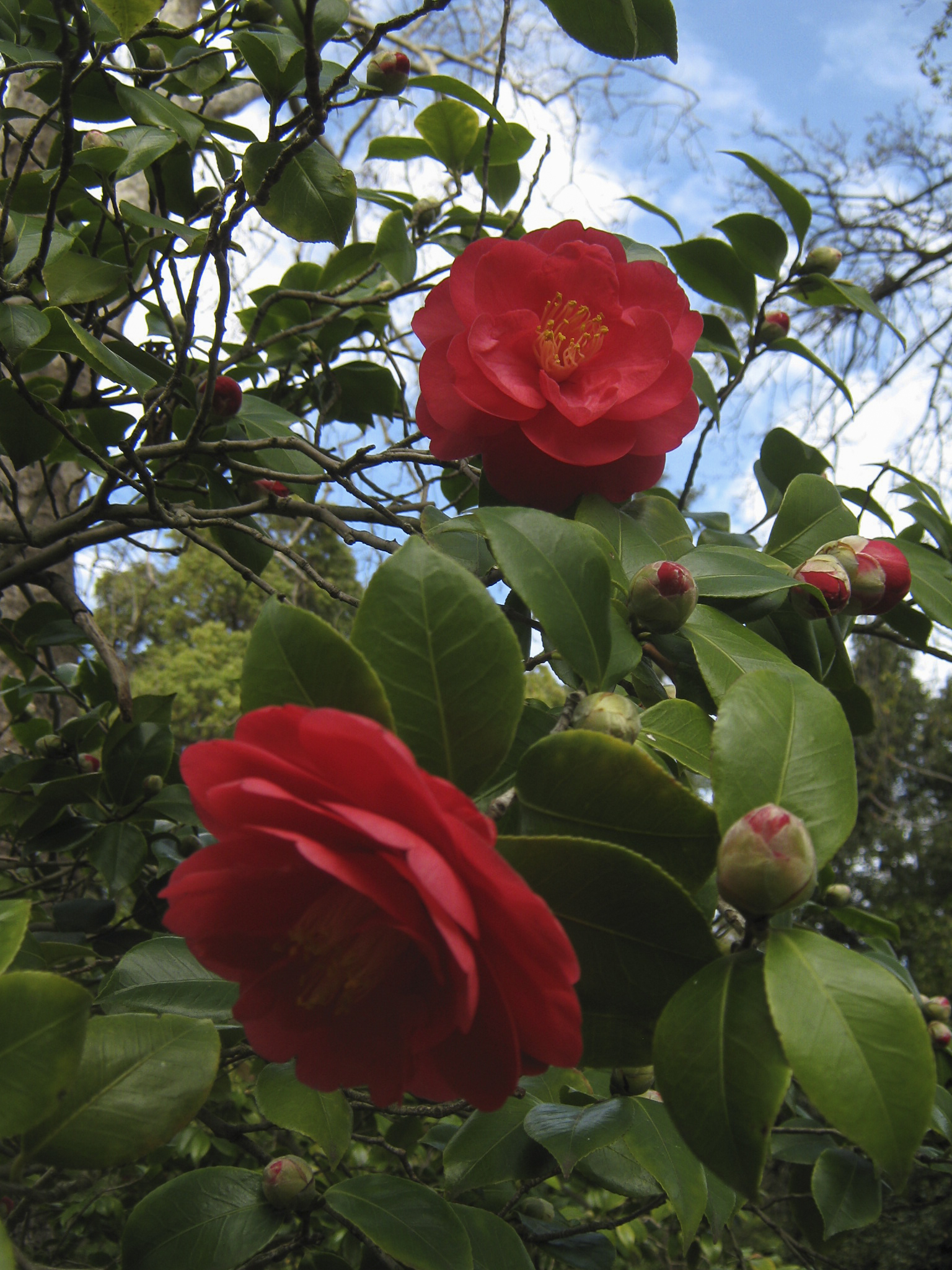
Camellia japonica 'Somersby', Waterhouse 1944

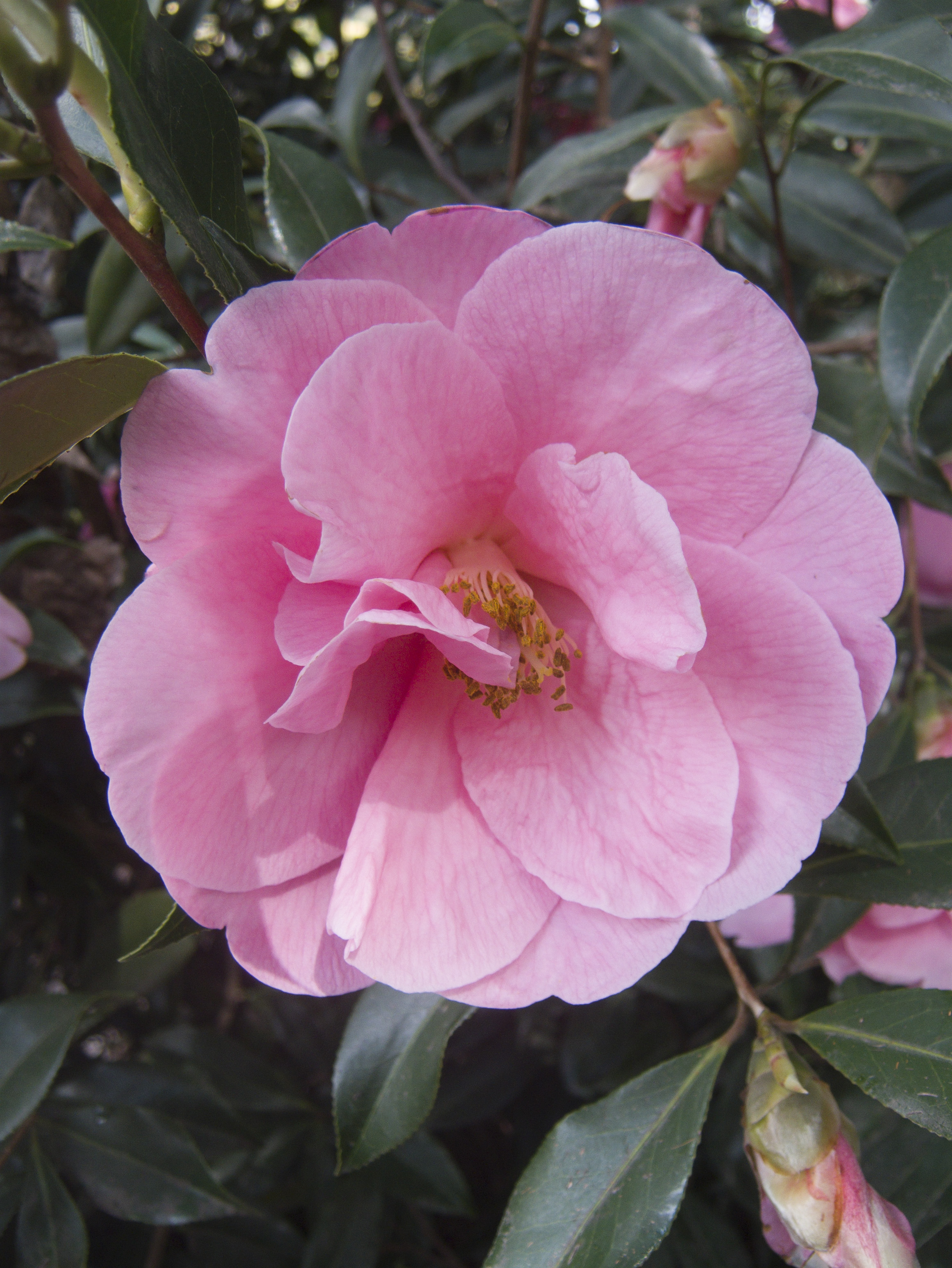
Camellia x williamsii 'Sayonara', E. G. Waterhouse 1946

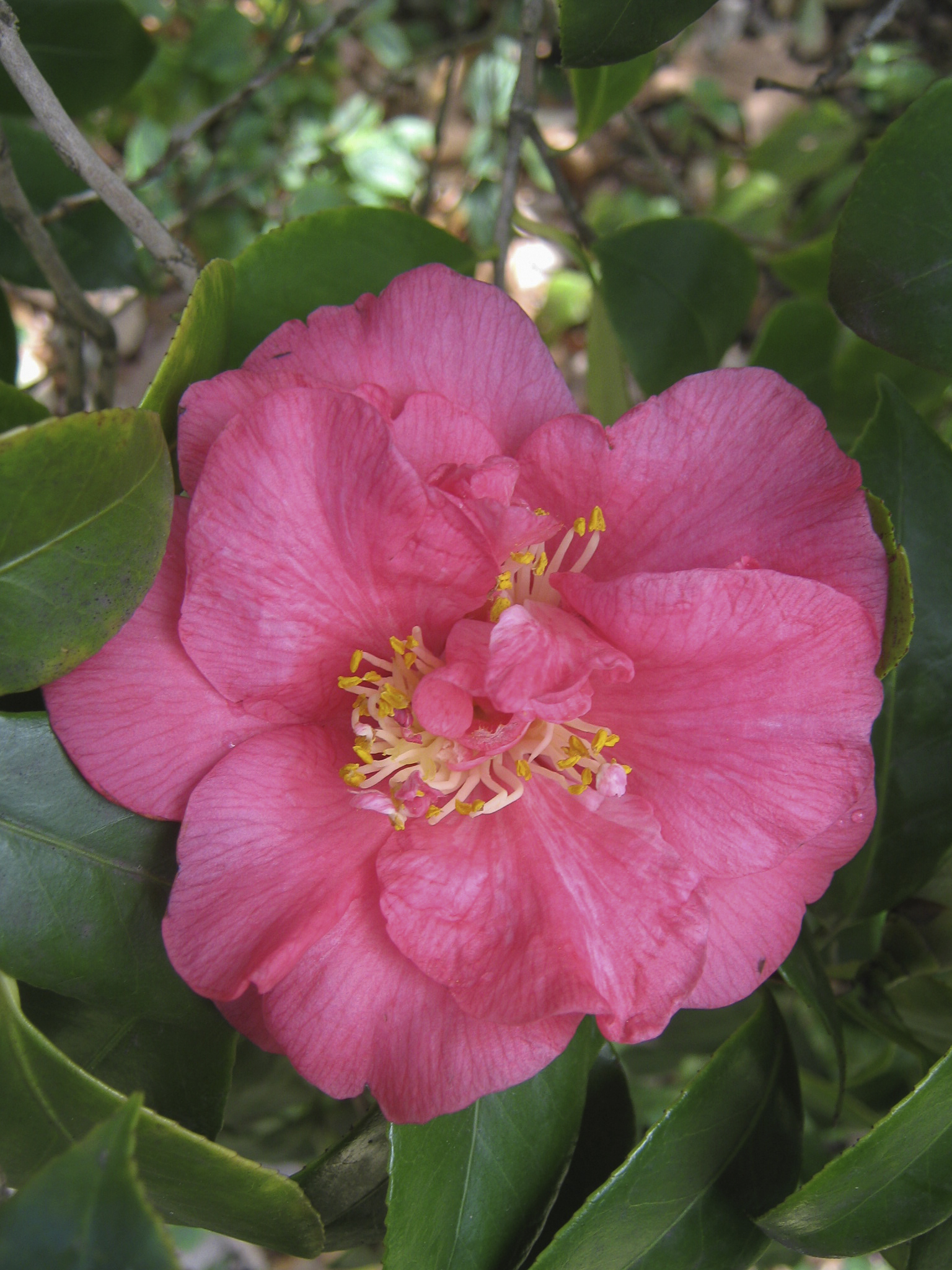
Camellia japonica 'Beverley Caffin Rosea', Waterhouse 1947

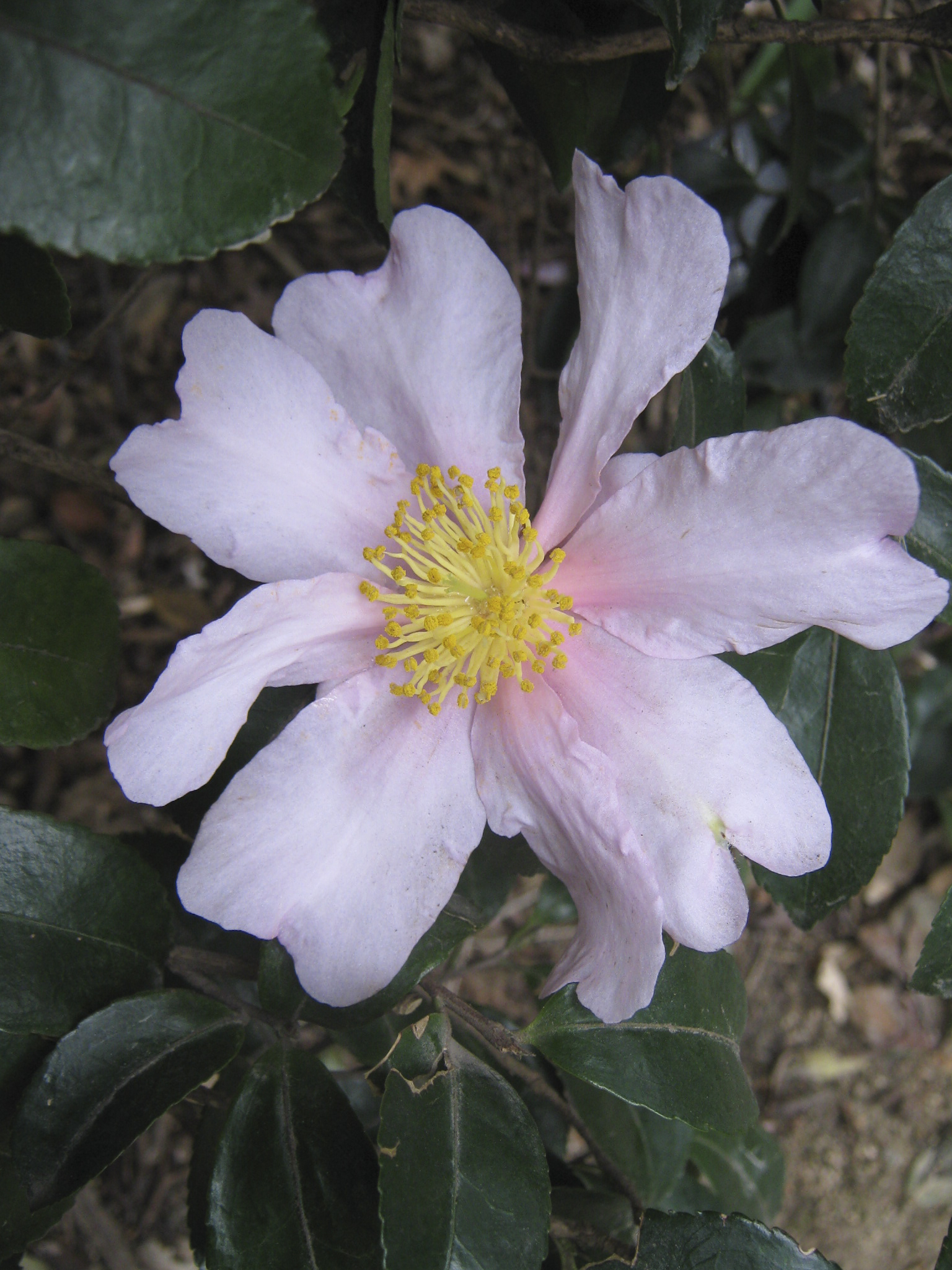
Camellia sasanqua 'Exquisite' (Waterhouse), Waterhouse 1947

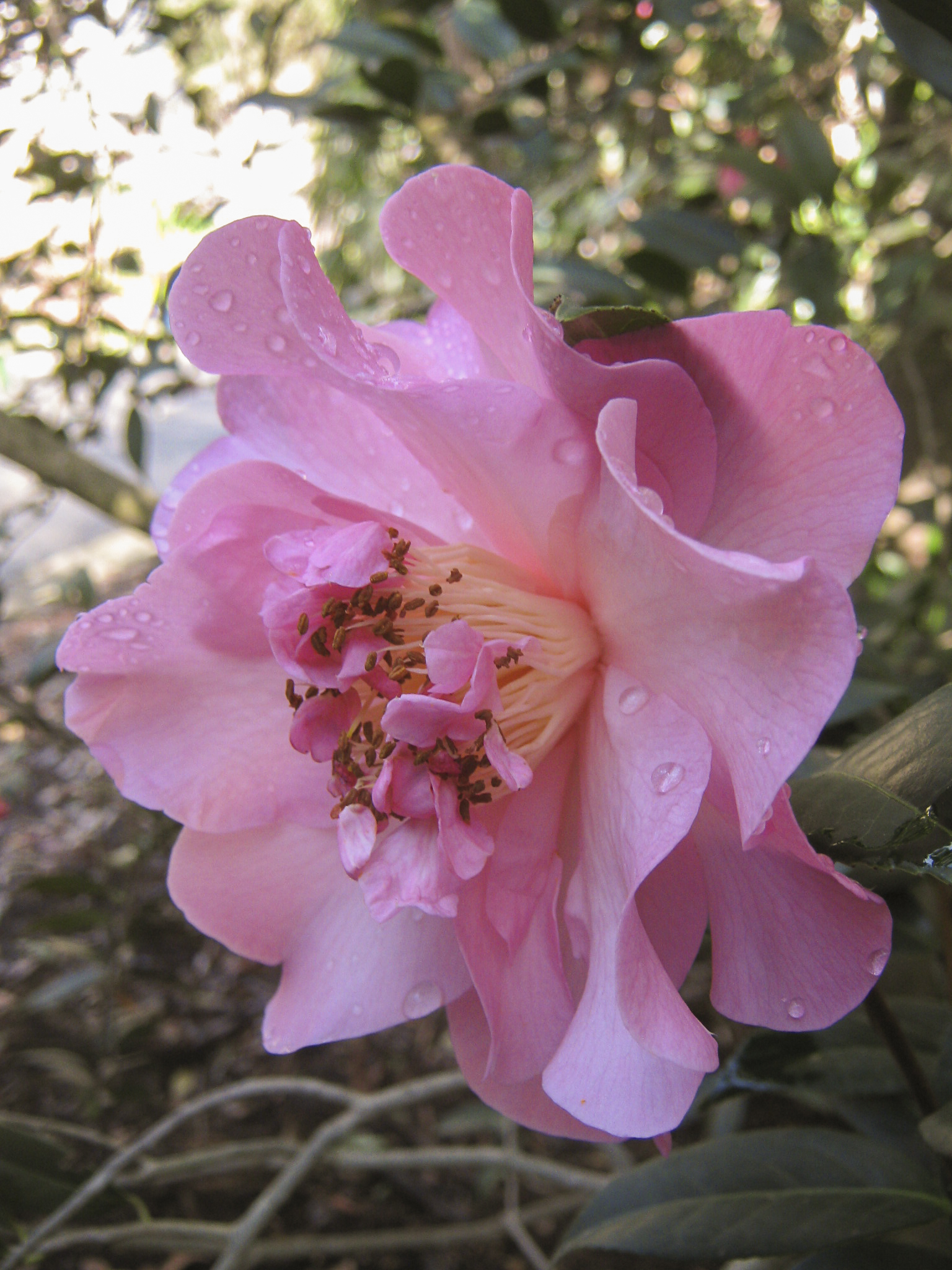
Camellia X williamsii 'Lady Gowrie', Waterhouse 1951

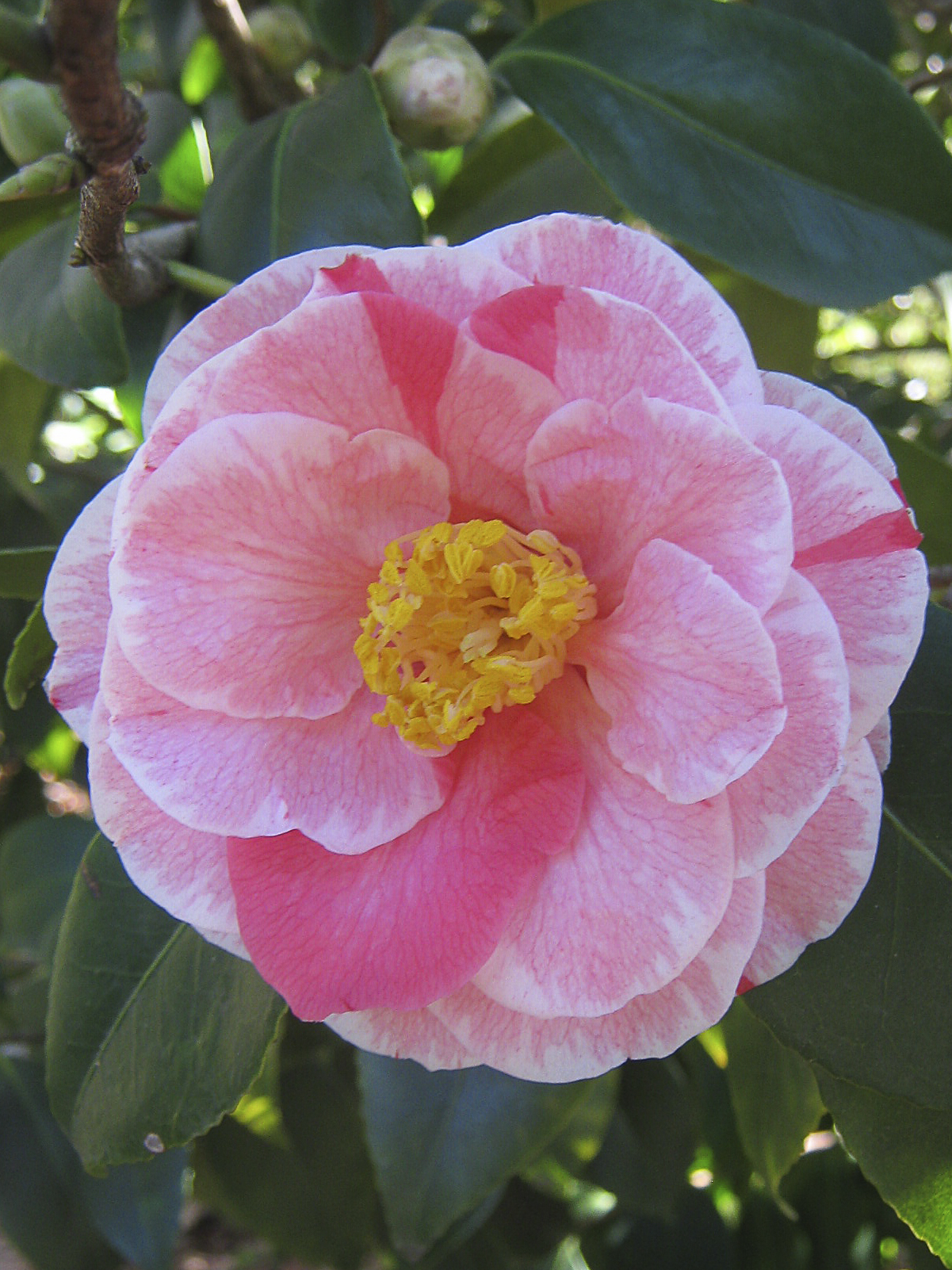
Camellia japonica 'Nancy Bird', Waterhouse 1952

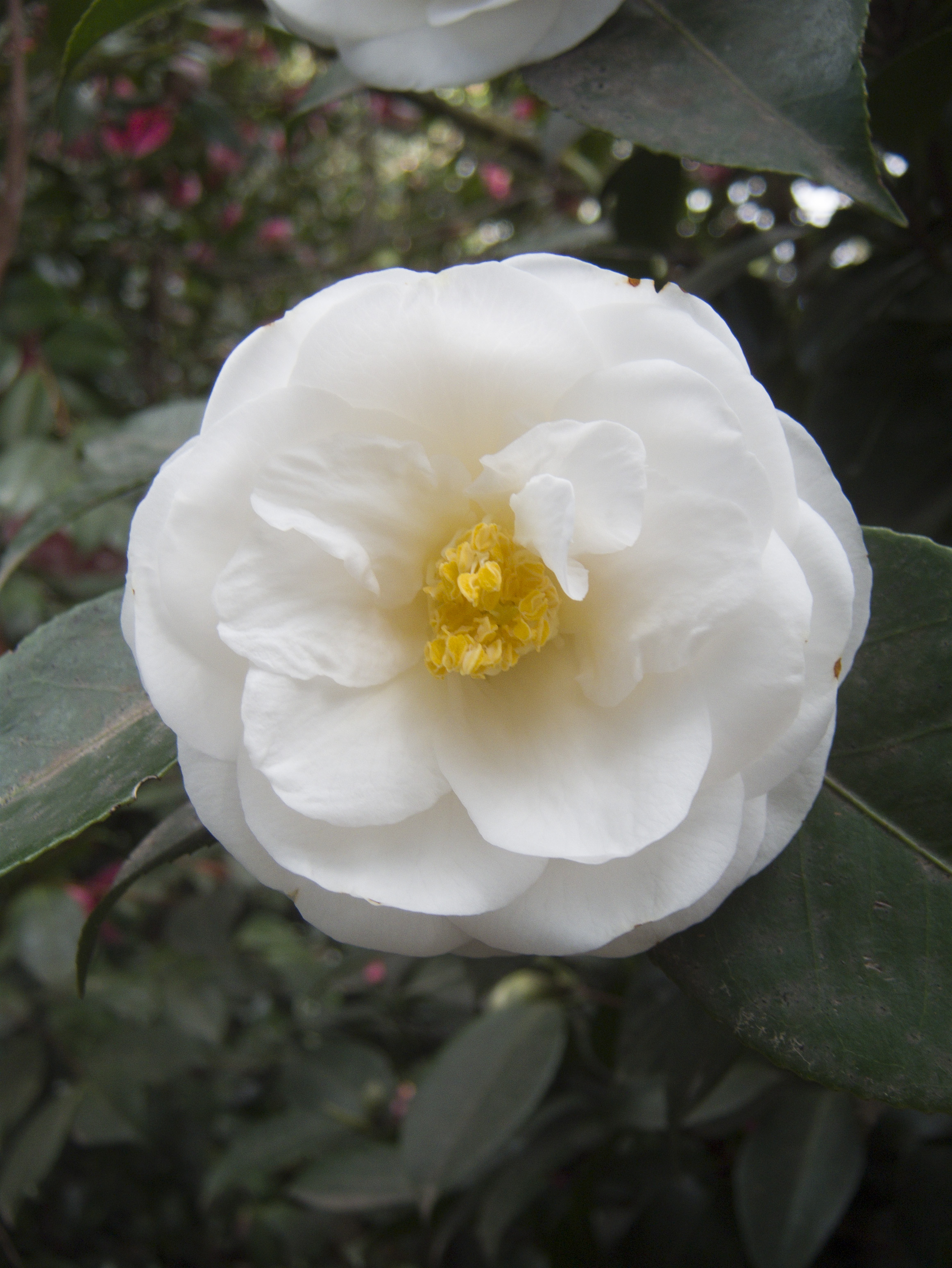
Camellia japonica 'Janet Waterhouse', Waterhouse 1952

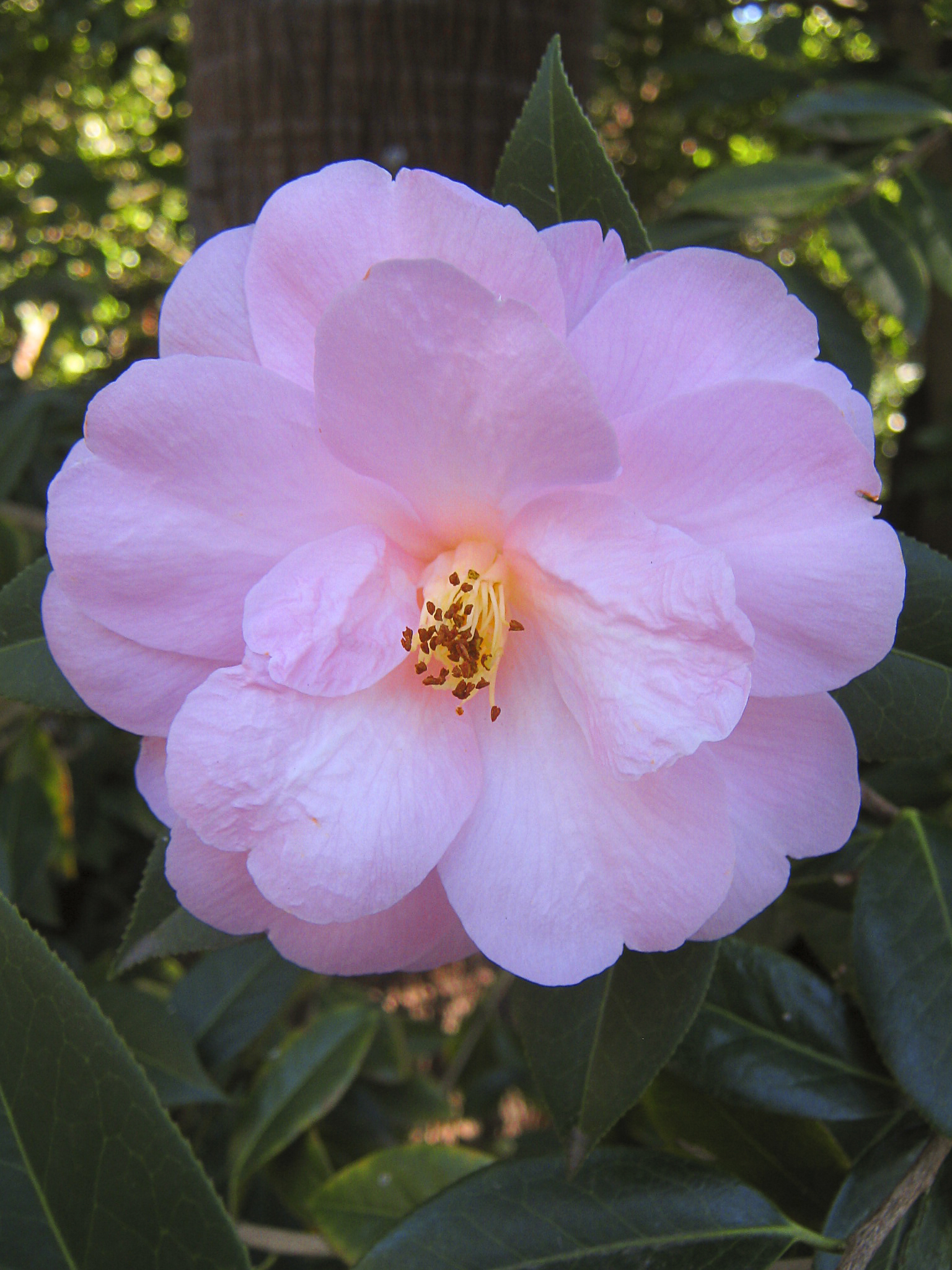
Camellia X williamsii 'Margaret Waterhouse', Waterhouse 1957

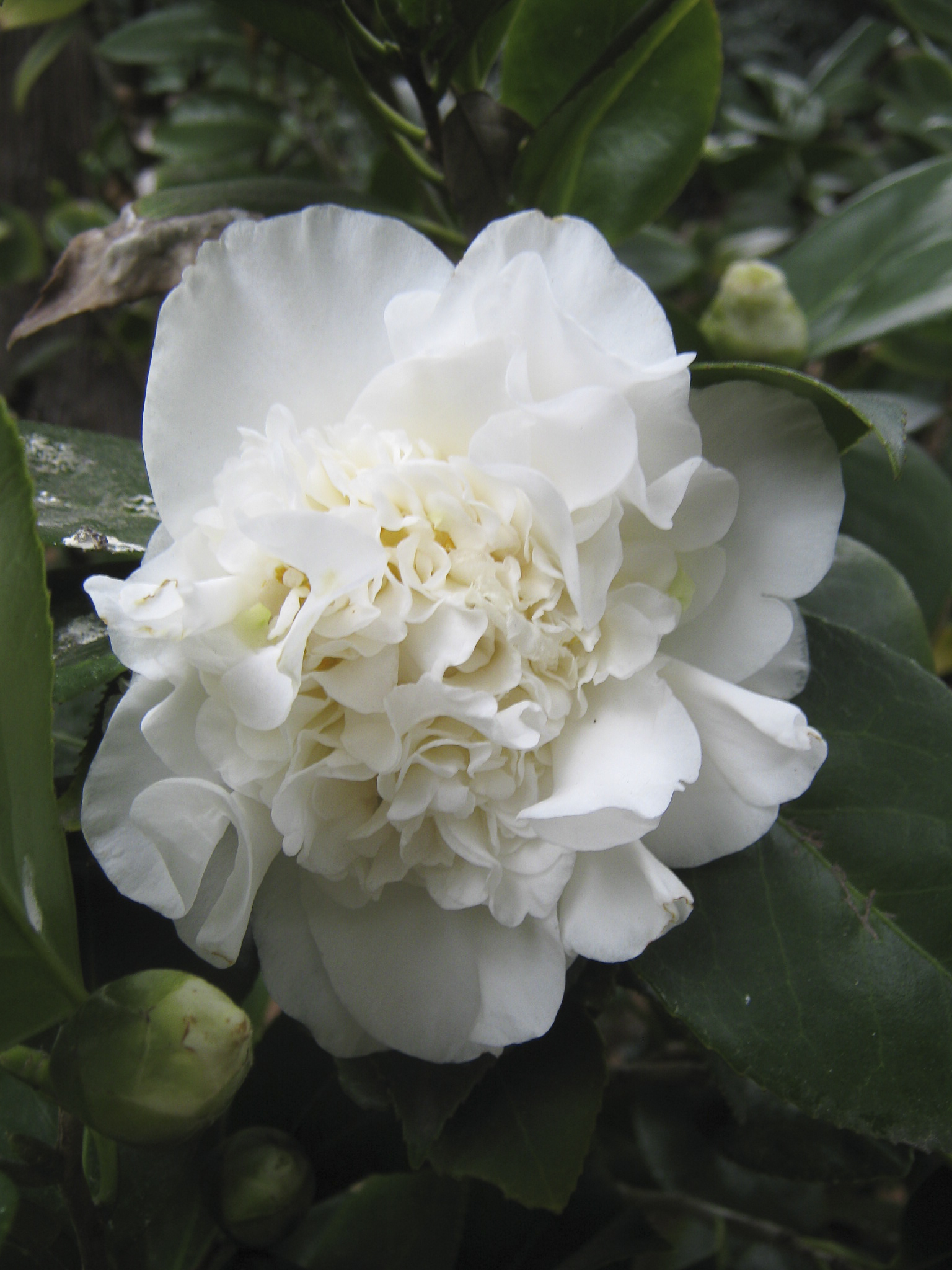
Camellia japonica 'Merrillees', Waterhouse 1957

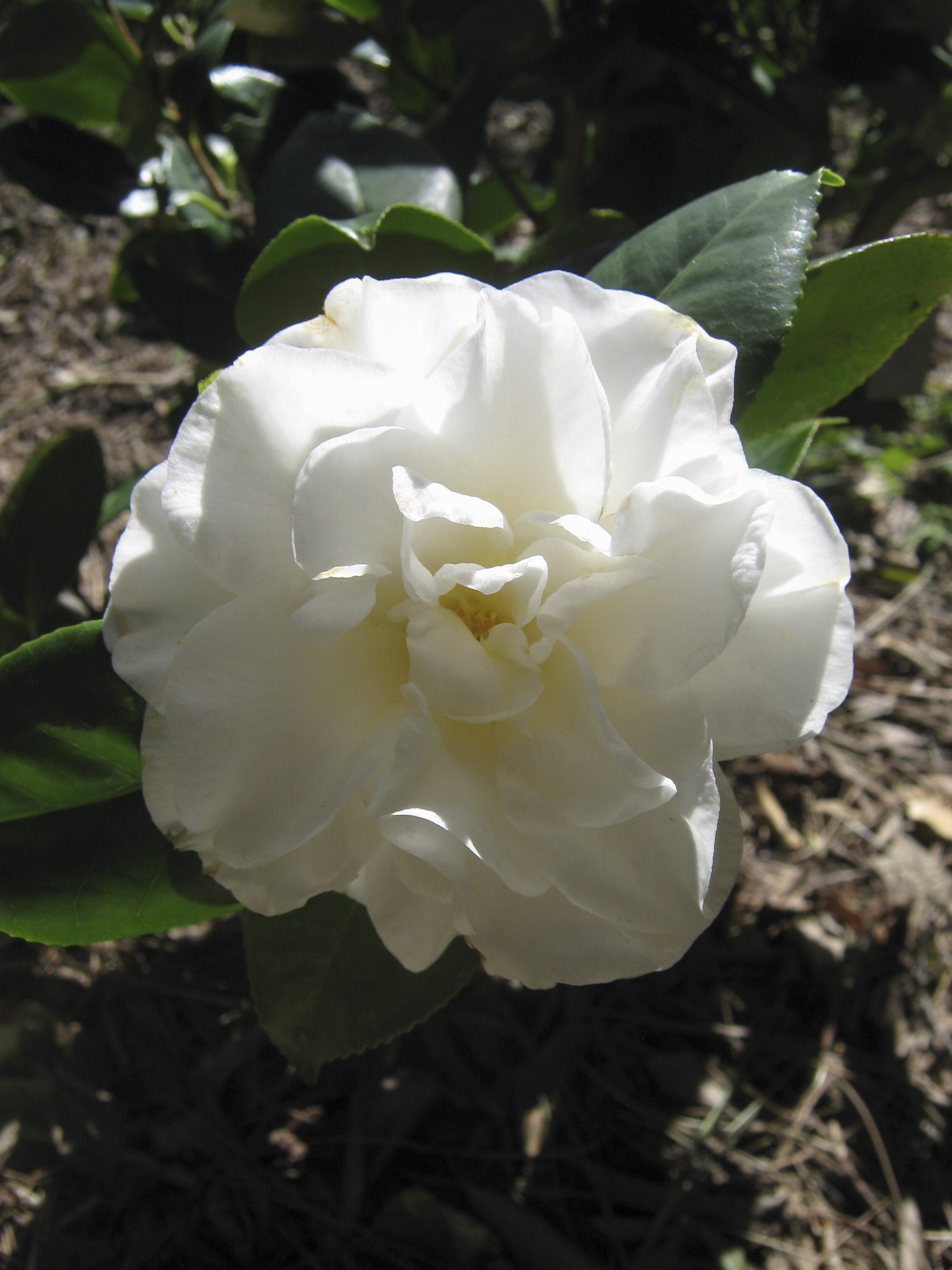
Camellia japonica 'Polar Bear', Waterhouse 1957

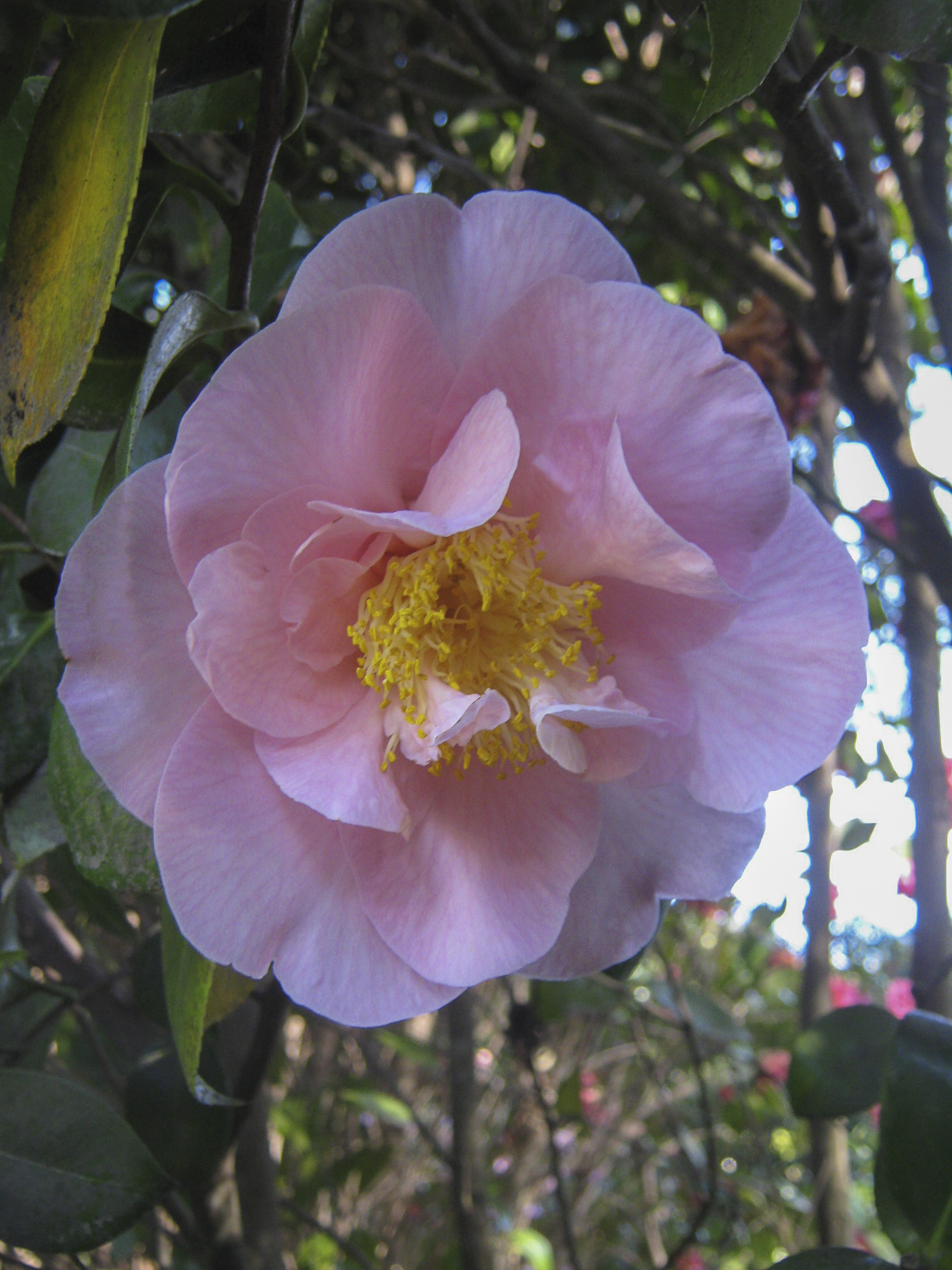
Camellia japonica 'Betty Cuthbert', Waterhouse 1962

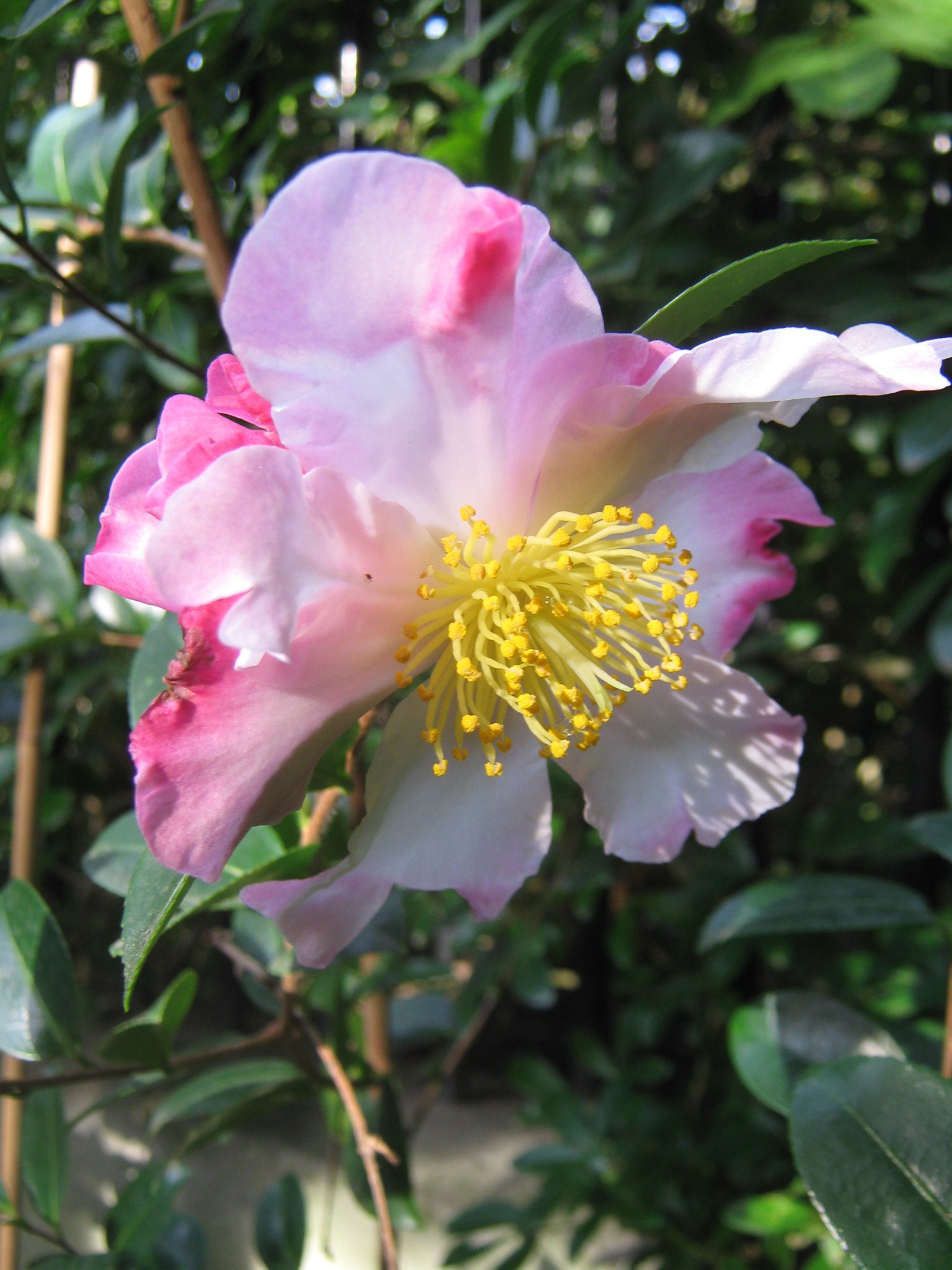
Camellia sasanqua 'Weroona', Waterhouse 1963

Western interest in camellias as luxury flowers had waxed 1840–1880 then waned as they lost favour to orchids. From 1914 Waterhouse's writing and breeding eventually brought about a renewal of interest 1930–1960 in camellias (even in Japan), now as warm-climate woodland trees. His influence thus preceded by many years that of Sacheverell Sitwell's 1936 book Old Fashioned Flowers, often named as starting the revival.

Waterhouse early formed the opinion that the rich and well watered soils of the North Shore were ideally suited to plants found in forest glades, most notably Japanese azaleas and camellias. But the names of available camellias were deeply confused, and the best means of breeding and growing them was poorly understood. In 1952 Waterhouse and four other enthusiasts founded what became the Australian Camellia Research Society. By 1958 it had 320 members. Waterhouse became one of the world's leading scholars of camellias – the International Camellia Society, of which he became the first president in 1962, has a register containing over 150 entries on camellias which Waterhouse identified, bred, discovered, renamed or reclassified. Among these were camellias originally imported to colonial New South Wales or raised there by Sir William Macarthur of Camden Park 1820–61. The enormous job of rationalising Camellia names in Australia was done by Waterhouse, A. W. Jessep of the Melbourne Botanic Gardens, and Walter Hazelwood of Hazelwoods' Nursery outside Sydney.

In 1970 Waterhouse assembled a national collection of camellias on two hectares in the Sutherland Shire (at Caringbah), Sydney. The collection was renamed at his death the E. G. Waterhouse National Camellia Gardens. It contains more than 450 cultivars and species.

Growing many camellias led to discovering natural seedlings and sports, as well as propagating known varieties and making deliberate crosses – starting with 'Plantation Pink' in 1942. Many of his named original varieties are still commercially available.

=== Camellias raised by Waterhouse ===
Name	Date	Type	Form and colour	Extant
Plantation Pink	1942	C. sasanqua	Single pink	Yes
Beverley Caffin	1944	Seedling of 'Jean Lyne'?	Double white with carmine flakes	Yes
Somersby	1944	C. japonica	Ruby red with darker edges, double rose to peony form	Yes
Waverley	1944	C. japonica	Cherry-red, semi-double with undulating petals and golden stamens	Yes
Bowen Bryant	1946	C. x williamsii hybrid	Semi-double rose pink	Yes
Charles Colbert	1946	C. x williamsii hybrid	Semi-double, incurved amaranth rose	Yes
Clarrie Fawcett	1946	C. x williamsii hybrid	Semi-double amaranth rose	Yes
Crinkles	1946	C. x williamsii hybrid	Semi-double, crinkled amaranth rose petals	Yes
E. G. Waterhouse	1946	C. x williamsii hybrid	Imbricated pink	Yes
Farfalla	1946	C. x williamsii hybrid	Single pink hanging bell	Yes
Henry Price	1946	C. japonica	Deep crimson double	Yes
Lilian Pitts	1946	C. japonica	Single to semi-double white flaked carmine	Yes
Sayonara	1946	C. x williamsii hybrid	Semi-double clear pink	Yes
Beverley Caffin Rosea	1947	Sport of 'Beverley Caffin'	Semi-double, rose-red	Yes
Exquisite (Waterhouse)	1947	C. sasanqua	Palest pink single	Yes
Lilian Pitts Rosea	1947	Sport of 'Lilian Pitts'	Single to semi-double pink flaked carmine	
Maroona	1948	C. japonica	Wine red anemone form	Yes
Mignonne	1949	C. sasanqua seedling	Light pink formal double	Yes
Lady Gowrie	1951	C. x williamsii hybrid	Loose pink semi-double	Yes
Andromeda	1952	Seedling from 'Sodegakushi'	Double white with carmine streaks	Yes
Adrian Feint	1952	C. japonica	Semi-double white with crimson stripes	Yes
Campanella	1952	Seedling of 'Suibijin'	Single light pink	Yes
Dainty Maiden	1952	Seedling of 'Suibijin'	Semi-double rhodamine pink	Yes
Janet Waterhouse	1952	C. japonica	Semi-double pure white	Yes
Nancy Bird	1952	C. japonica	Semi-double, pale rose with crimson streaks	Yes
Roberta	1952	Sport of 'Paul Jones'	Large semi-double light pink	
Robin	1952	C. japonica	Single cherry red	Yes
Shocking Pink	1955	C. saluenensis seedling	Tyrian rose to formal double	Yes
E. G. Waterhouse variegated	1957	Sport of 'E. G. Waterhouse'	Pink splotched white	Yes
Margaret Waterhouse	1957	C. x williamsii hybrid	Semi-double soft pink	Yes
Merrillees	1957	C. japonica	Large, informal double white	Yes
Polar Bear	1957	Seedling of 'Great Eastern'	Large creamy-white showing stamens	Yes
Ellamine	1958	C. saluenensis hybrid	Single pink	Yes
Kurrajong	1959	Seedling of 'Great Eastern'	Creamy white formal double	Yes
Paul Jones Supreme	1958	Seedling of 'Paul Jones'	Semi-double white with carmine stripes	Yes
Mars Variegated	1960	Virus-variegated form of 'Mars'	Semi-double turkey red blotched white	Yes
Betty Cuthbert	1962	Seedling of 'Yoijibin'	Informal double, Neyron pink	Yes
Moonflower	1962	C. japonica	Large single white	
St Ives	1962	C. japonica	Large loose informal white, peppered with carmine spots	
Sylphide	1962	C. japonica	Medium large pink informal double	
Tatters	1962	C. x williamsii	Medium informal double white	Yes
Weroona	1963	C. sasanqua	Semi-double white rose-stained edges	Yes
Lady's Maid	1964	Seedling of 'Lady Gowrie'	Semi-double light orchid pink	Yes
Candy Stripe (Waterhouse)	1965	Seedling of 'Doris Tagg'	White with red radial stripes	Yes
Barbara Mary	1965	C. japonica	Scented, blush pink, peony form	Yes
Bells	1965	C. x williamsii hybrid	Single, mauvy pink	
Red Moon	1965	C. japonica	Deep rose red, semi-double	Yes
Sheridan	1965	C. japonica	Single rose-red trumpets with bluish veins	Yes
Tahiti	1965	C. japonica	Medium bright red single, spreading stamens	Yes
Glacier	1968	Seedling of 'Somersby'	Semi-double snow white	Yes
Caroline Simpson	1970	Sport of 'Lady Vansittart White'	Single white with centre heavily veined pink	
Mimsie	1970	C. sasanqua seedling	Single to semi-double slatey pink	
Mary Armati	1971	C. uraku seedling	Semi-double blush pink	
Alex Blackadder	1972	Seedling of 'Suibijin'	Claret-rose semi-double	

== Collecting ==
Waterhouse began collecting art in the 1920s. He was a discerning collector of fine pieces from China, Persia and Europe. In particular he collected Persian rugs and bowls and Chinese scrolls, porcelain, roof tiles and paintings. The Tang was a favoured period. Contemporary photos of the interior of Eryldene show the walls covered in Chinese art and watercolours of camellias. He was a trustee of the Art Gallery of New South Wales 1938–1962, the last two years as president.

== Honours ==
In 1933 Waterhouse was knighted by the king of Italy for his contribution to Italian culture abroad. Waterhouse received the Goethe Medal in 1957 for his work as a Germanist.

In 1962, the year the International Camellia Society was founded, he was awarded an OBE for services to the community. The Royal Horticultural Society in 1966 awarded him its Veitch Memorial Medal for services to horticulture. In 1976 he became a CMG for services to horticulture.

== Death ==
Waterhouse died on 17 August 1977 at Killara. He was 96. Janet had died at 88 in 1973. The Ku-ring-gai Council bought his house and land from the Waterhouse family for $150,000, and under Council aegis The Eryldene Trust assumed ownership in 1981.

== Publications ==
• Waterhouse, E. G.; Snowden, J. A. (1913). The initial stage in French by the direct method : a handbook for teachers containing detailed lesson-notes for fifty-two lessons. Sydney: W. A. Gullick, Government Printer.

• Waterhouse, Eben Gowrie (1914). The teaching of the French verb : being an outline method for the presentation and practice of the tenses and moods. Sydney: Teachers' College Press.

• Waterhouse, E. G. (12 November 1925). "The Garden and the Home: being a lecture to the NSW Institute of Architects, 4 November 1925". Building: The Magazine for the Architect, Builder, Property Owner and Merchant. 37 (219): 39–50. Probably his most extensive treatment of the relation of garden to house.

• Waterhouse, Eben Gowrie, ed. (1932). Liederbuch. Sydney: Shakespeare Head Press.

• Waterhouse, Eben Gowrie (1932). Goethe, Centenary Address. Glebe, NSW: Australasian Medical Publishing Co. Rare copies in the Mitchell Library and the Macquarie University Library, Sydney.

• Waterhouse, Eben Gowrie; Feint, Adrian (illustrator); Jones, Paul (illustrator) (1947). Camellia Quest. Sydney: Ure Smith. The print run of 550 deluxe copies sold out in a month. According to The Oxford Companion to Australian Gardens, Waterhouse's Camellia Quest and Camellia Trail are "arguably the most beautiful garden books published in Australia".

• Waterhouse, Eben Gowrie; Jones, Paul (illustrator) (1952). Camellia Trail. Sydney: Ure Smith. A print run of 1,000 deluxe copies.

• Sparnon, Norman; Waterhouse, Eben Gowrie (1968). The Magic of Camellias; Creative Ideas for Japanese Flower Arrangement. Sydney: Ure Smith. Another deluxe production. Seventy-eight camellias are shown in 158 photographs, often in colour and mostly shown in ikebana arrangements. Waterhouse provides each camellia – ten of them bred by himself – with an authoritative description.

== See also ==
- Landscape design

Government offices
Preceded by William Herbert Ifould	President of the Board of Trustees of the Art Gallery of New South Wales; 1960–1962	Succeeded by Sir Erik Langker
