= Alexander William Jessep =

Australian Botanist

Alexander William Jessep (27 March 1892 – 20 March 1991) was an Australian botanist, director of the Royal Botanic Gardens, Melbourne from 1941 to 1957.

== History ==
Jessep was born in Tinamba, Gippsland, Victoria, son of James Jessep (1860 – 12 June 1934) of "Roonsleigh", Tinamba. and Jessie Jessep (c. 1860 – 4 October 1933). He was educated at Sale Grammar School.

He was employed as a state school teacher when he enlisted with the 1st AIF in March 1916, serving with the 53rd Battery, 5th Divisional Artillery, 14th Field Artillery Brigade. He was severely injured in a gas attack in 1917, but responded to hospital treatment. He was repatriated, suffering bronchitis and a year later was released from hospital with the rank of lieutenant.

He had commenced university education before enlisting, and resumed his studies at the University of Melbourne, qualifying Bachelor of Science, Master of Agricultural Science and Diploma of Education. In 1926 he was appointed science master at Burnley Horticultural College (Burnley School of Horticulture and Primary Agriculture) and later became Principal. He also lectured part-time at the University of Melbourne. He was appointed Director of the School of Agriculture.

In November 1941 he succeeded Frederick James Rae as Director of the Royal Botanic Gardens, Melbourne and Government Botanist.

He retired in March 1957.

== Recognition ==
Jessep was awarded

- E. G. Waterhouse gold medal in 1967 for his contribution to the development of camellias in Australia
- Gold medal from the Royal Horticultural Society of Victoria in 1975 for outstanding service to horticulture
