= Adrian Feint =

Australian artist (1894–1971)

- Portrait of Adrian Feint by Max Dupain (1939)
- Born: 28 June 1894; Narrandera, New South Wales
- Died: 25 April 1971 (aged 76)
- Known for: Artist, designer, illustrator
- Notable work: Bookplates

Adrian George Feint (28 June 1894 – 25 April 1971) was an Australian artist. He worked in various media, and is noted for his bookplate designs.

== Education and military service ==
Feint was born in Narrandera, New South Wales. He studied at Sydney Art School from 1911 under Julian Ashton and Elioth Gruner. Enlisting at age twenty one with the Australian Imperial Forces, Feint embarked for France on 17 September 1916 from Sydney aboard HMAT Borda A30. He served with the rank of Private with the 15th Australian Field Ambulance and on 8 September 1918 he was given an official Recommendation for his service. Before being demobbed in 1919, he was granted three months leave to study at the Académie Julian in Paris. He studied plate etching from 1922 to 1926; woodblock-engraving from 1926 to 1928, with assistance from Thea Proctor in 1927; and oil painting beginning in 1938, with Margaret Preston. That year he joined and exhibited with Robert Menzies' anti-modernist foundation, the Australian Academy of Art, of which Proctor and Preston were also members.

== Artwork ==
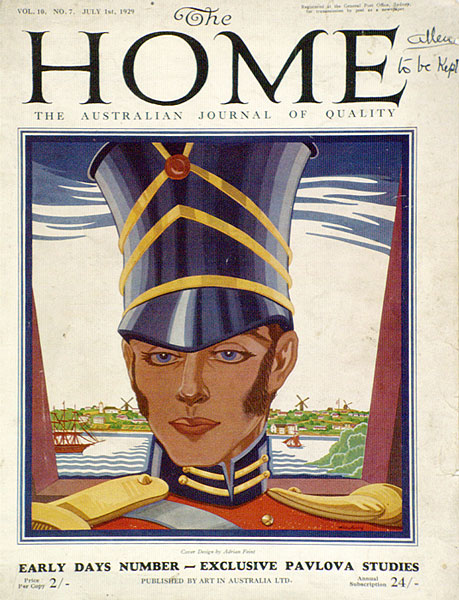
The Home Journal cover

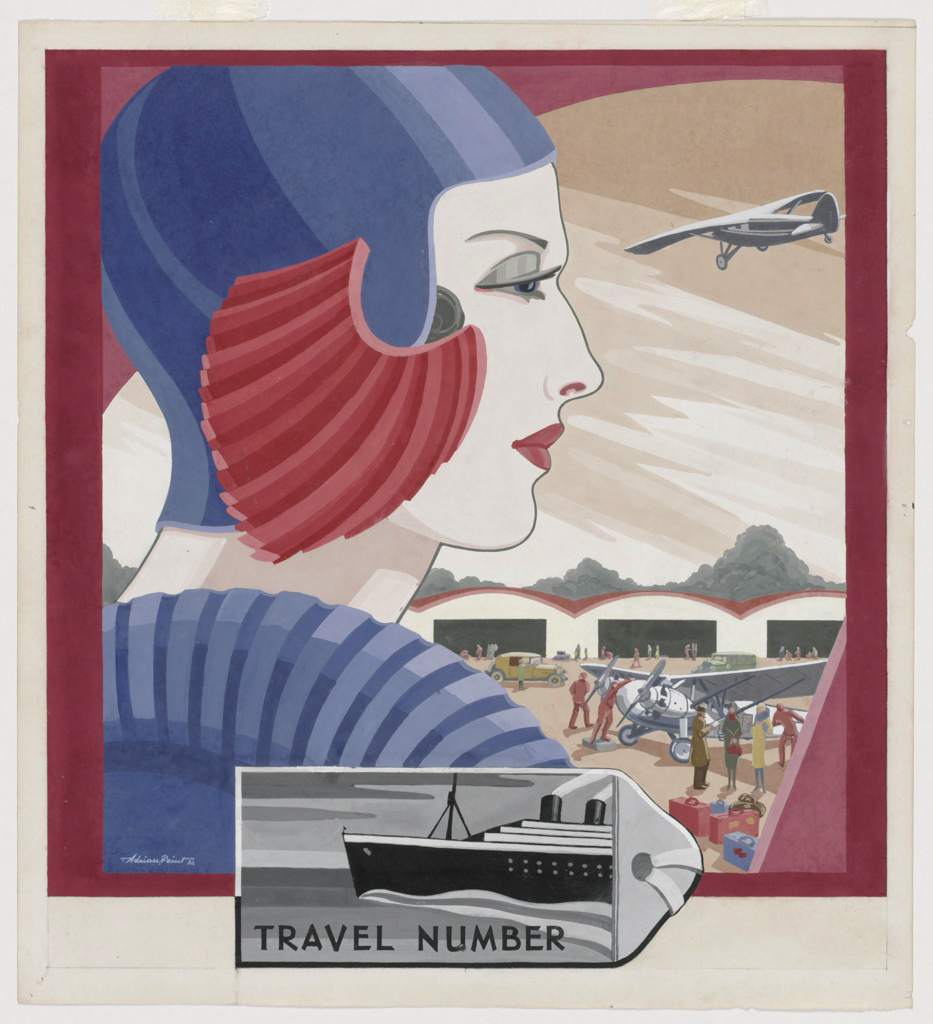
Cover design for Home magazine, by Adrian Feint, gouache on paper, 1930

He was co-director (with bookbinder Wal Taylor) and manager of Grosvenor Gallery, 219 George Street Sydney, from 1924 to 1928. Exhibitors included the now-famous Thea Proctor, Elioth Gruner, Margaret Preston, Roland Wakelin, Roy De Maistre and George Washington Lambert.

He was employed as assistant editor (to Sydney Ure Smith) of Art in Australia from 1928 to 1940, contributing many cover illustrations to this and filling many commissions for his advertising agency Smith and Julius. Between 1927 and 1939, Feint made 18 covers for Ure Smith's magazine The Home, including the famous illustration on the October 1928 issue in collaboration with Hera Roberts.

He abandoned graphic arts around 1939 (he reworked one bookplate in 1944) to work as a bookbinder with Benjamin Waite and to illustrate limited edition books.

== Flower Paintings ==
In 1939 an exhibition of Feint's oil paintings and sketches at the Grosvenor Galleries introduced a new phase in his artistic career, from woodcuts and drawings to oils. A newspaper review of the time referred to the imaginative depiction of hibiscus and lantana, the overwhelming opulence of colour, "saved from coarseness by the exquisite delicacy of the textures".

In the same year Feint was selected to paint a large mural for the Australian Pavilion at the New Zealand Centennial Exhibition in Wellington. Feint produced his design of Australian birds, accompanied by other prominent artists Frank Hinder, Douglas Annand, and William Dobell.

Feint's still life and landscapes, painted in the English decorative style, received critical acclaim through the 1940s and 1950s. This creativity was brought into focus with Adrian Feint: flower paintings, edited and published by Sydney Ure Smith in 1948. Galleries across Australia hold examples of Feint's work, including many still life flower paintings produced during these decades. The Art Gallery of New South Wales holds forty five of his works, including almost surreal paintings of flowers with hand-made objects. Flowers in Sunlight is such a work. A contemporary of Feint, the artist Douglas Dundas described his works as 'flower arrangements, meticulously designed, superbly painted, and set in a related environment of time and space'.

Feint's expertise in floral painting led to a camellia being named after him in 1952, C. japonica 'Adrian Feint'. The large white striped semi-double was bred by Professor E. G. Waterhouse, and Feint's paintings can be found in titles authored by Waterhouse, Camellia Quest and Camellia Trail.

== Sydney and Surrounds ==
Living and working in Sydney allowed Faint to explore the harbour and its surrounding foreshores. Apart from his interest in floral painting, Feint's work during the 1940s displayed his interest in the Australian coastal scene. Afternoon Collaroy, 1940, allows the viewer to look through a finely depicted tree to the beach beyond; the waves rolling towards bathers walking across the sand. Add to this the sun hat and the beach towel casually draped over a railing sets the mood for this afternoon at the beach. The Jetties, Palm Beach, 1942, a scene viewed through intricately entwined branches and Elizabeth Bay, Sydney, 1942, quite likely painted from Feint's own residence in Elizabeth Bay, the suburb he would live in for the rest of his life. The playful Tim and Pigeon, 1944, must surely also have been painted from Elizabeth Bay. Palm Beach, 1945, invites the viewer to an idyllic holiday scene through the depiction of protected ocean baths, tents, and caravans.

For artists in any field, a successful career required patrons and favourable social connections. Feint's star must have been in the ascendant for his portrait to be included in the work of photographer Alec Murray. His volume, The Alec Murray Album, showcases the elegant and the beautiful in their own private world.

== Post War Commissions ==
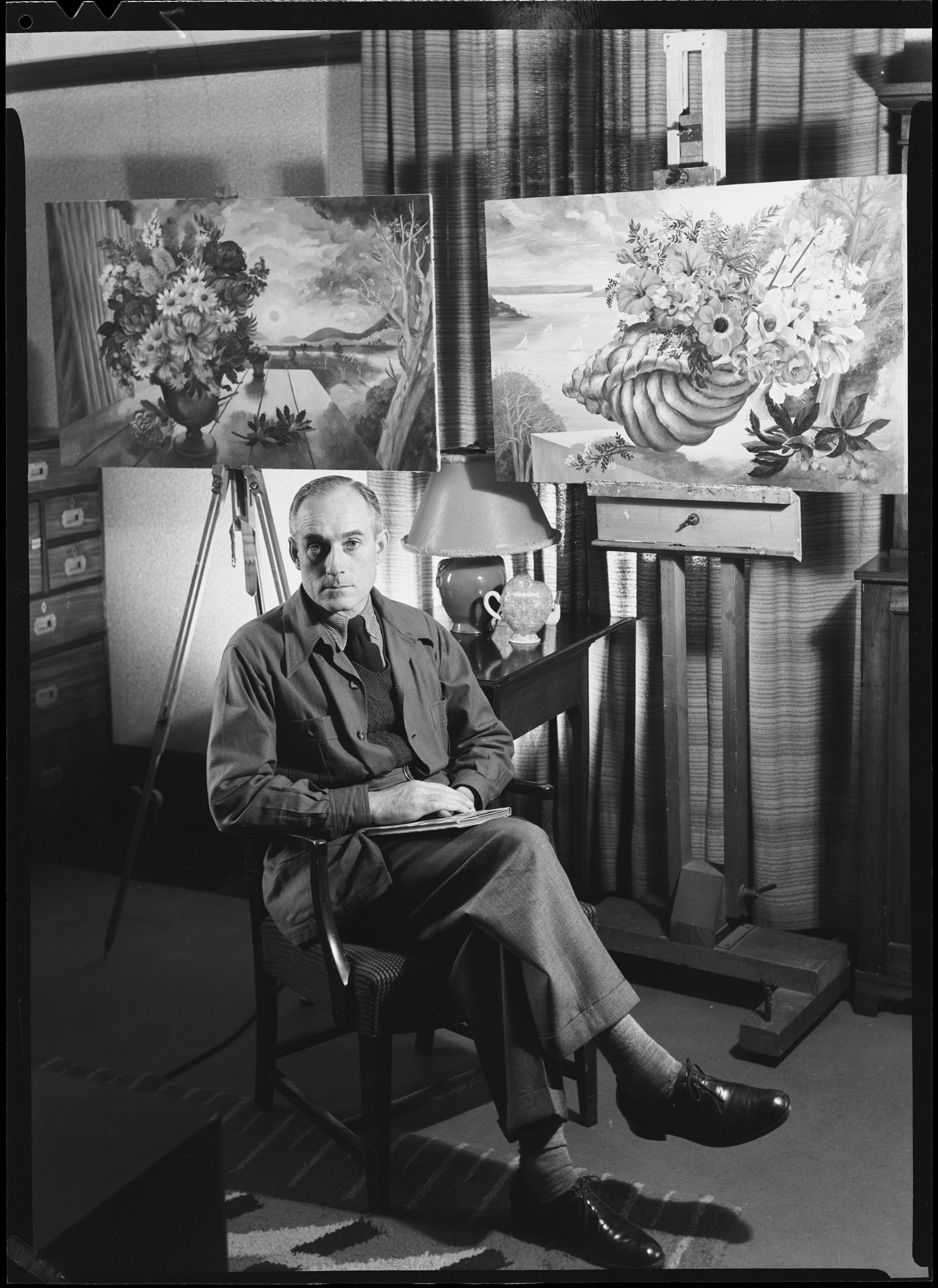
Portrait of Adrian Feint with murals for Orion Line shipping, Sydney, October 1946

By the end of World War II, Feint could justifiably lay claim to a number of titles; gallery director, bookplate designer, printmaker, illustrator, commercial artist, and painter. After downing his bookplate engraving tools, Feint turned his talents to a number of high-profile commercial projects.

The Orient Steam Navigation Company were re-fitting their ocean liner RMS Orion to resume service between Britain and Australia having served as an armed merchantman during the war. As reported in two local newspapers, “the Australian artist Mr Adrian Feint, of Elizabeth Bay, has been commissioned to paint the liner Orion's dining saloon decorations.” Feint would paint two scenes for the saloon, a landscape and the other a seascape. The paintings, “which took two months to complete, will be flown to London and hung in the ship."

One of the many activities planned for the tour of Australia by Queen Elizabeth and the Duke of Edinburgh in 1954 was a Royal Gala Performance. Feint's design was “selected for the cover of the Royal Gala Performance” at the Tivoli Theatre on 6 February. The eight page booklet with its lyrebird cover was published by the Organising Committee for the Royal Gala Performance.

== Bookplates ==
Feint's bookplates are regarded by many as his greatest legacy. Thea Proctor, Dorothea Mackellar, Ethel Turner, Ethel Curlewis, John Lane Mullins, Frank Clune, Peter Tansey and the Duke and Duchess of York were among those who commissioned personal ex libris plates. In 1930 his bookplate designs were recognised by an exhibition at the Division of Fine Arts, Library of Congress, Washington US (organised by the American Society of Bookplate Collectors and Designers), and in 1933 were highlights of the first International Exhibition of Bookplates held in Sydney. They are prized by collectors such as members of the American Society of Bookplate Collectors and Designers and the New Australian Bookplate Collectors Society. According to the checklist compiled by Thelma Clune, he produced 221 commissioned bookplates. Apart from Norman Lindsay, the only other Australian artist whose bookplates command anywhere the same interest is G. D. Perrottet.

== Legacy and death ==
At the time of his death in 1971, the Sydney Morning Herald described Feint as an artist “noted for his still life and flower pieces", commenting that his works are shown in public and private galleries across Australia.

The 2009 publication Adrian Feint: Cornucopia, reveals a continuing interest in Feint's oil paintings and reasserts his contribution to Australian art.

Bookplates by Adrian Feint

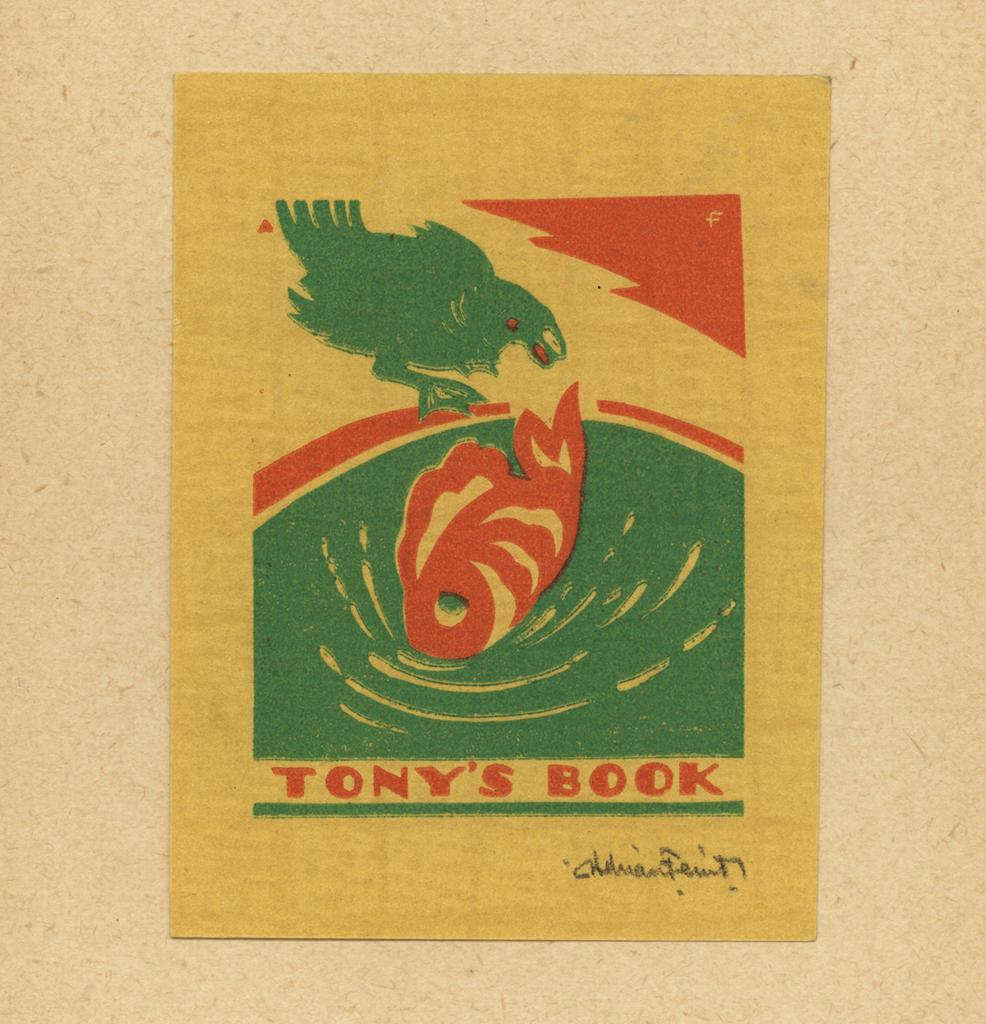
"Tony's Book"

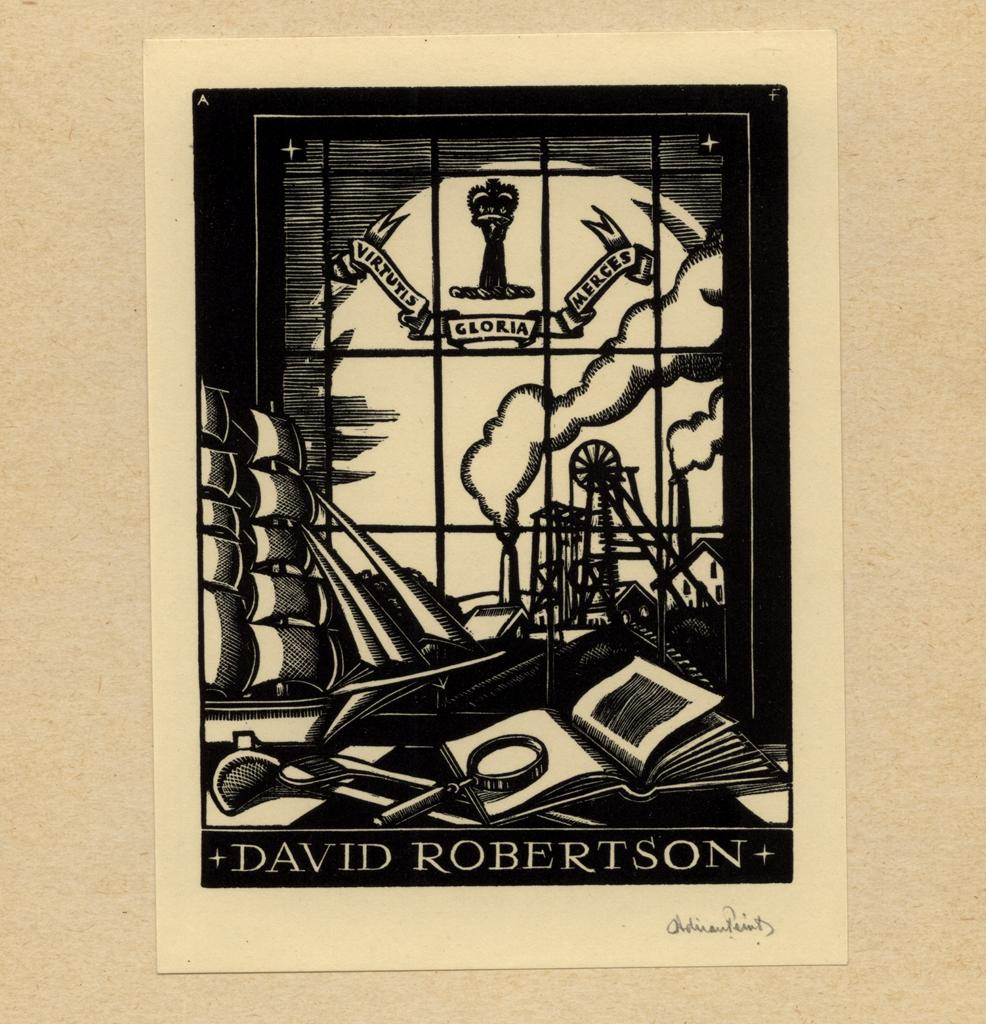
David Robertson

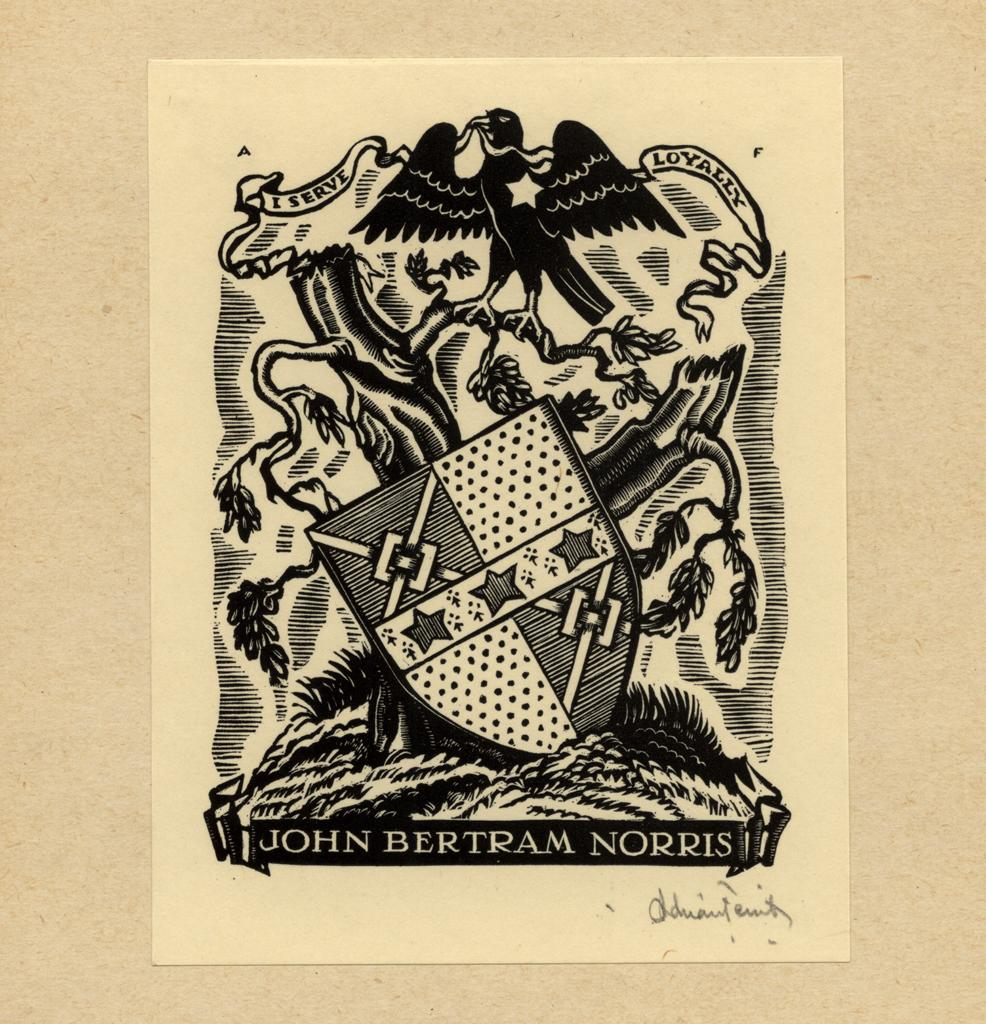
Bertram Norris

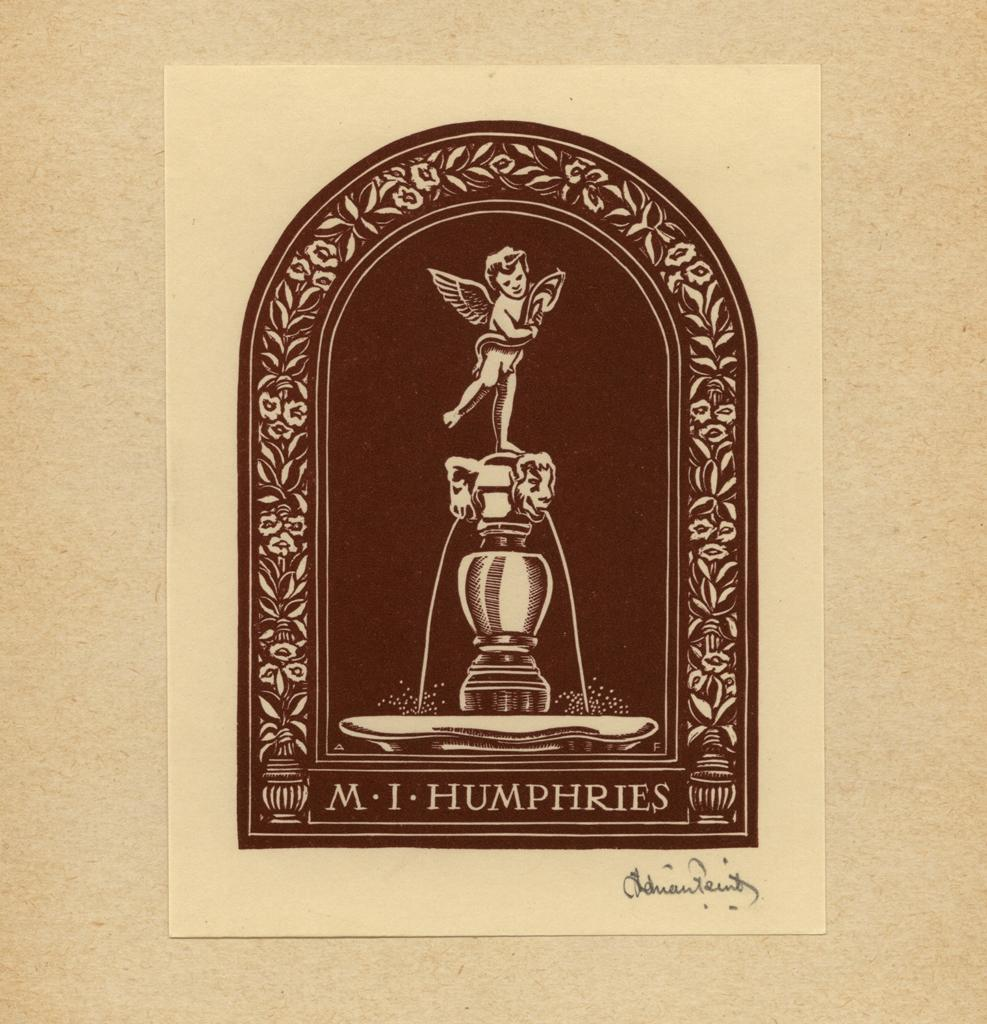
M. I. Humphries

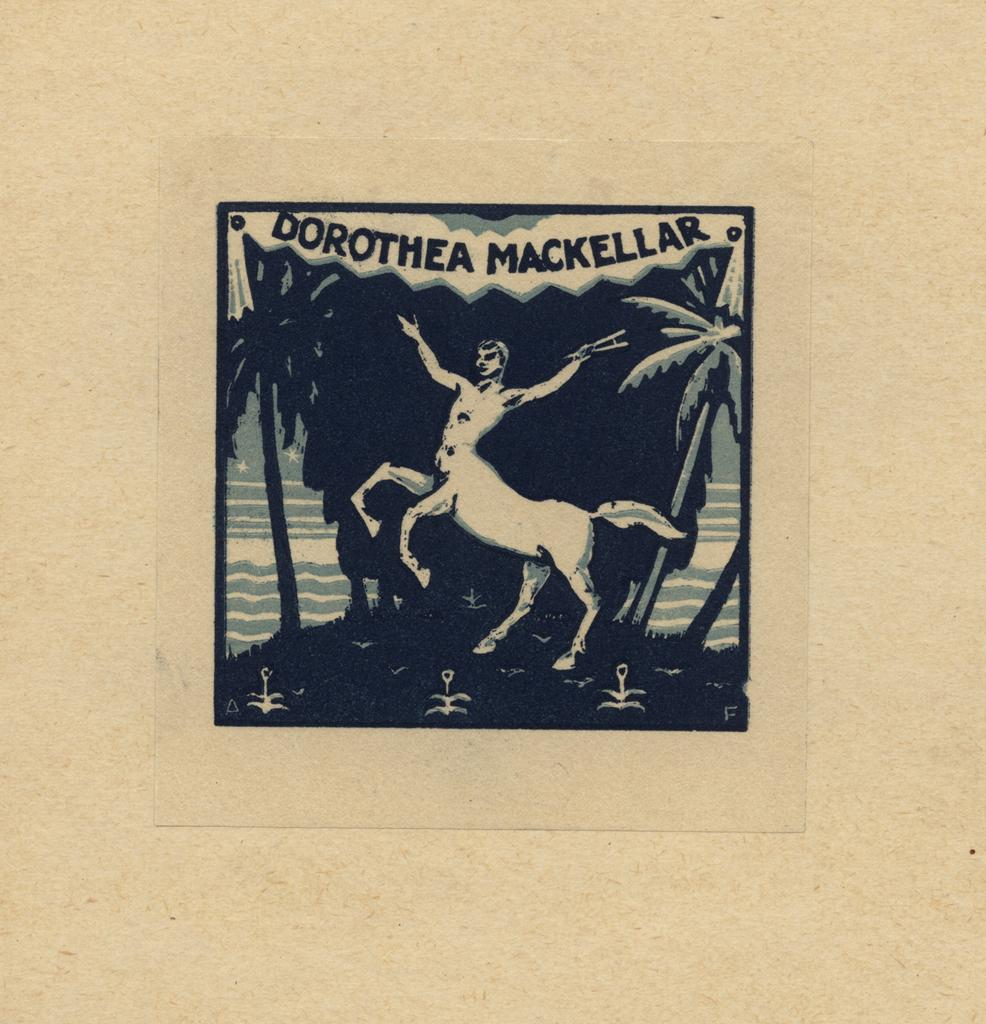
Dorothea MacKellar

== Awards and memberships ==
Feint was elected to the Society of Artists, and was a member of the Australian Painter-Etchers Society.

=== Awards ===
- Bookplate Association International first prize 1930 for Raoul Lempriere bookplate
- John Lane Mullins woodcut prize 1933
- George FitzPatrick 'Typical Australian woodcut' prize 1933
- His portrait, by Nora Heysen, hangs in the National Library, Canberra.

=== Exhibitions ===
An extensive exhibition of his work, including many privately owned examples, was mounted between March and June 2018 at Carrick Hill, whose previous owner was a generous patron of Australian art, Feint being a particular friend. Exhibits included a collection of bookplates, and other material, donated by Richard King to the Carrick Hill Trust under the Australian Government's Cultural Gifts Program.
