= Alexander Rae =

Alexander or Alex Rae may refer to:

- Alexander Rae (actor) (1782–1820), British actor and stage manager
- Alexander Rae (politician) (fl. 1850s), Canadian politician
- Alex Rae (American soccer) (fl. 1930s–1940s), American soccer player (Newark Germans, Kearny Scots, United States)
- Alex Rae (footballer, born 1946), Scottish football player (East Fife, Partick Thistle, Forfar)
- Alex Rae (footballer, born 1969), former Scottish football player and manager (Falkirk, Millwall, Sunderland, Wolves and Rangers; Dundee and St Mirren manager)
- Alex Rae (rugby union) (born 1986), English rugby union player (Northampton, Bedford)
