= John Rae (economist) =

Scottish-Canadian economist

John Rae (1 June 1796, Footdee, Aberdeen – 12 July 1872, Staten Island, NY), was a Scottish-Canadian economist.

== Life ==
Rae was one of six children to merchant shipbuilder John Rae and Margaret Cuthbert. He graduating from Marischal College (University of Aberdeen) in 1815 with the degree of Master of Arts, followed by two years of medicine at the University of Edinburgh.

Changes in family circumstances with his father's bankruptcy in 1820 led to Rae's move to Canada in 1822. He was located in Williamstown (Glengarry County), and later, Hamilton in Ontario, Canada, where his wife died of cholera. He was well acquainted with the Scottish/Canadian community and was affiliated with the Presbyterian Church of Scotland. In Canada, he worked as a timber trader, schoolteacher, and a doctor.

In 1834, he moved to Boston, and then New York, where he also worked as a teacher. He went on to Central America where he was a physician. He moved with gold-miners to California in 1849, and a couple of years later, poor and sick with malaria, he found enough money to board a ship to the Kingdom of Hawaiʻi, where he worked in many different professions. He was a medical officer for the Hawaiian Board of Health and vaccinated a number of native children with the smallpox vaccine. He was a geologist and wrote papers on the geology of the islands. He was also a historian in Hāna, Maui, writing articles for the newspaper Polynesian. He also wrote a number of manuscripts, but these were lost in a fire at Lahainaluna Seminary. His most famous work was the Statement of Some New Principles on the Subject of Political Economy.

His sister Ann was a schoolteacher who developed a series of textbooks which were among the earliest to incorporate Canadian content.

== Work ==
Rae's most famous work was the Statement of Some New Principles on the Subject of Political Economy. The book was republished in 1905 as The Sociological Theory of Capital. Influenced by both Adam Smith and David Hume, his influence lingered all the way to the 20th century; so much so that the economist Irving Fisher prefaced one of his books with Rae's, thanking him for contributions to modern economics even when very few had heard of his work.

== Influence ==
The Canadian Economics Association awards the John Rae prize every two years since 1994 to the Canadian economist with "the best research record for the past five years." The prize has been named after John Rae (1796–1872) who did most of his work in Canada and was "a genuine precursor of endogenous growth theory."

== Sources ==
- Blaug, Mark, ed. (1986). "Rae, John". Who's Who in Economics: A Biographical Dictionary of Major Economists 1700-1986 (2nd ed.). Wheatsheaf Books Limited lo. p. 705. ISBN 978-0-7450-0230-9 – via Internet Archive.
- Goodwin, Craufurd D.W. (1961). Canadian Economic Thought: The Political Economy of a Developing Nation 1814–1914. Durnham, NC and London: Duke University Press and Cambridge University Press. pp. 19 n., 45 n., 52, 57, 64, 69, 92–97, 106, 109, 122–127, 133 n., 199, 202 – via Internet Archive.
- Rae, John; Mill, John Stuart (August 1943). Hayek, F. A. (ed.). "John Rae and John Stuart Mill: A Correspondence". Economica. 10 (39): 253–255. doi:10.2307/2549988. JSTOR 2549988.
- James, R. Warren (1965). John Rae, political economist. An account of his life and a compilation of his main writings. Vol. 1 (Life and Miscellaneous Writings). Toronto: University of Toronto Press – via Internet Archive.; volume 2 (Statement of Some New Principles on the Subject of Political Economy)
- Schumpeter, Joseph A. (1954). Elizabeth Boody Schumpeter (ed.). History of Economic Analysis. New York: Oxford University Press. p. 468-469 – via Internet Archive.
