= The Home =

Australian magazine (1920–1942)

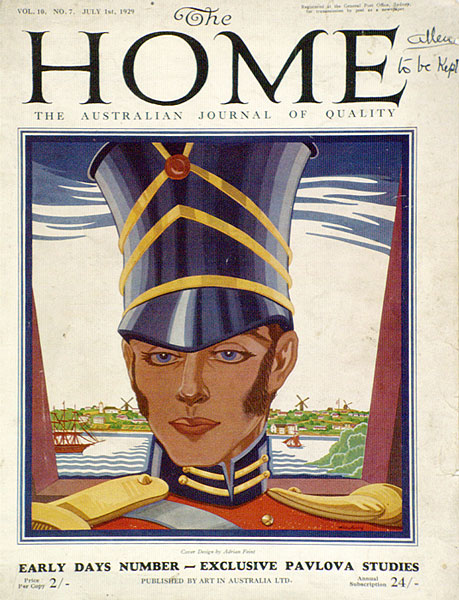
The Home cover image, July 1929

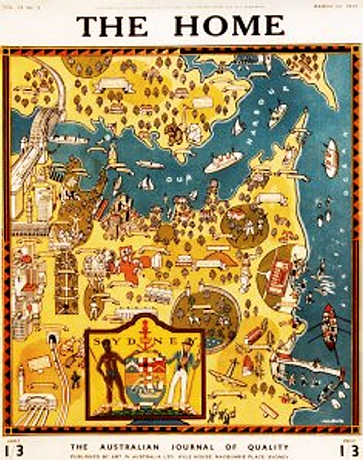
The Home cover image, 1 March 1932, showing a completed Sydney Harbour Bridge (upper left)

The Home was a high-quality Australian magazine published in Sydney, New South Wales, between 1920 and 1942. Starting as a quarterly publication, the magazine became bimonthly from July/August 1924 until 1926. It was then published monthly until it ceased publication in September 1942.

== History ==
Described as "the only Australian publication in the same league as its international counterparts Vogue, Harper's Bazaar, and Vanity Fair", The Home showcased the work of artists such as Thea Proctor, Margaret Preston, Hera Roberts, and Adrian Feint, whose work appeared on many of the covers. Artists such as Proctor, Feint, Roberts and photographer Harold Cazneaux "received the benefits of constant exposure and publicity" while the magazine exposed its readers to modern ideas about art and design in home furnishing and fashion. It contained interviews and book reviews as well. It also helped change the image of women as well as of advertising.

Originally published by Sydney Ure Smith under the imprint Art in Australia Ltd, the magazine was taken over by John Fairfax & Sons Ltd, publishers of The Sydney Morning Herald, in 1934, and Ure Smith severed his connection with the magazine in 1938.

Issues of The Home were included in a 2013 exhibition at the Art Gallery of New South Wales entitled "Sydney Moderns – Art for a New World".

== Digitisation ==
This publication has been digitised at Trove by the National Library of Australia.

== See also ==
- List of women's magazines
