= Thea Proctor =

Australian artist (1879–1966)

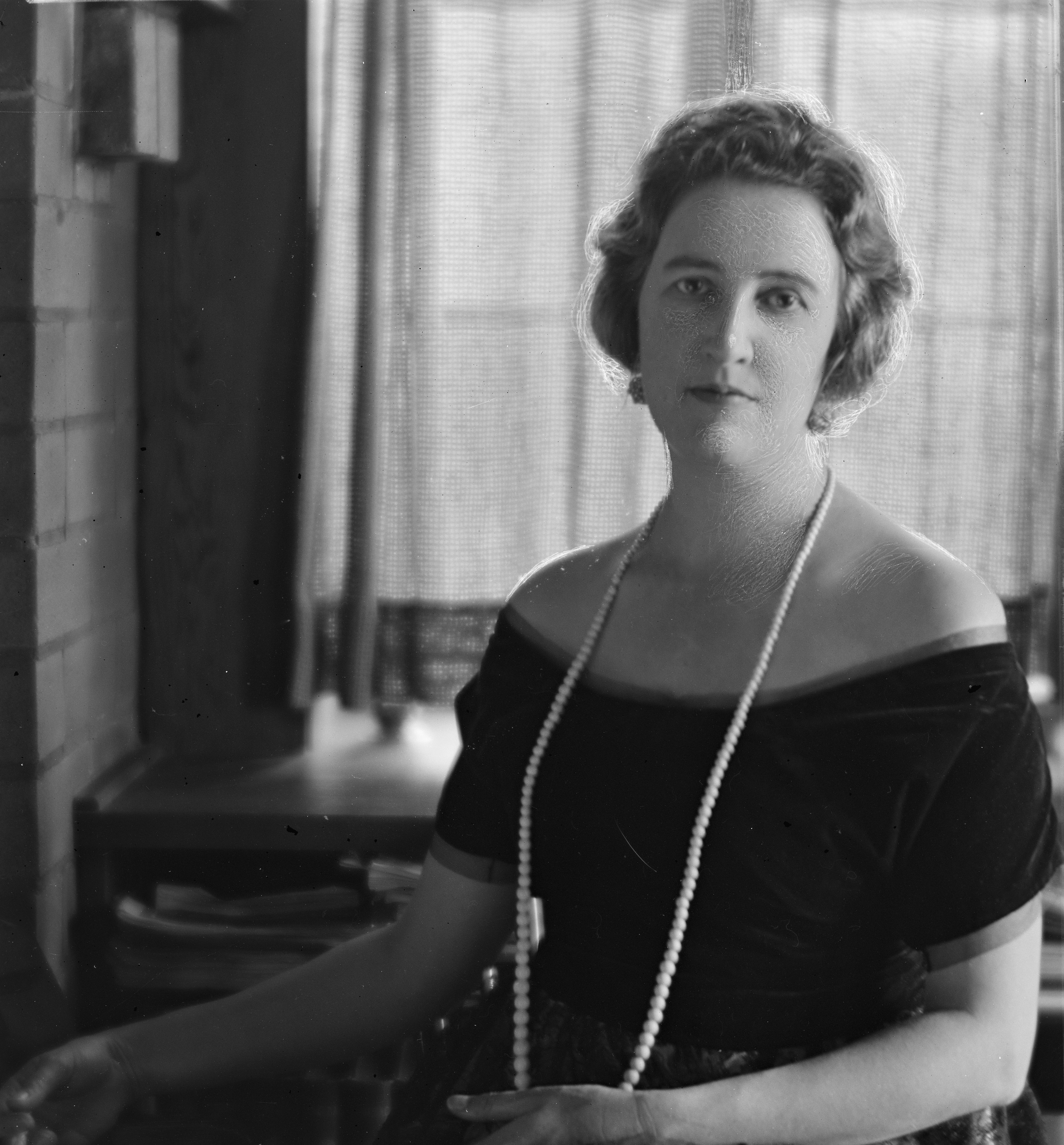
- Portrait of Thea Procter, 1922 by Harold Cazneaux
- Born: Alethea Mary Proctor; 2 October 1879; Armidale, New South Wales, Australia
- Died: 29 July 1966 (aged 86); Potts Point, New South Wales, Australia
- Education: Julian Ashton Art School; St John's Wood School of Art
- Known for: Painting

Alethea Mary Proctor (2 October 1879 – 29 July 1966) was an Australian painter, print maker, designer and teacher who upheld the ideas of 'taste' and 'style'.

== Biography ==
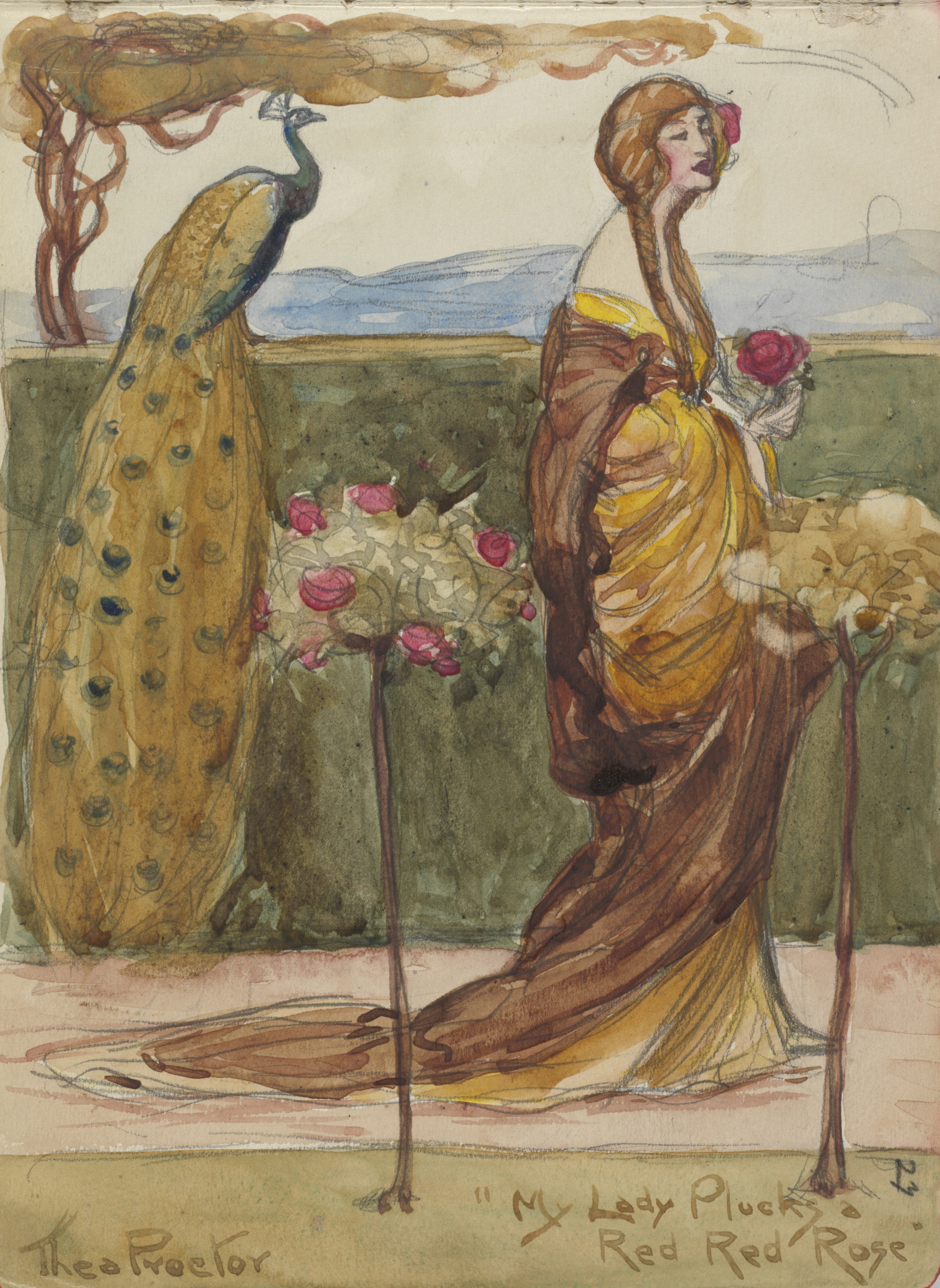
'My Lady Plucks a Red Red Rose,' Thea Procter, c.1905

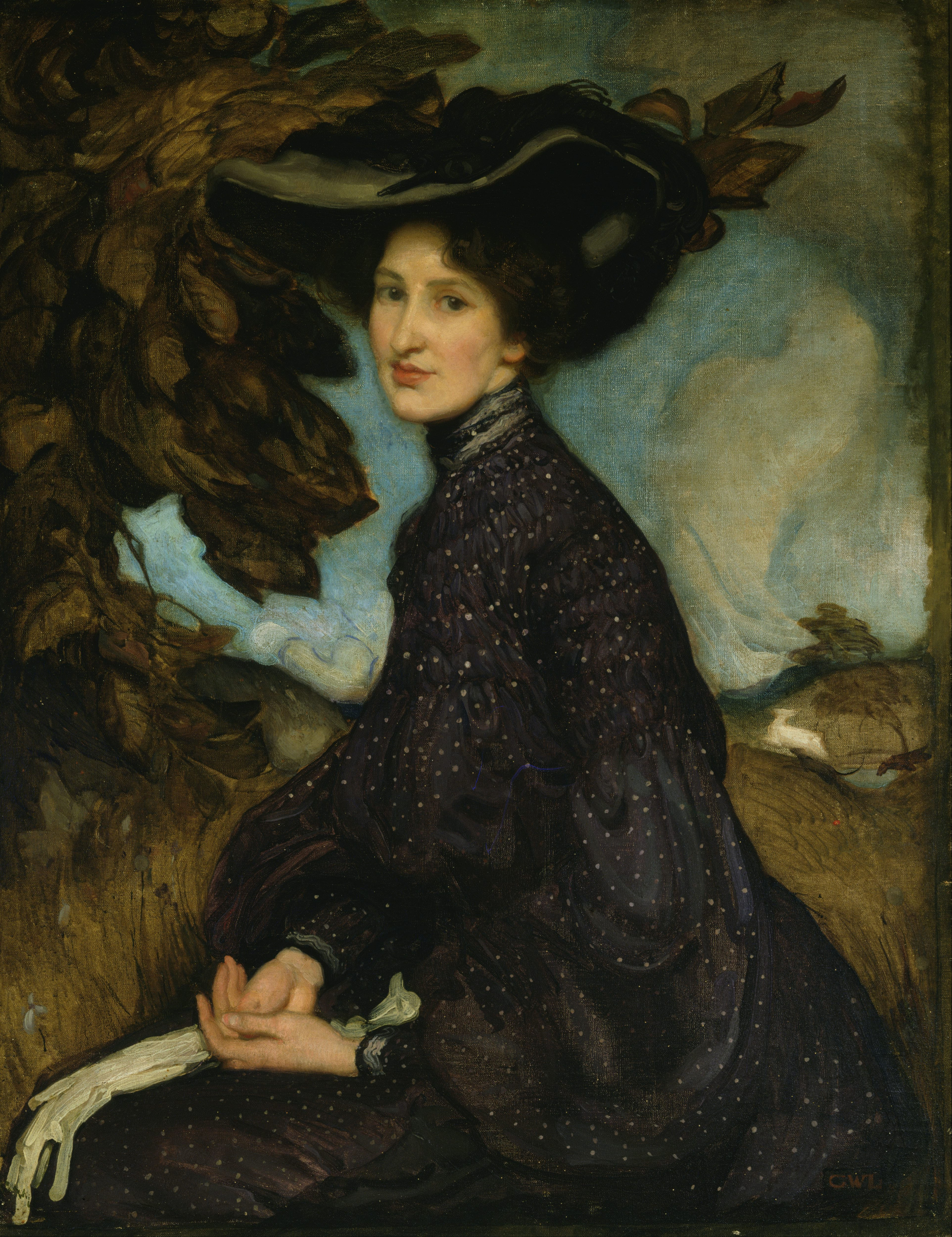
Thea Proctor by George W Lambert

Proctor was born in Armidale, New South Wales, to William Consett Proctor who was a solicitor and a politician and Kathleen Jane Louisa Proctor (née Roberts). When her parents separated in 1892, she and her mother moved to Bowral to stay with her grandmother who encouraged her interest in painting.

Proctor studied at the Sydney Art School from 1896 under Julian Ashton, then at the St John's Wood School of Art in London in 1903. Ashton and Lambert became lifelong friends and she modelled for him many times. Apart from two years spent in Sydney between 1912 and 1914 she worked in London from 1903 to 1921, associating with fellow Australian expatriates Charles Conder, Arthur Streeton and Tom Roberts. She produced pencil drawings, decorative watercolours and fans influenced by Conder and Japanese woodblock prints. She exhibited at the Royal Academy of Arts and the New English Art Club, later producing lithographs which were exhibited at the Senefelder Club and at the London Goupil Gallery for the International Society of Sculptors, Painters and Gravers. In 1908 she was awarded the joint first award (value £50), with Frances Hodgkins, in a Franco-British exhibition in London to mark the fourth anniversary of the Entente Cordiale agreement. Proctor was also inspired by a performance of the Ballets Russes which she saw in 1911. She found it 'beautiful and inspired'. Her decorative work was inspired by Chelsea Arts Club balls with their elaborate costumes and beautiful fabrics.

In 1912, Proctor became the first female Australian artist to exhibit at the Venice Biennale. Her watercolour on silk 'Coquetterie', with its characteristic depiction of costuming, was exhibited for Great Britain.

After returning to Sydney, Proctor exhibited with Margaret Preston in 1925 then with George Lambert and the Contemporary Group who exhibited in Adrian Feint's Grosvenor Gallery in George Street from 1926 to 1928 with Grace Cossington Smith, Marion Hall Best, Elioth Gruner, Margaret Preston, Roland Wakelin and Roy de Maistre. She and Preston were friends who exhibited together in Sydney and Melbourne until a precipitous bout of professional jealousy in 1925.

Proctor was known for her interest in fashion, and designed her own clothing, expressing her individuality. On her return from London in the early 1920s, Proctor's opinions of Australian women's fashion were quoted. She derided the poor availability of the sort of luxury fabrics she had been used to seeing in London and Paris, and particularly the way Australian women wore what she considered shapeless hats.

By 1922, she had set up a studio in the Grosvenor Building at 219 George Street where she taught classes. She regarded herself as one of the first 'moderns' to exhibit in Australia, regularly attending art openings, always impeccably dressed in lavender or violet.

Proctor taught Adrian Feint the techniques of woodblock-engraving 1926–28, and they both produced covers for the Ure Smith magazine The Home. Later she taught linocut printing at Julian Ashton's Sydney Art School and drawing at the Society of Arts and Crafts of New South Wales.

In 1937 Proctor became a foundation member of, and exhibited with, Robert Menzies' anti-modernist organisation, the Australian Academy of Art. Late in life she promoted the neglected work of her cousin John Russell. Proctor remained unmarried but was briefly engaged to Sidney Long in 1898, whom she had met and studied with in London. Proctor was always exquisitely groomed and considered beautiful. She was still creating and exhibiting drawings of sure and subtle draughtsmanship until late in life, with her work showing at the Macquarie Galleries in Sydney.

== Death and legacy ==
Proctor died in the Sydney suburb of Potts Point on 29 July 1966. Her cousin was Emmie Russell who was an orthoptist and she gained a large collection of paintings by Proctor and her uncle John Peter Russell. She had a large collection of art that she donated to Australian galleries.

Two of several portraits by Lambert of Proctor hang in the Art Gallery of New South Wales and the National Portrait Gallery in Australia has a portrait in charcoal, also by Lambert.

== Oral history ==
Proctor was interviewed in 1961 by Hazel de Berg about her life and artworks. The recording can be found at the National Library of Australia.

== Recognition ==
- Awarded a prize at the Bowral Amateur Art Society's exhibition in 1894, while attending Lynthorpe Ladies' College. This was judged by Arthur Streeton.
- The Society of Artists awarded her a medal in recognition of her influence as a tastemaker in New South Wales.
- A retrospective exhibition The World of Thea Proctor was held at the National Portrait Gallery, Old Parliament House in 2005.
- Proctor Street in the Canberra suburb of Chisholm is named in her honour.

== Sources ==
- Encyclopedia of Australian Art Alan McCulloch, Hutchinson, London 1968
- The World of Thea Proctor Barry Humphries, Andrew Sayers, Sarah Engledow, Craftsmann House, St Leonards, NSW, 2005
