= Eleanor Rae =

Eleanor Rae (born 1934) is an American author and proponent of ecofeminism.

== Early life and education ==
Rae was born in Meriden, Connecticut on January 31, 1934. Eleanor was the youngest of four children, her parents Stella Sandj and Jon Pracon immigrated to the United States from Poland. Her parents named here after First Lady Eleanor Roosevelt with the thought that her family would survive the Great Depression. Eleanor Rae is married to Giles Rae and they together have two daughters, a son, and eight grandchildren.

Rae first earned a Mathematics degree from the College of New Rochelle. She received a master's degree from Southern Connecticut State University in early childhood education and a Masters in parish ministry and adult education from Fordham University. Rae earned her doctoral degree from Fordham in contemporary systematic theology.

== Career ==
After her youngest child entered school, Rae worked as a day care worker, parent cooperative nursery school director, in church ministries, and a public school teacher. In her most recent position as Director of Office of the Laity for the Roman Catholic Diocese of Bridgeport CT, she developed an interest in women's issues and the environment. After seventeen years her controversial and abrupt dismissal from the Diocese led to her founding of the Centre for Women, the Earth, the Divine (CWED). Eleanor also became increasingly involved in The North American Coalition for Christianity and Ecology (NACCE), one of the early organizations in the United States founded to motivate Christians toward ecological action, where she was elected president and served as such for several terms.

Rae is considered a staple in ecofeminist theology. She has had a focus on women's oppression and issues around this subject her entire career. Rae is part of a group of ecofeminists that contribute to social in justice and attacks philosophical theories that contribute to injustices. Ecofeminism as a whole aims to connect, historically and philosophically, the idea of women's oppression and nature's exploitation. 'Rae is credited as one of these eco feminists.

Rae has worked with Amazon river dolphins in Peru and leatherback turtles in Suriname.

== Major works ==
Rae co-authored the book Created in Her Image: Models of the Feminine Divine. Beginning in 1995, Rae has published a quarterly newsletter Weaving the Connections on various women's issues.

=== Created in Her Image: Models of the Feminine Divine ===
Eleanor Rae uses her feminist perspective, spirituality, and her social concerns to put forth a book that explains the powers of the feminist divine. The book outlines the role that psychology has played in feminism and how it will also play a role going forward.

=== Women, the Earth, the Divine ===
Rae puts together three topics of concern in this 1994 novel. The novel focuses on rediscovering feminine principle that is a not a result of male view. Instead, Rae uses real world experiences from women. She ties together ecofeminism with religion and relates them to real world issues. The novel examines western tendencies to ignore women's voices and peoples ability to overlook women's capabilities across various subjects. Rae compares the feminine principle with four major religions, Islam, Buddhism, Hinduism, and Judaism.

== Awards and honors ==
Rae was awarded the Ursula Lauris citation for her leadership achievements.
