= Lou Rae =

Australian historian

Lou Rae is a Tasmanian author and historian of the West Coast of Tasmania.

His publications have included articles about Rosebery, Tasmania, the Emu Bay Railway Queenstown, Tasmania and the Mount Lyell Railway otherwise known as the Abt Railway, as well as the Sandfly Colliery Tramway.

His publications about railways on the west coast of Tasmania have gone into multiple editions, as well as modifying for the changes in the fate of the railways.

He also has been a postgraduate student at the University of Tasmania, culminating in his 2005 PhD thesis about the Mount Lyell area.

His session at The Unconformity event in Queenstown in October 2016 addresses the issues of sources and historiography of the Western Tasmanian region.

== Publications ==
- Rae, Lou (1984), A history of railways and tramways on Tasmania's West Coast (4th ed.), L. Rae (published 1986), ISBN 978-0-9592098-0-8
- Rae, Lou (1988), The ABT Railway : on Tasmania's West Coast, L. Rae, ISBN 978-0-9592098-1-5
- Rae, Lou. An introduction to the Sandfly colliery tramway; Whitham, Lindsay. The Sandfly Coal Mine and tramway; Chynoweth, R. Wayne. The locomotives of the Sandfly and Catamaran tramways; Light Railway Research Society of Australia (1988), Sandfly colliery tramway, Tasmania, Light Railway Research Society of Australia
- Rae, Lou (1991), The Emu Bay Railway : VDL Company to Pasminco, L. Rae, ISBN 978-0-9592098-2-2
- Rae, Lou (1993), The Mt Lyell Mining and Railway Co. Ltd : a pictorial history 1893-1993, L. Rae, ISBN 978-0-9592098-3-9
- Rae, Lou (1994), The Abt Railway, and railways of the Lyell region, L. Rae, ISBN 978-0-9592098-5-3
- Rae, Lou (1994), A window on Rosebery : a pictorial review of the 100 years in and around the environs of Rosebery on Tasmania's rugged West Coast, 1893-1993, L. Rae, ISBN 978-0-9592098-4-6
- Rae, Lou (1997), The Emu Bay Railway (2nd ed.), L. Rae, ISBN 978-0-9592098-6-0
- Rae, Lou (2003), The Abt Railway : Tasmania's West Coast Wilderness Railway, Lou Rae, ISBN 978-0-9592098-8-4
- Rae, Louis Gould (2005), The lost province : exploration, isolation, innovation and domination in the Mount Lyell Region, 1859-1935
