= Ann Cuthbert Rae =

Canadian writer and educator

Ann Cuthbert Rae (1788 – March 15, 1860) was a Scottish-born Canadian writer and educator. Her name also appears with the married surnames Fleming and Knight.

The daughter of John Rae and Margaret Cuthbert, she was born near Aberdeen in a middle-class family. Her brother was the economist John Rae. Rae visited Canada with her first husband in 1810. She published two books of poetry while still living in Scotland: Home in 1815 and A year in Canada, and other poems which appeared in 1816. In June 1815, she moved with her husband to Montreal. She opened a school for girls there and, following her husband's death in June 1816, continued to operate a boarding school for four years. During the 1830s, she returned to teaching and developed several school textbooks including First book for Canadian children; Views of Canadian scenery, for Canadian children and The prompter; and Progressive exercises on the English language, to correspond with "The prompter". These were among the first textbooks to incorporate Canadian content. She was supported in her efforts by archdeacon John Strachan and governor Sir Charles Metcalfe. In 1843, she travelled to Hamilton and Kingston in Upper Canada to teach English grammar and promote her teaching methods to educators there.

She was married twice: first to James Innes Knight, a merchant, in 1810 and then to James Fleming, also a merchant, in 1820.

Rae died in Abbotsford in Canada East.
