= Alex Rae (rugby union) =

English rugby union player

- Born: 2 February 1986 (age 40) Coventry, England
- Height: 6 ft 5 in (1.96 m)
- Weight: 229 lb (104 kg; 16.4 st)

Rugby union career
- Position: Lock
Senior career
Years	Team	Apps	(Points)
2005–2009	Northampton Saints	12	(0)
2009–2013	Bedford Blues		
2012-13	→Saracens		
2012-13	→London Wasps		
2013–17	Jersey Reds		
2017-	Bedford Blues		

Alexander Rae born 2 February 1986 in Coventry, England is a rugby union head coach for Coventry. He previously played for the Northampton Saints, Saracens, London Wasps and Bedford Blues.

== Personal life ==
Rae was educated at Coundon Court in Coventry.

== Club career ==
Rae started his rugby career playing at Northampton Saints after coming up through their academy. He made his debut in 2005. He signed a full-time contract with them in 2007, however he only made 12 appearances with 2 starts while at Northampton Saints. In 2009, he was loaned out to Nottingham R.F.C. and later in the year moved to Bedford Blues and was named as the vice-captain in the 2011–12 season, being named as captain when James Pritchard was playing at the 2011 Rugby World Cup. In 2012 he played for Saracens F.C. on dual registration with Bedford Blues. In 2013 he was loaned to English Premiership side London Wasps so that Rae could play top flight rugby. London Wasps also paid compensation to Bedford Blues for the loan. In August 2013, Rae left Bedford Blues and moved to Jersey R.F.C.. Upon signing, he was given the captaincy of Jersey for the 2013-14 RFU Championship season. In May 2014, it was announced that Jersey had retained Rae for the 2014-15 RFU Championship season.

== International career ==
Rae has played for the England national rugby sevens team. He has also represented the England national under-18 rugby union team, the England national under-19 rugby union team and the England national under-20 rugby union team.
