= Frederick James Rae =

Australian botanist and director of botanical gardens

Frederick James Rae (c. 1883 – 18 September 1941) was director of Melbourne Botanic Gardens and Victorian Government Botanist 1926–1941.

== History ==
Rae was born in Blackwood, Victoria, son of James Rae, of Yea.

He enlisted with the First AIF in May 1915 and served in the 1914–1918 war, first with the 10th Battery, Field Artillery, in Egypt and France, and later as an observer with No. 3 Squadron of the Australian Flying Corps. He suffered from recurrent tonsilitis, influenza, and gastric ulcer, and was invalided home with the rank of lieutenant in 1918.

He graduated Bachelor of Arts, Bachelor of Science, and Bachelor of Agricultural Science from Melbourne University.

He was appointed lecturer at the Burnley School of Agriculture and Horticulture, then in 1921 was appointed principal, following the death of J. P. McLennan.

He was appointed director of the Botanic Gardens following the death on 22 September 1925 of William Laidlaw.

He was also known for his interest in the Albert Park Reserve, and was chairman of the Albert Park Committee of Management.

He was one of the judges of The Herald garden competitions from their inception in 1923.
