= Eryldene, Gordon =

Historic building in Sydney, Australia

Eryldene
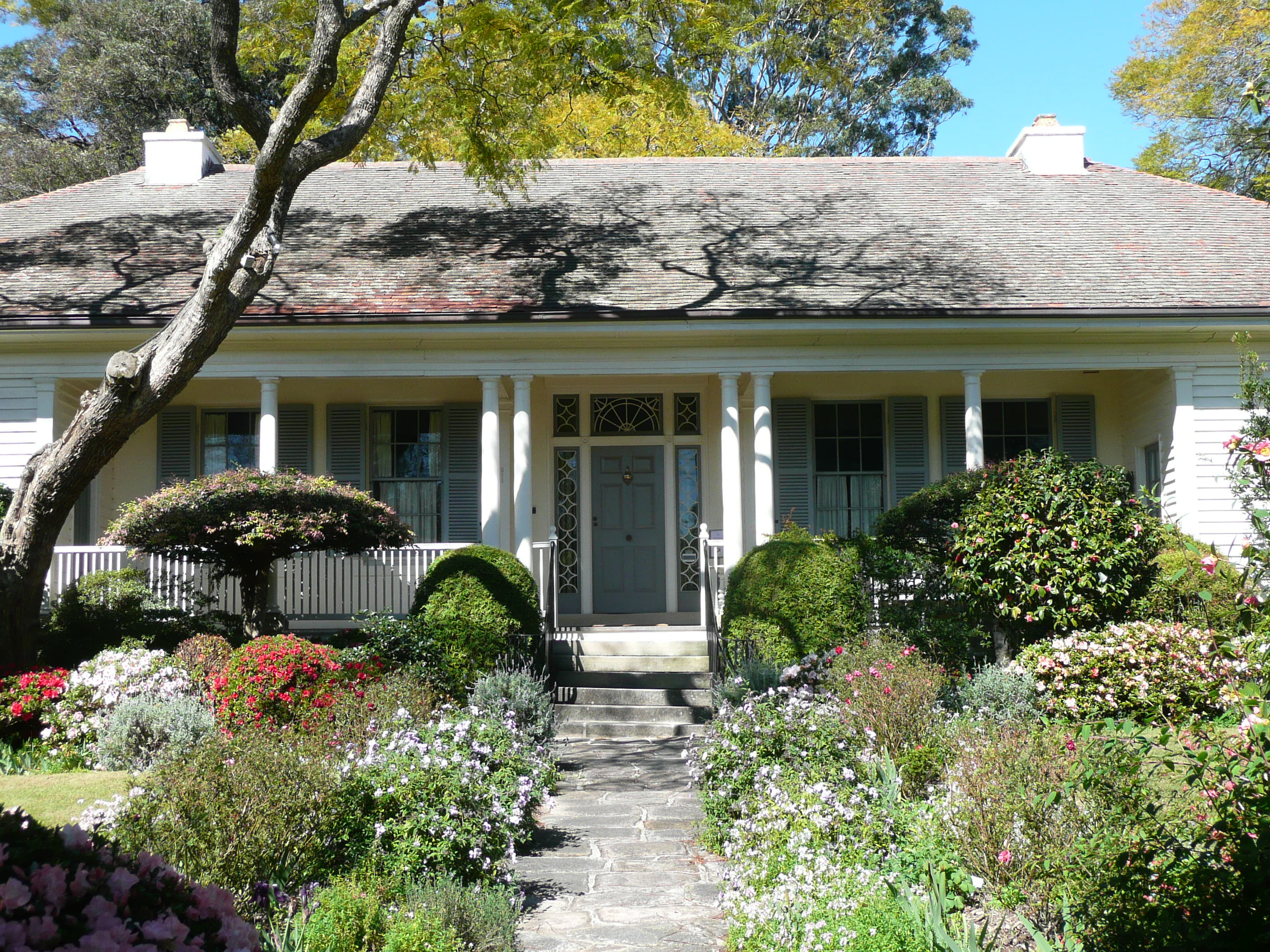

- Location within Sydney
- 33°45′29″S 151°09′27″E
- Location: 17 McIntosh Street, Gordon, New South Wales, Australia

History
- Built: 1913–1936
- Built for: Eben Gowrie Waterhouse & Janet Waterhouse

Site notes
- Architect: William Hardy Wilson
- Architectural style: Georgian Revival
- Owner: The Eryldene Trust
- Website: www.eryldene.org.au

New South Wales Heritage Register
- Official name: Eryldene
- Type: State heritage (complex / group)
- Designated: 2 April 1999
- Reference no.: 19
- Type: House
- Category: Residential buildings (private)
- Builders: Rudolph G. Ochs

Eryldene is a heritage-listed former family residence and now house museum located at 17 McIntosh Street in the suburb of Gordon, on the Upper North Shore region of Sydney, New South Wales, Australia. It was designed by William Hardy Wilson and built from 1913 to 1936 by Rudolph G. Ochs. The property is owned by The Eryldene Trust. The house and its garden, which is noted for its camellias was added to the New South Wales State Heritage Register on 2 April 1999 and was listed on the Australian Register of the National Estate.

== History ==
The real spirit of the 20th century came to Australian architecture with the domestic work of a quartet of practitioners after the World War I. Between them, they encompassed all the virtues and the vices, the strengths and the weaknesses which have marked the last 50 years. The only thing they had in common was a conviction that architectural thinking had to start at a more basic level than anything that had been known for a hundred years.

The group of thinking-architects responsible for ushering in the 20th century were Hardy Wilson, Robin Dods, Harold Desbrowe-Annear and Walter Burley Griffin. They worked in different places and they worked individually. But between them, they covered most of the ideas and attitudes that followed. Because, with the exception of Griffin, they worked almost exclusively on houses, their effect was strongest on domestic work. The same depth of thought and changes which they brought to homes did not begin to percolate into other types of building, which merely acquired from them the vices of individualism to compound their blatant stylism, for another 40 years.

=== William Hardy Wilson ===
William (later Hardy) Wilson had been born in Sydney in 1881. His search for architectural truth, a deep love and appreciation of beauty, an interest in history and an abiding faith in the concept of the artist-architect led him to strive for the pre-Victorian virtues. But his was not mere copyism. Sensitive to the underlying qualities of colonial architecture, he sought to apply their timeless principles to his own work.

In 1905 Wilson went to England and enrolled in the Architectural Association School of Architecture in London and also worked as a draftsman for William Flockhart in Bond Street. The chief draftsman in that office, Leonard Rothrie, introduced him to the Chelsea Art Club, where he met English sculptor Francis Derwent Ward and Scottish painter George Henry, as well as Australian artists including Tom Roberts, Arthur Streeton and George Lambert.

In 1908 Wilson and Stacy Neave (another architect from Sydney) commenced their grand tour of Europe and North America, where they found the work of McKim, Mead & White and the American Colonial Revival style particularly impressive. It was during this tour that Wilson realised the influence of geography was crucial to the development of art and architecture.

In 1911 Wilson changed his name legally to William Hardy Wilson and joined Neave to form Wilson & Neave. When Neave served in World War 1, Wilson closed the practice and concentrated on writing and completing his drawings of old colonial architecture in NSW and Tasmania and building his own house, Purulia (completed 1916).

The positioning of the summer house at Purulia, on the cross-axis of the central path and diagonally to the right of the front door, is similar to the positioning of the more sophisticated one at Eryldene. The simple stone-flagged central path is common to all the gardens, yet it is a cottage detail, not found in the old colonial gardens of the County of Cumberland which Wilson knew.

Another notable Wilson designed house of this era was Macquarie Cottage, Pymble (1919) for H. Dunstan Vane.

In 1920 Wilson & Neave took on John Berry as partner, becoming Wilson, Neave & Berry (1920–27), a firm noted for the Colonial Revival style of architecture for domestic design: fat, low-squatting Georgian boxes with colonnaded verandahs, spider-web fanlights on entrance doors and multi-paned windows with shutters. The firm's style followed the Colonial Revival based on the United States idiom, but also looked to Australian colonial architecture for inspiration. This style became very popular in the 1920s.

In 1921 Wilson went to China and took lessons in Chinese painting under Kungpah King (Jin Chen); his travels to China's major cities, Peking (Beijing), Hangzhou, Shanghai, Canton (Guangshou) and Macao had a profound influence in his architectural philosophy and design. After Wilson's visit to China in 1921, the firm incorporated Oriental motifs and details, examples of which are found at Eryldene, Gordon (1914–36) and Peapes Department Store, Sydney (1923). In 1922 Wilson sold Purulia and travelled to England and Europe, where, in Vienna, he supervised the collotype reproductions for "Colonial architecture in NSW and Tasmania" (1924), his publication that would foster great interest in an Australian Colonial Revival. In 1925 Wilson returned to Sydney, where he became disillusioned with the state of Australian architecture and began writing his view sand ideas in a fictionalised biography "The dawn of a new civilisation" (1929) under a pseudonym of Richard Le Mesurer. In 1927 he completed his last design – the tennis pavilion (later called the Tea House) at Eryldene in Gordon for Prof. E.G. and Janet Waterhouse – the epitome of "a new style in architecture, the development in one style of Chinese and European classic", retired from practice and left for England.

=== Eben Gowrie Waterhouse and Janet Waterhouse ===
Eryldene was built in 1913–1914 for Professor Eben Gowrie Waterhouse CMG (1881–1977) (commonly known as E. G. Waterhouse) and Mrs Janet Waterhouse and named after the house in Kilmarnock, Scotland where they married. Designed by William Hardy Wilson, it reflects his interest in the Georgian Revival style of architecture, adapted for Australian conditions. Professor Waterhouse also had a distinct influence upon the design of the house and is responsible for the simple hipped roof now apparent, rather than the gables often favoured by Wilson.

E. G. Waterhouse was a linguist and from 1924 Professor of German at University of Sydney, as well as being an avid gardener at his home, Eryldene and (later) a leading world authority on camellias. Eryldene's garden was increasingly a collection of camellias, many that he'd collected in Japan and China and all individually labelled, bilingually.

The garden was designed by both Wilson and Waterhouse. Conceived as an extension of the house with particular "rooms", it was to become an expression of Waterhouse's individual character. It is now well known for its introduction of camellias back into the twentieth-century garden.

In seeking out and drawing the buildings for his "Old Colonial Architecture in New South Wales and Tasmania", Hardy Wilson became aware of the siting and gardens of early colonial houses. He was the first to recognise and appreciate a characteristic mid-19th-century style of gardening in New South Wales. For nearly 50 years his was the only voice stressing its importance and his descriptions – as vivid and full blown as the late summer gardens he visited – are still the most evocative. Wilson looked at these gardens with a painter's eye, not the analytical eye of a designer. He was neither botanist nor horticulturist. He appreciated their siting, colour and texture rather than their layout and details.

Of large forest trees he admired only the picturesque angophora (A.floribunda or A.subvelutina), the "apple oak" of the colonists; and, presumably the turpentines (Syncarpia glomulifera) which he planted along the rear boundaries of Purulia. He designed five gardens: Eryldene (Gordon), Purulia, Macquarie Cottage (Pymble), a garden for "An Ideal Australian Home" and for a "Standard Cottage" for the William Moore Trust at Gordon. The latter were not carried out. Purulia and Macquarie Cottage have been altered. Eryldene presents a problem as in its final form it displays so much the taste and horticultural expertise of its owner, Professor Waterhouse, that Wilson's contribution is difficult to assess, and since it predates the other gardens, the influence of "Professor Pymble" on these should be considered. The similarities between all Wilson's garden plans are marked.

From his love and knowledge of colonial gardens came his choice of plants. The range is limited, but it contrasts with the ubiquitous palms, brush box and hybrid roses of contemporary gardens as stringkingly as his unbroken colour-washed walls contrasted with the redness of his neighbours' "multangular villas".

Waterhouse managed to acquire twelve advanced Camellia japonica cultivar (cv.) plants 1–1 metre (3–4 ft) high in 1914 and planted six in the garden at Eryldene: two at the front gate, two in front of the garden temple, and two in the courtyard; and gave six to Hardy Wilson. This is mentioned in the book "E G Waterhouse of Eryldene" by Mary Armati reprinted by the Eryldene Trust 2004, p37 which says:

'...he did not share the prevailing attitude towards camellias. Although they were completely out of fashion and difficult to obtain, he was greatly taken by their beauty and dignity. In 1914 he managed to acquire twelve advanced plants, 3 to 4 feet high, kept six for the garden he was planning and building at Eryldene and gave the remaining six to Hardy Wilson. He was already on the camellia trail.'

This quote was read and approved by him before his death in 1977.

In the early 1920s he was asked by the vice chancellor of Sydney University, Professor McCallum, to lay out a garden in the Vice Chancellor's courtyard. Here he planted a number of twenty-year-old azaleas, some fuchsias and some camellias.

The camellia had been the subject of a "rage" in gardening and botanical circles between its first "discovery" and export to the west. By the 1870s Australia was at the cutting edge of Camellia hybridisation and cultivar naming, along with England, Antwerp/Belgian and Florence/Italian breeding. By the 1890s camellias were waning in popularity, starting a slide lasting till the 1930s. Waterhouse's interest from 1914 was well before 1937, when English writer Sacheverell Sitwell's book Old Fashioned Flowers included camellias, leading to a revival in growing them.

The genus "Camellia" was named (i.e., published) by the great Carl Linne (Linnaeus) in 1735, in his Systema Naturae, for a plant described in (surgeon to the Dutch East India Company, Engelbert) Kaempfer's Amoenitatum Exoticarum 1712. More species have been "discovered", exported and named since as investigation has continued in China, Japan, Burma and Indo-China. Vietnam is yielding more species, including purple-flowered, in recent years. The name was in honour of Jesuit apothecary and naturalist from Moravia (now Czech Republic) Georg Josef Kamel, who worked in the Philippines in the early 18th century.

The most important species are C. japonica and C. sasanqua (first "discovered" in Japan but the former also native to Korea, and both long cultivated in China) and C. reticulata from China. Species used recently in inter-specific hybridising which have produced some excellent cultivars are C. saluenensis, C. pitardii var. yunnanica, C. granthamiana and C. fraterna.

In 1921 a garden retreat was built for the Professor's use. The curved wall and fountain in sandstone outside (east of) the garden retreat/ study was designed by Hardy Wilson and built in 1921. The glass-fronted bookcases inside were designed by Wilson's partner, John L. Berry. In 1924, after a trip to China, the professor commissioned the design and construction of a tea house and "Moon Gate" as an adjunct to the tennis court.

After the Second World War, Waterhouse retired as Professor of French and German at Sydney University, and began Camellia Grove Nursery at St. Ives. This was Camellia Grove No.4 in Australian garden history. The first was begun by Robert Henderson who died in 1865 and was located in Newtown. The second was Alexander Hunter's Camellia Grove (1870) at Liverpool Road, Ashfield and the third was at Parramatta (in the suburb now called Camellia, established by Silas Sheather before 1877. Sheather had been employed by the Macarthurs and was influenced by his experience with the Camden Park seedlings. At his Parramatta nursery he grew and offered for sale in 1877 imported cultivars and some of his own seedlings which included "Harriet Beeecher Sheather", "Myrtifolia", "Prince Frederick William" and the informal "Countess of Orkney", all included in his catalogue and represented at Eryldene. Earlier in 1862 Shepherd and Co. listed C. j.'Azura' , "Leviathan" and C. speciosissima, all of which the Professor tracked down. Alexander Hunter had served an apprenticeship as a nurseryman with Shepherd and Co. at their Chatsworth nursery at Rooty Hill and his introductions include "Constance", "Jean Lynne", "Edith Linton", "Ruth Kemp", "Mrs Swan", 'Brodie's Pink' and "Alexander Hunter". "Mrs Swan" was lost from Eryldene after the Professor's death when a plumber cut through its root zone to install a stormwater drain. Hunter sold or left Mr. G.C. Linton a property called Kewita at Somersby.

Waterhouse gave the camellia world his new hybrid seedlings known as the "Waterhouse williamsii" hybrids. "Margaret Waterhouse", named for his daughter in law, replaced the former name "E.G.Waterhouse". Camellia Grove Nursery is now at 8 Cattai Ridge Road, Glenorie.

Waterhouse's collection of camellias is a living history museum that represents the introduction and development of the camellia. In 1945 Waterhouse's first volume on camellias "Camellia Trail", later to be followed by a second, "Camellia Quest" was published in a strictly limited edition by Sydney Ure Smith. Each copy was signed by the Professor and participating artists Adrian Feint and Paul Jones. These books are now collector's items. His story of the camellia in Australia included Alexander Macleay of Elizabeth Bay House (from the 1830s) and the Macarthurs of Camden Park, particularly William (also from the 1830s), propagating by layering and distributing imported varieties to nurserymen and private growers in NSW, Tasmania, Victoria and South Australia. William Macarthur raised and named 67 seedlings at Camden Park and a number of these were distributed. He notes the role of nurseryman Michael Guilfoyle of the "Exotic Nursery" in Double Bay, whose 1866 catalogue listed 95 varieties of camellia, all grafted. Macleay and Macarthur both encouraged Sydney's first nurseryman, Thomas Shepherd, whose Darling Nursery company's 1851 catalogue listed 33 camellias. All were C. japonica cv.s except for one C. sasanqua (autumn camellia).

Because few nurseries bothered to grow camellias from 1900 onwards Waterhouse often resorted to rescuing them from demolition sites. The first six were brought to Eryldene by means of a dray. "Aspasia" (a Macarthur variety) and "Great Eastern", a seedling of unknown origin, but still popular today, were among the first he acquired.

In 1950 Waterhouse with Sydney nurseryman Walter Hazlewood, Alex Jessup (former Director, Royal Botanic Gardens, Melbourne) and Dr Merrilees, founded the Australian Camellia Research Society. This has a worldwide membership of 1500 and in partnership with Sutherland Shire Council and the Sutherland Orchid Society was responsible for establishment of the E. G. Waterhouse National Camellia Gardens as a Bicentennial project in 1970 with Sutherland Shire Council.

Since the World War II the genus Camellia has enjoyed an unprecedented revival due in no small measure to the untiring efforts of the late Professor, both in Australia and in every country suited to its cultivation. Waterhouse died aged 96 on August 17, 1977, by which time over 700 camellia varieties had been accommodated in Eryldene's garden, which had completely changed in character from its original cottage garden semi-formal layout.

After the Professor's death, ownership eventually reverted to the Eryldene Trust in 1979. Conservation work was undertaken between 1982 and 1983 and provisions were made to accommodate a resident custodian. The house is now open to the public (since 1991) as an exhibition space and open garden.

In seeking out and drawing the buildings for his "Old Colonial Architecture in New South Wales and Tasmania", Hardy Wilson became aware of the siting and gardens of early colonial houses. He was the first to recognise and appreciate a characteristic mid-19th-century style of gardening in New South Wales. For nearly 50 years his was the only voice stressing its importance and his descriptions – as vivid and full blown as the late summer gardens he visited – are still the most evocative. Wilson looked at these gardens with a painter's eye, not the analytical eye of a designer. He was neither botanist nor horticulturist. He appreciated their siting, colour and texture rather than their layout and details.

Of large forest trees, he admired only the picturesque angophora (A.floribunda or A.subvelutina), the "apple oak" of the colonists...; and, presumably the turpentines (Syncarpia glomulifera) which he planted along the rear boundaries of Purulia. He designed 5 gardens: Eryldene (Gordon), Purulia, Macquarie Cottage (Pymble), a garden for "An Ideal Australian Home" and for a "Standard Cottage" for the William Moore Trust at Gordon. The latter were not carried out. Purulia and Macquarie Cottage have been altered. Eryldene presents a problem as in its final form it displays so much the taste and horticultural expertise of its owner, Professor Waterhouse, that Wilson's contribution is difficult to assess, and since it predates the other gardens, the influence of "Professor Pymble" on these should be considered. The similarities between all Wilson's garden plans are marked.

From his love and knowledge of colonial gardens came his choice of plants. The range is limited, but it contrasts with the ubiquitous palms, brush box and hybrid roses of contemporary gardens as strikingly as his unbroken colour-washed walls contrasted with the redness of his neighbours' "multangular villas".

Wilson planned his gardens with layouts of an easy, but nevertheless rigorously applied formal geometry, which owes little to colonial or contemporary English garden design (to which Wilson makes no reference in any of his writings). They are unmistakably gardens designed by an architect who, though admiring the architectural work of Lutyens, probably knew little of current English gardens.

The positioning of the summer house at Purulia, on the cross-axis of the central path and diagonally to the right of the front door, is similar to the positioning of the more sophisticated one at Eryldene. The simple stone-flagged central path is common to all the gardens, yet it is a cottage detail, not found in the old colonial gardens of the County of Cumberland which Wilson knew.

== Description ==
=== Garden ===
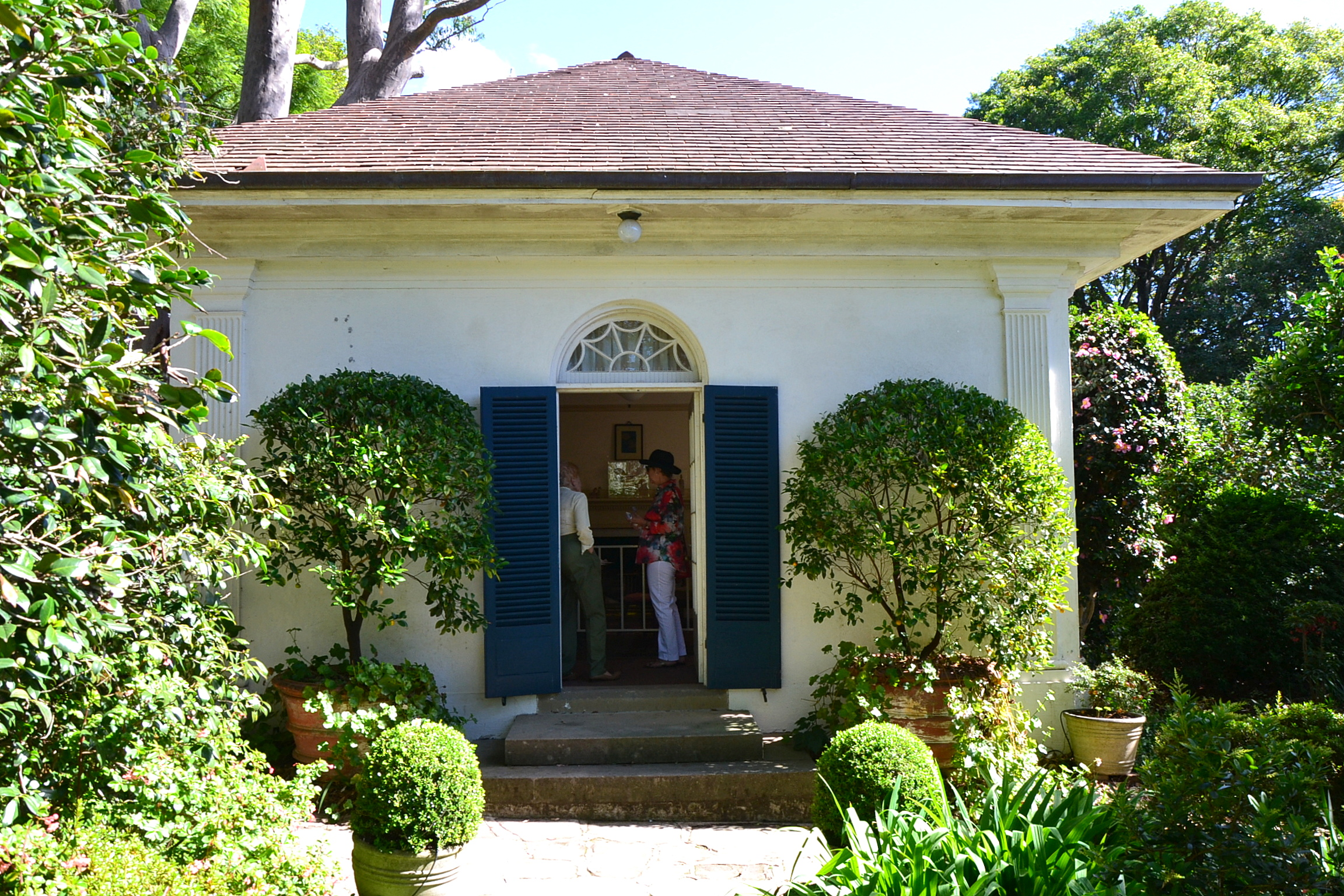
Garden study

The house was designed to link with its formal garden setting, which was laid out by Wilson and Professor Waterhouse and is testimony to their shared interest in the Orient. There are garden structures designed by Wilson and others including a temple in the front garden (Wilson 1913); garden study, fountain and pigeon house (Wilson and his partner John L Berry 1921–22), garden shed (Berry 1924), tea house (Wilson 1927) and garage and moon gate (1936). The garden is geometrically, but not formally planned. A wooden picket fence and tightly clipped hedge, screen the garden from the street. An irregularly flagged path, edged by garden beds, leads to the stone front steps, flanked with iron railings.

The entrance path separates the front garden into two lawned areas. On the left stands an open octagonal summerhouse of slim mid 19th century cast iron columns, supporting a pitched roof with terracotta shingles. In the same position at the rear of the house stands a pigeon house, a garden study and a fountain.

To the right at the front is a lawn area, garden seat and whitewashed terracotta pots with large camellias and azaleas in it, the driveway at the western side to a single garage behind the house. To the right at the rear is an area of shrubbery, and a lawn tennis court entered through a moon gate set in the wire netting fence, and a Chinese tea house / Tennis Pavilion set between a pair of ornamental flag poles on the south-western boundary. Chinese ornaments and bowls are found throughout the garden.

Large trees include a jacaranda at the front of the house on the left hand side, carefully pruned to accentuate the shadow effects of its branch tracery on the house's walls and large Sydney red gums (Angophora costata) at the rear. An original line of Lombardy poplars along the front fence has since been removed and replaced by African olive (Olea europaea var. Africana) hedging and native cypress pines (Callitris sp. – C. columellaris / C. rhomboidea) as vertical elements.

The garden has an impressive collection of ornamental camellias (C. japonica and C. sasanqua cultivars), gathered by Professor Waterhouse over some years as a passion. Waterhouse bred hybrids, and was a renowned expert on camellia classification and naming. Many of the camellia shrubs in the garden have their original name labels on them, some in Japanese/Chinese characters as well as English. An example is the Camellia japonica "Altheiflora" a blood-red small semi-double flowered cultivar, with ruffled petals.

Throughout the garden, careful use of axes, view manipulation, suggestion, surprise and architectural elements to "stop" views, or provide ornamental features along pathways have been carefully placed and maintained.

=== House ===
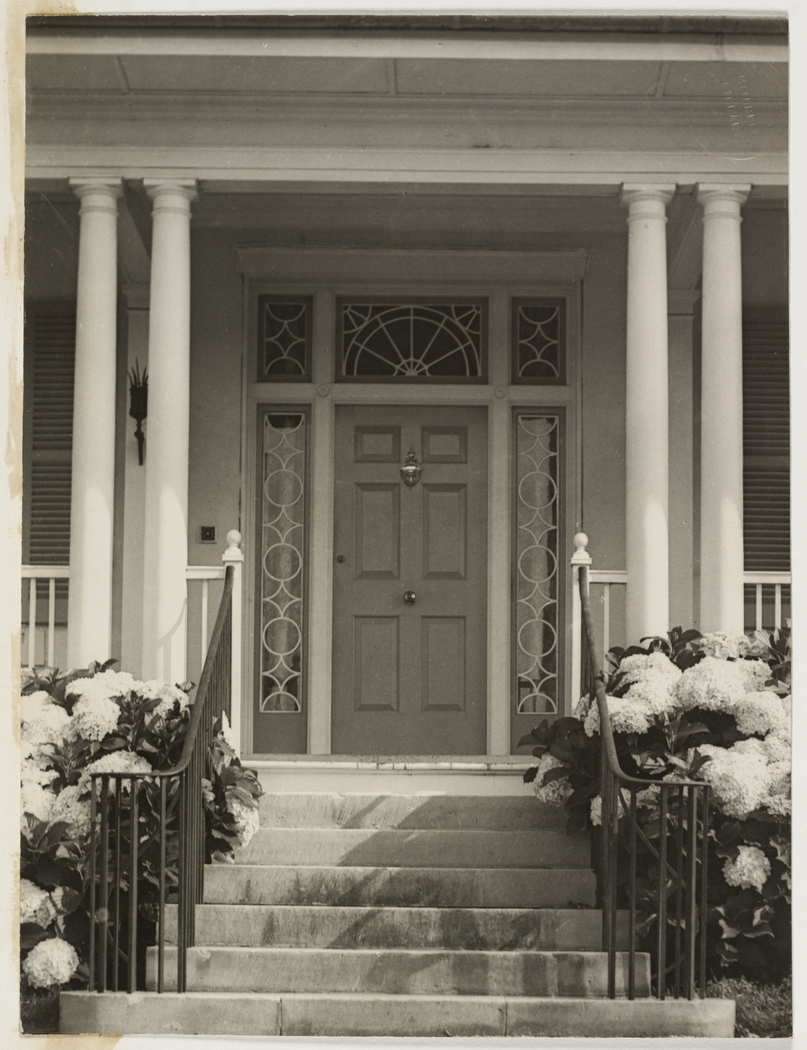
Early photograph of the entrance to Eryldene

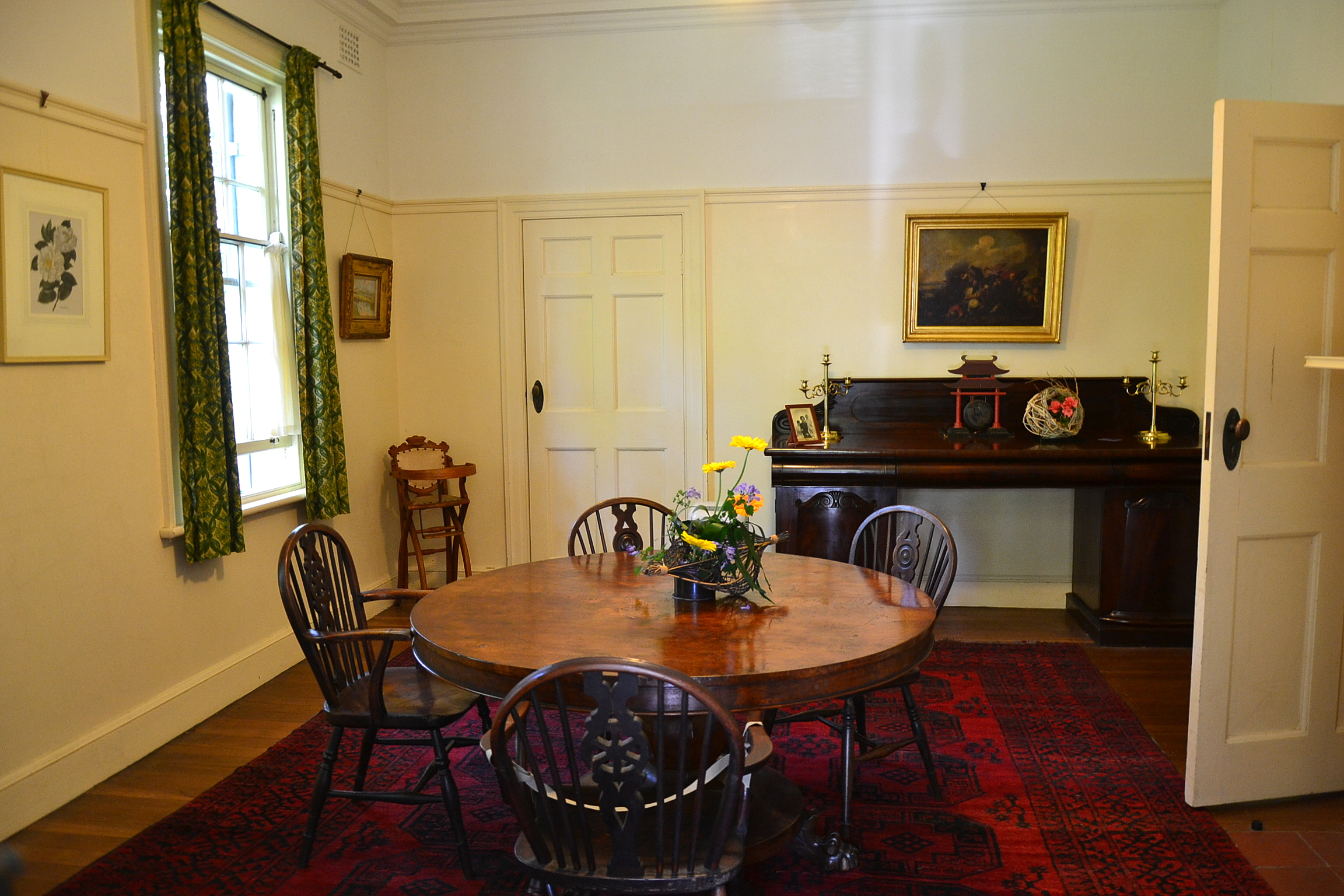
Interior

Eryldene is a single storey brick house. Its design is an adaption of Georgian Architecture to Australian conditions. A central path, edged by garden beds, leads to the stone front steps, flanked with iron railings. The verandah with its six beechwood columns and white railings consists of three well-proportioned areas, terminated at each end by a weatherboard sleep-out bedroom. The roof is of shingle tiles with generous eaves. At the rear is a courtyard with a colonnade of Doric iron columns.

Eryldene was built by Professor Eben Gowrie Waterhouse and his wife Janet. Professor Waterhouse was lecturer in modern languages and a renowned expert on camellias. It was the family home of entomologist Dr Doug Waterhouse CMG, AO (1916–2000). Eryldene was designed by William Hardy Wilson, Australia's leading advocate of the Old Colonial Georgian Revival movement, with major input from Prof. Waterhouse. It is a single storey cement rendered brick bungalow of conventional domestic construction with a hipped roof of terracotta roof shingle. Its symmetrical facade faces the formal garden frontage from which a central sandstone path and steps lead to an entrance verandah beneath the roof line. The verandah terminates at a loggia at each end and is broken up into five bays with wooden Doric columns placed at regular intervals, four of which are paired to mark the entrance at the centre. At the rear, the building wraps around a central courtyard framed by columns and open to the garden. Internally, a central hall separates two main rooms on either side. A hall at the rear echoes in plan the verandah and opens to the courtyard and the remaining rooms. The interior spaces are modest in scale and proportion. They are enriched by detailed elements inspired by colonial architecture researched by Wilson, including windows, doors and fanlights, architraves, skirtings, picture rails and mantelpieces.

=== Condition ===
Generally, the house and its contents are in good to excellent condition. The original furniture contents in the drawing room and dining room remain in situ. The original furniture and contents in the Garden Study remain in situ. The archaeological potential is negligible.

The house, gardens and outbuildings are significantly intact, with some room settings retaining their original furnishings and detail.

=== Modifications and dates ===
- 1913 – house and temple, designed by William Hardy Wilson; builder Rudolph Ochs
- 1921–22 – Garden Study, fountain and pigeon-house, des. Wm.Hardy Wilson (interior by John L Berry), garden shed, des. John L Berry
- 1924 – Tea house and Moon Gate
- 1927 – Tea House, des. Wm.Hardy Wilson, builder W A Farr
- 1936 – Garage, des. possibly Stacey A Neave, lattice screen (west of house), des. possibly R Keith Harris, Moon Gate (R Keith Harris)
- 1991 – change of use approved, for community purposes (House museum)
- 1993 – rotten front verandah floorboards repaired/patched, interior and exterior painting, including kitchen and laundry, bathroom, butler's pantry and ceiling of custodian's bedroom, bath enamel refinished, security system installed
- 1998 – refurbishment of 1921 garden study fountain, installation of a pump and water treatment apparatus, replaced front fence
- 2000 – repaired garden chair, plumbing pipes and fittings, water pipes outside kitchen replaced.
- 2001–02 – painting of chimneys, roof repairs above kitchen, repairs to watering system, broken sewer replaced
- 2002 – garden seat restored with funds from Australian Garden History Society. Original fruiting olive tree in front garden (west) on axis opposite the Garden Temple died. A sprout arose from its roots, off axis, and the decision was taken to retain this.
- 2003 – two ceilings restored in Garden Study, and front verandah of house (including roof structure repair), new copper gutters and downpipes erected on Garden Study, house and Garage, foundations to Garden Study entry repaired, existing roof tiles re-laid, conservation of Garden Temple, trellis on western side of the house.
- 2004 – repointing sandstone base of House
- 2005 – fumigation of furniture and rugs (borer & weevils), spraying regime in place for azalea fungi and lace bugs, collection of garden photographs (c. 1985-2000) purchased, Trust records lodged in Ku-Ring-Gai library, catalogue of collection (furniture, garden furniture, original fabric, artefacts, memorabilia, paintings, photos, papers, documents, books, magazines, newspapers etc. (work was begun in 2004, with an MFArts grant), Pigeon House re-roofed and repaired, front of house limewash restored, timber railings painted, garage doors and lime-washed walls of garden study to be done summer 05/6, tallow wood verandah/eastern loggia flooring repaired/replaced where decayed – i.e. full length of front verandah floor now repaired. Work commenced on restoring two chairs once in the internal study and main bedroom. Also repairs to small broken table in drawing room, and 14th-century Persian bowl in garden study.
- 2005–06 – Painting, repairs to roofing, eaves and flooring, fumigation of borer and weevil infestations, restoration of artefacts and furniture undertaken. Large number of Professor Waterhouse's books gifted back to the Trust. Project completed establishing a catalogue framework, informing the ongoing volunteer detailed cataloguing work of the collection.

== Museum ==
The Eryldene Trust was established in 1979 by members of the local community to fund raise for the purchase and maintenance of the property. In 1993, the house opened as a museum and operates under the administration of the Eryldene Trust. It is open to the public at set times from April to September.

== Heritage listing ==
As at 12 June 2007, Eryldene is of outstanding cultural significance being the most intact surviving example of the work of William Hardy Wilson, the prominent early twentieth-century Australian architect, artist, writer and advocate of the Colonial Revival style. It comprises a residence, complementary outbuildings and garden setting, reflective of the close similarity of interests of both architect and client, Professor E. G. Waterhouse. The garden was developed by its owner to a remarkable individual character and was the setting for his world-renowned efforts in developing the nomenclature and hybridisation of camellias. It remains a resource for their study. The house, gardens and outbuildings are significantly intact, with some room settings retaining their original furnishings and detail.

The place is also of considerable aesthetic significance for its demonstration of an example of a garden as an extension of a house, with a series of open air rooms furnished with trees, shrubs and flowers, proportioned garden structures (temple, garden study, teahouse/tennis pavilion, fountain, pigeon-house).

Eryldene was listed on the New South Wales State Heritage Register on 2 April 1999 having satisfied the following criteria. It is important in demonstrating the course, or pattern, of cultural or natural history in New South Wales.

Eryldene has historical significance through its association with Professor E. G. Waterhouse who had a distinguished career in linguistics, arts and horticulture. It is also, arguably, the most significant surviving residence designed by William Hardy, celebrated for his influence on Australian architecture in the first half of the twentieth century.

It shows aesthetic characteristics and/or a high degree of creative or technical achievement in New South Wales.

Eryldene is a sophisticated design entity, aimed at achieving harmony of beauty and utility. It was created for the specific purpose of introducing aesthetic experience into the daily lives of its inhabitants and their visitors. It is one of the earliest, most complex and developed examples of the Colonial Revival style of architecture and the most complete example of its designers work remaining.

It as a strong association with a particular community or cultural group in New South Wales for social, cultural or spiritual reasons.

Eryldene is not only a focus for admirers of Professor Waterhouse's life and works, but also reflects cultured, intellectual life in Sydney from the First World War to the Modern period.

The camellia collection at Eryldene, remains living, evolving evidence of the Professor's contribution to the nomenclature and hybridisation of camellias and a resource for the future study of the genus.

== See also ==
- Australian residential architectural styles
- Purulia (Wahroonga)
