= Purulia, Wahroonga =

Heritage-listed residence in Wahroonga, Sydney

Purulia
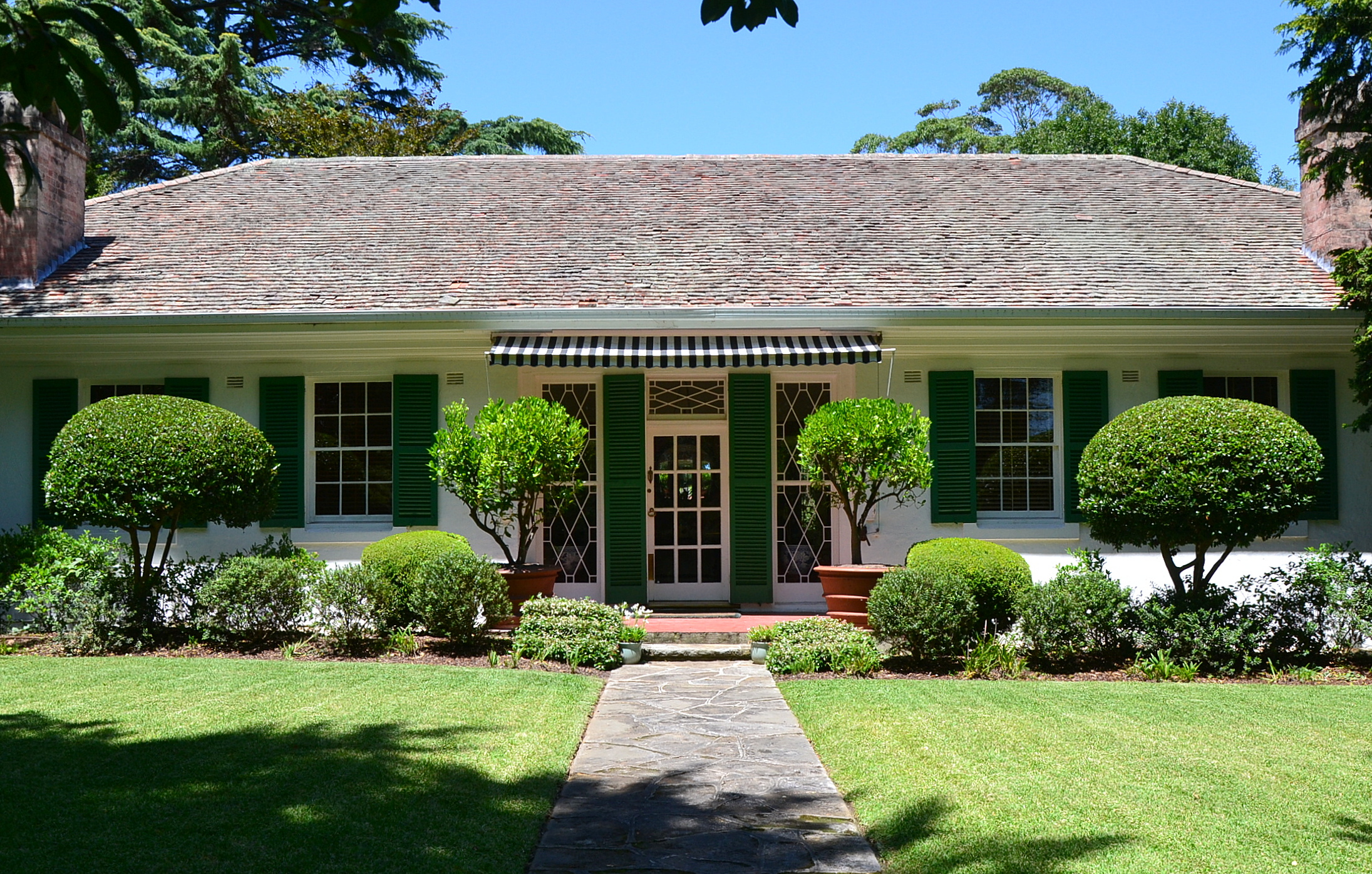
- Purulia, pictured in 2013

- Location within Sydney Location within Australia
- 33°43′40″S 151°07′04″E
- Location: 16 Fox Valley Road, Wahroonga, Ku-ring-gai Council, New South Wales, Australia

History
- Built: 1912–1913

Site notes
- Architect: William Hardy Wilson

New South Wales Heritage Register
- Official name: Purulia
- Type: State heritage (complex / group)
- Designated: 2 April 1999
- Reference no.: 184
- Type: House
- Category: Residential buildings (private)

Purulia is a heritage-listed residence at 16 Fox Valley Road in the Sydney suburb of Wahroonga in the Ku-ring-gai Council local government area of New South Wales, Australia. It was designed by William Hardy Wilson and built from 1912 to 1913. It was added to the New South Wales State Heritage Register on 2 April 1999.

== History ==
The real spirit of the 20th century came to Australian architecture with the domestic work of a quartet of practitioners after the World War I. Between them they encompassed all the virtues and the vices, the strengths and the weaknesses which have marked the last 50 years. The only thing they had in common was a conviction that architectural thinking had to start at a more basic level than anything that had been known for a hundred years.

The group of thinking-architects responsible for ushering in the 20th century were William Hardy Wilson, Robin Dods, Harold Desbrowe-Annear and Walter Burley Griffin. They worked in different places and they worked individually. But between them they covered most of the ideas and attitudes that followed. Because, with the exception of Griffin, they worked almost exclusively on houses, their effect was strongest on domestic work. The same depth of thought and changes which they brought to homes did not begin to percolate into other types of building, which merely acquired from them the vices of individualism to compound their blatant stylism, for another 40 years.

William (later Hardy) Wilson had been born in Sydney in 1881. His search for architectural truth, a deep love and appreciation of beauty, an interest in history and an abiding faith in the concept of the artist-architect led him to strive for the pre-Victorian virtues. But his was not mere copyism. Sensitive to the underlying qualities of colonial architecture, he sought to apply their timeless principles to his own work.

In 1905 Wilson went to England and enrolled in the Architectural Association School of Architecture in London and also worked a draftsman for William Flockhart in Bond Street. The chief draftsman in that office, Leonard Rothrie, introduced him to the Chelsea Art Club, where he met English sculptor Francis Derwent Ward and Scottish painter George Henry, as well as Australian artists including Tom Roberts, Arthur Streeton and George Lambert.

In 1908 Wilson and Stacy Neave (another architect from Sydney) commenced their grand tour of Europe and North America, where they found the work of McKim, Mead & White and the American Colonial Revival style particularly impressive. It was during this tour that Wilson realised the influence of geography was crucial to the development of art and architecture.

In 1911 Wilson changed his name legally to William Hardy Wilson and joined Neave to form Wilson & Neave. When Neave served in World War I, Wilson closed the practice and concentrated on writing and completing his drawings of old colonial architecture in NSW and Tasmania and building his own house, Purulia.

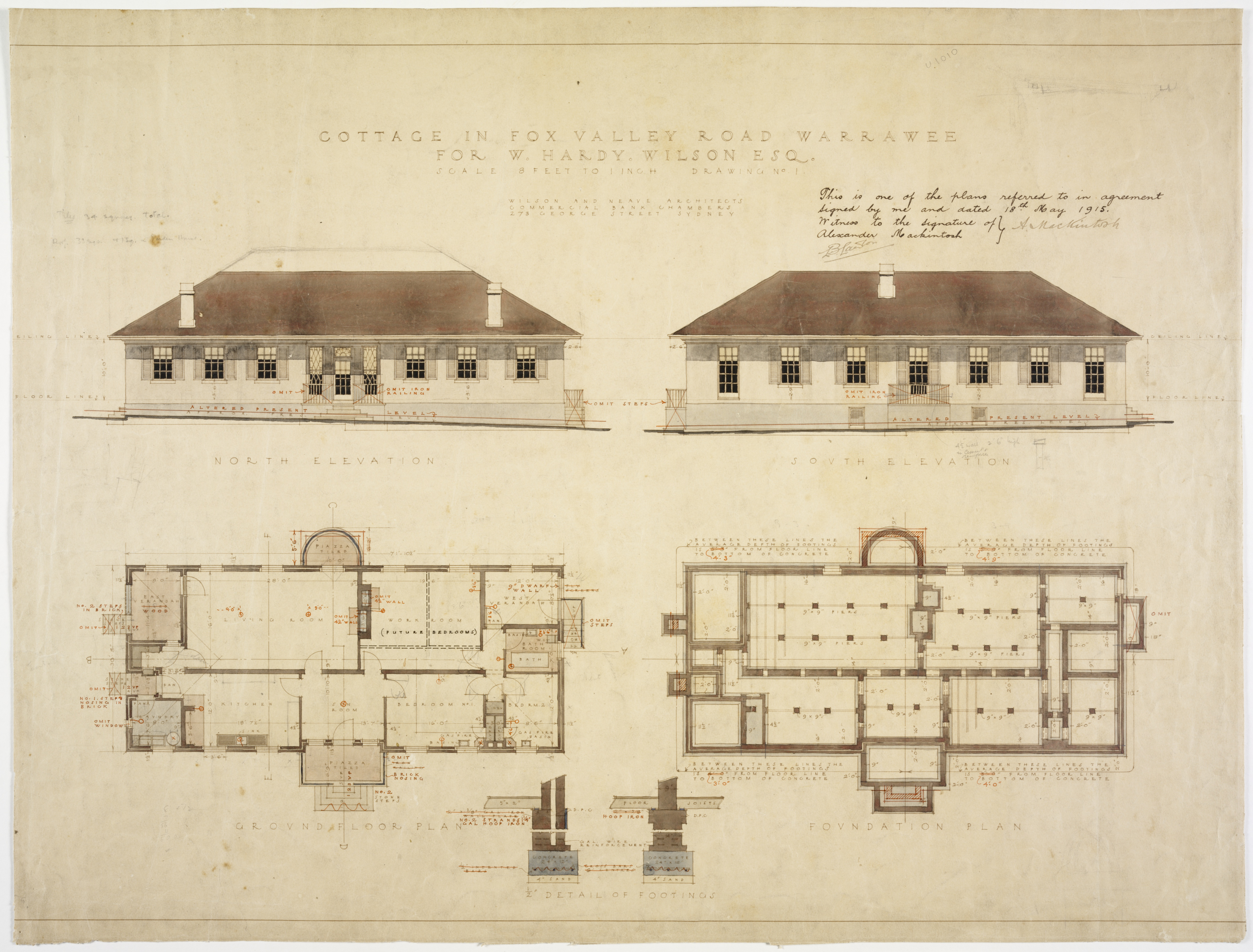
Architectural drawing of Purulia, Wahroonga 1916

In 1912 he built, after years of thought, his own home, Purulia, at Wahroonga, a suburb to the north of the Sydney central business district. Designed for servantless living, the house was a simple rectangle in plan with plain plastered walls painted white, a low-pitched roof covered in multi-coloured shingle tiles and with boxed eaves. The windows, simple rectangles with Georgian sashes and louvered shutters, were protected by striped canvas awnings. At a time when Queen Anne (revival) was riding high and in an area with pretensions to being the elite suburb of Sydney, its barrenness brought a deputation from outraged neighbours who claimed the values of their properties would be undermined. Wilson could not be stopped. When it was finished he had created a home of honesty, simplicity, sincerity and integrity. Wilson claimed it was not a masterpiece. But it was his. He never produced anything better and its influence was widespread. It became a prototype for all North Shore homes and, to the next generation, the epitome of respectability.

Anticipating the changing domestic situation, he planned Purulia as a "maidless flat" and made the kitchen a pleasant family room. Overall, the house was very modern for its time. Describing the building of Purulia, he (Wilson) wrote: 'It is a rectangular cottage covered with an unbroken hipped roof. As the walls arose square, bleak and factory like, consternation filled the souls of neighbours dwelling in multi-angular villas. By the time the brickwork was finished their indignation could not be contained....I found an artist making shingle tiles and from him secured curved uneven, overburnt and many coloured rejects from myriads of flawless tiles. The roof of Purulia is like a venerable Persian rug of quiet and glowing colour.'

Today the style of Purulia has become quite a prototype of Sydney's north shore. Features include well proportioned rooms and windows, the typical Wilson use of stone and whitewashed walls, louvred shutters, the colonnaded facade of the garage, the summer house, the brass door step and the general utility of the house and garden.

In seeking out and drawing the buildings for his "Old Colonial Architecture in New South Wales and Tasmania", Hardy Wilson became aware of the siting and gardens of early colonial houses. He was the first to recognise and appreciate a characteristic mid-19th century style of gardening in New South Wales. For nearly 50 years his was the only voice stressing its importance and his descriptions - as vivid and full blown as the late summer gardens he visited - are still the most evocative. Wilson looked at these gardens with a painter's eye, not the analytical eye of a designer. He was neither botanist not horticulturist. He appreciated their siting, colour and texture rather than their layout and details.

Of large forest trees he admired only the picturesque angophora (A.floribunda or A.subvelutina), the "apple oak" of the colonists; and, presumably the turpentines (Syncarpia glomulifera) which he planted along the rear boundaries of Purulia. He designed 5 gardens: Eryldene (Gordon), Purulia, Macquarie Cottage (Pymble), a garden for "An Ideal Australian Home" and for a "Standard Cottage" for the William Moore Trust at Gordon. The latter were not carried out. Purulia and Macquarie Cottage have been altered. Eryldene presents a problem as in its final form it displays so much the taste and horticultural expertise of its owner, Professor Waterhouse, that Wilson's contribution is difficult to assess, and since it predates the other gardens, the influence of "Professor Pymble" on these should be considered. The similarities between all Wilson's garden plans are marked.

From his love and knowledge of colonial gardens came his choice of plants. The range is limited, but it contrasts with the ubiquitous palms, brush box and hybrid roses of contemporary gardens as stringkingly as his unbroken colour-washed walls contrasted with the redness of his neighbours' "multangular villas".

Wilson wrote:

'Around the boundaries of Purulia there are oleanders (Nerium oleander) red and white. Between the oleanders and the northern front there are perpendicular poplars (Lombardy poplar, (Populus nigra 'Italica')) to balance the horizontal lines of the building. On the southern side the distant city will be framed through olives (Olea europaea) grown grey, twisted and fruitful. In a wide circle around the house there are oranges (Citrus aurantium) and mandarins (C.reticulata). Camellias are slowly opening dark glossy leaves before the wall spaces. Beside the stone flagged path bordered with box (Buxus sempervirens), that leads from gate to door, there are fragrant shrubs, diosma (Coleonema pulchrum), lemon verbena (Lippia citriodora), lavenders (Lavandula spp.).'

Wilson planned his gardens with layouts of an easy, but nevertheless rigorously applied formal geometry, which owes little to colonial or contemporary English garden design (to which Wilson makes no reference in any of his writings). They are unmistakably gardens designed by an architect who, though admiring the architectural work of Lutyens, probably knew little of current English gardens. This geometry ... reached its extreme in his own house, Purulia, where the rectangular bungalow is centred in a circle of citrus trees, a conceit which can only be appreciated fully in plan form. Upon this circle Wilson playfully constructs an elaborate network of arcing and radial paths, cross paths and further circles. The geometry is complex but not forced and the architectural detailing is deliberately simple - flagged paths and summer houses with columns of whitewashed tree trunks. Behind the house an apsidal planting of fruiting olives surrounds a sundial on the central axis and screens a semi-annular kitchen and fruit garden.

The positioning of the summer house at Purulia, on the cross-axis of the central path and diagonally to the right of the front door, is similar to the positioning of the more sophisticated one at Eryldene. The simple stone-flagged central path is common to all the gardens, yet it is a cottage detail, not found in the old colonial gardens of the County of Cumberland which Wilson knew.

Another notable Wilson designed house of this era was Macquarie Cottage, Pymble (1919) for H. Dunstan Vane.

In 1920 Wilson & Neave took on John Berry as partner, becoming Wilson, Neave & Berry (1920–27), a firm noted for the Colonial Revival style of architecture for domestic design: fat, low-squatting Georgian boxes with colonnaded verandahs, spider-web fanlights on entrance doors and multi-paned windows with shutters. The firms style followed the Colonial Revival based on the United States idiom, but also looked to Australian colonial architecture for inspiration. This style became very popular in the 1920s. In 1921 Wilson went to China and took lessons in Chinese painting under Kungpah King (Jin Chen); his travels to China's major cities, Peking (Beijing), Hangzhou, Shanghai, Canton (Guangshou) and Macao had a profound influence in his architectural philosophy and design. After Wilson's visit to China in 1921, the firm incorporated Oriental motifs and details, examples of which are found at Eryldene, Gordon (1914–36) and Peapes Department Store, Sydney (1923). In 1922 Wilson sold Purulia and travelled to England and Europe, where, in Vienna, he supervised the collotype reproductions for "Old Colonial architecture in New South Wales and Tasmania" (1924), his publication that would foster great interest in an Australian Colonial Revival. In 1925 Wilson returned to Sydney, where he became disillusioned with the state of Australian architecture and began writing his view sand ideas in a fictionalised biography "The dawn of a new civilisation" (1929) under a pseudonym of Richard Le Mesurer. In 1927 he completed his last design - the tennis pavilion (later called the Tea House) at Eryldene in Gordon for Prof. E. G. and Janet Waterhouse - the epitome of "a new style in architecture, the development in one style of Chinese and European classic", retired from practice and left for England.

== Description ==
=== Garden ===
The design of Purulia and its garden were closely integrated by Hardy Wilson. The garden design is based on a formal geometry which rises out of the rectangular form of the house. Many of the trees planted by Wilson remain as do the original sandstone flagged path and the octagonal summerhouse. A garage to one side of the front garden was added at a later date and features a colonnaded facade that is most sympathetic to the design of the house and garden.

A fine sandstone wall with timber gates defines the street boundary of the property.

Of large forest trees he admired only the picturesque angophora (A.floribunda or A.subvelutina), the "apple oak" of the colonists; and, presumably the turpentines (Syncarpia glomulifera) which he planted along the rear boundaries of Purulia. He designed five gardens: Eryldene (Gordon), Purulia, Macquarie Cottage (Pymble), a garden for "An Ideal Australian Home" and for a "Standard Cottage" for the William Moore Trust at Gordon. The latter were not carried out. Purulia and Macquarie Cottage have been altered. Eryldene presents a problem as in its final form it displays so much the taste and horticultural expertise of its owner, Professor Waterhouse, that Wilson's contribution is difficult to assess, and since it predates the other gardens, the influence of "Professor Pymble" on these should be considered. The similarities between all Wilson's garden plans are marked.

From his love and knowledge of colonial gardens came his choice of plants. The range is limited, but it contrasts with the ubiquitous palms, brush box and hybrid roses of contemporary gardens as stringkingly as his unbroken colour-washed walls contrasted with the redness of his neighbours' "multangular villas".

'Around the boundaries of Purulia', Wilson wrote, 'there are oleanders (Nerium oleander) red and white. Between the oleanders and the northern front there are perpendicular poplars (Lombardy poplar, (Populus nigra 'Italica')) to balance the horizontal lines of the building. On the southern side the distant city will be framed through olives (Olea europaea) grown grey, twisted and fruitful. In a wide circle around the house there are oranges (Citrus aurantium) and mandarins (C.reticulata). Camellias are slowly opening dark glossy leaves before the wall spaces. Beside the stone flagged path bordered with box (Buxus sempervirens), that leads from gate to door, there are fragrant shrubs, diosma (Coleonema pulchrum), lemon verbena (Lippia citriodora), lavenders (Lavandula spp.).'

Wilson planned his gardens with layouts of an easy, but nevertheless rigorously applied formal geometry, which owes little to colonial or contemporary English garden design (to which Wilson makes no reference in any of his writings). They are unmistakably gardens designed by an architect who, though admiring the architectural work of Lutyens, probably knew little of current English gardens. This geometry ... reached its extreme in his own house, Purulia, where the rectangular bungalow is centred in a circle of citrus trees, a conceit which can only be appreciated fully in plan form. Upon this circle Wilson playfully constructs an elaborate network of arcing and radial paths, cross paths and further circles. The geometry is complex but not forced and the architectural detailing is deliberately simple - flagged paths and summer houses with columns of whitewashed tree trunks. Behind the house an apsidal planting of fruiting olives surrounds a sundial on the central axis and screens a semi-annular kitchen and fruit garden.

The positioning of the summer house at Purulia, on the cross-axis of the central path and diagonally to the right of the front door, is similar to the positioning of the more sophisticated one at Eryldene. The simple stone-flagged central path is common to all the gardens, yet it is a cottage detail, not found in the old colonial gardens of the County of Cumberland which Wilson knew.

The garden has some fine trees planted by Wilson - ginkgos, weeping elms and maples, copper beeches, dogwoods and citrus trees.

=== House ===
Designed for servantless living, the house was a simple rectangle in plan with plain plastered walls painted white, a low-pitched roof covered in multi-coloured shingle tiles and with boxed eaves. The windows, simple rectangles with Georgian sashes and louvered shutters, were protected by striped canvas awnings.

(Wilson) wrote: 'It is a rectangular cottage covered with an unbroken hipped roof. As the walls arose square, bleak and factory like, consternation filled the souls of neighbours dwelling in multi-angular villas. By the time the brickwork was finished their indignation could not be contained. I found an artist making shingle tiles and from him secured curved uneven, overburnt and many coloured rejects from myriads of flawless tiles. The roof of Purulia is like a venerable Persian rug of quiet and glowing colour.'

Features include well proportioned rooms and windows, the typical Wilson use of stone and whitewashed walls, louvred shutters, the colonnaded facade of the garage, the summer house, the brass door step and the general utility of the house and garden.

=== Condition ===
As at 12 June 2007, many of the trees planted by Wilson remain as do the original sandstone flagged path and the octagonal summerhouse.

=== Modifications and dates ===
A large portion of the garden was removed many years ago when the rear portion of the original block was subdivided. A garage to one side of the front garden was added at a later date and features a colonnaded façade that is most sympathetic to the design of the house and garden.

== Heritage listing ==
As at 12 June 2007, Purulia is a house and garden designed by one of our most outstanding architects. It is reputed to be William Hardy Wilson's best work. The influence of this house was widespread and it became a prototype for many North Shore homes.

It is also rare as a garden (one of only 5) designed by Hardy Wilson, albeit altered.

The name Purulia should mean much to architects in Australia, for it was the home of William Hardy Wilson, who has done so much to make Australia conscious of the heritage of fine architecture she possesses. The houses he built and the books he wrote are lessons in good design. His book "Colonial Architecture in NSW & Tasmania" is known all over the world for its fine drawings and the beautiful buildings illustrated therein. He was a pioneer, for his work was revolutionary in a period which favoured a medley of unnecessarily elaborate styles. A good example of the opposition he encountered was a deputation to the local Council when Purulia was being built to have it condemned as an unsightly building.

At a time when Queen Anne (revival) was riding high and in an area with pretensions to being the elite suburb of Sydney, its barrenness brought a deputation from outraged neighbours who claimed the values of their properties would be undermined. Wilson could not be stopped. When it was finished he had created a home of honesty, simplicity, sincerity and integrity. Wilson claimed it was not a masterpiece. But it was his. He never produced anything better and its influence was widespread. It became a prototype for all North Shore homes and, to the next generation, the epitome of respectability.

A house and garden built by one of our most outstanding architects. The garden has some fine trees planted by Wilson - ginkgos, weeping elms and maples, copper beeches, dogwoods and citrus trees.

Purulia was listed on the New South Wales State Heritage Register on 2 April 1999.

== See also ==
- Australian residential architectural styles
- Eryldene (Gordon)
