= William Hardy Wilson =

Australian architect (1881–1955)

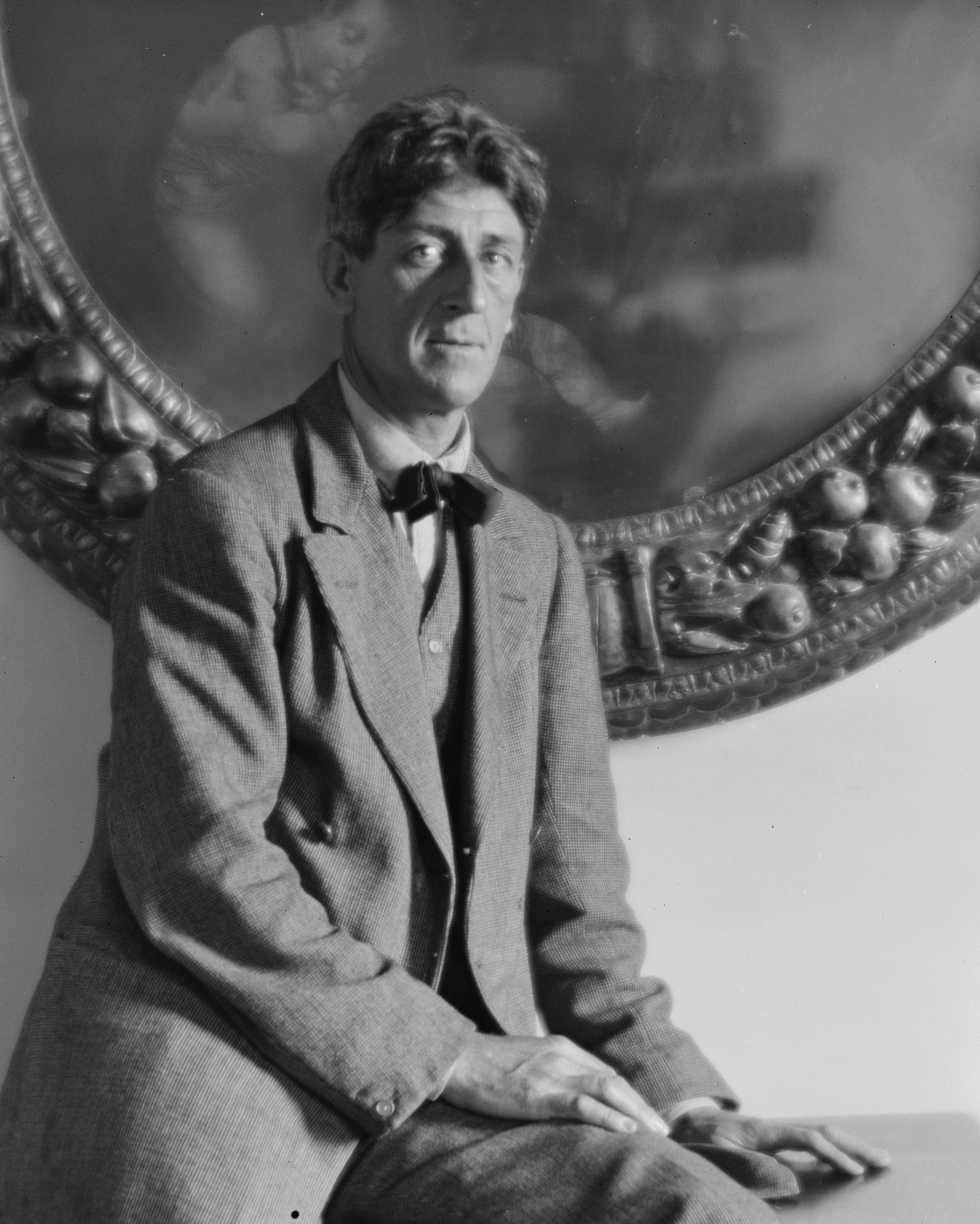
- Born: 14 February 1881; Campbelltown, New South Wales, Australia
- Died: 16 December 1955 (aged 74); Richmond, Victoria
- Education: Newington College; Sydney Technical College
- Occupations: Architect, artist, author
- Buildings: Eryldene, Gordon, New South Wales (built 1914); Purulia, Wahroonga, New South Wales (built 1916); War Memorial, Newington College (built 1921)
- Projects: Domestic architecture in Australia (published 1919); Old Colonial Architecture of New South Wales and Tasmania (published 1924)

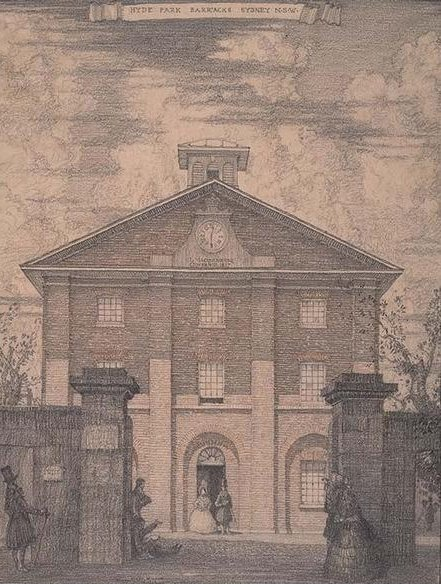
Drawing of Hyde Park Barracks by Wilson.

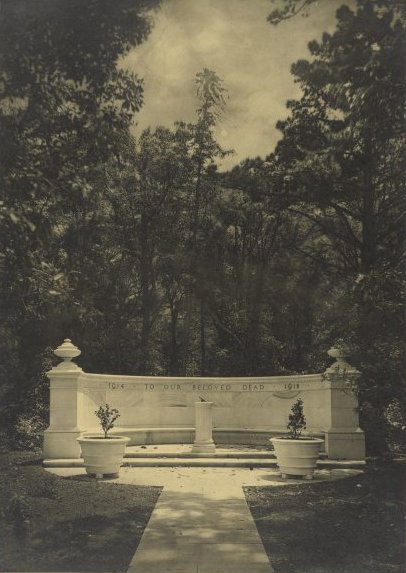
Harold Cazneaux photograph of Newington College War Memorial, designed by Wilson.

William Hardy Wilson (14 February 1881 – 16 December 1955) was an Australian architect, artist and author. He "is regarded as one of the most outstanding architects of the twentieth century".

== Early years ==
Wilson was born in Campbelltown, New South Wales in February 1881, the second surviving son of William and Jessie Wilson, and attended Newington College (1893–1898). He was a younger brother of Barrister David Wilson KC (1870–1965). The following year he was articled to Harry Kent at the firm of Kent & Budden and studied at the Sydney Technical College at night. During this period he took instruction in art from Sydney Long.

== Career ==
Upon completion of his articles he went to England and successfully sat for the intermediate (1906) and final (1908) examinations of the Royal Institute of British Architects. In London his circle of friends included George Washington Lambert and Arthur Streeton, and he served as secretary of the Chelsea Arts Club. Wilson travelled widely in Europe and the United States of America and became interested in the American Colonial style of architecture. After returning to Sydney in 1910, he married Margaret Rachel Reid McKenzie (d.1939), and in 1913 he went into partnership with Stacey Neave in George Street. Wilson exhibited regularly with the Society of Artists, and with other artists he founded the Fine Arts Society. In 1923 his work was hung in the Exhibition of Australian Art at Burlington House, London.

== Architectural legacy ==
Wilson designed mainly homes and small commercial buildings. Having been impressed by the Colonial Revival style in the US, he sought to do something similar in Australia. Nowadays he is particularly remembered for three of his homes, all of them on Sydney's North Shore and all of them now heritage-listed. He is regarded as a key practitioner of the Inter-War Georgian Revival style.

- Eryldene, located in McIntosh Street, Gordon, was designed by Wilson and Prof. Eben Gowrie Waterhouse and built circa 1913. Wilson designed the layout of the gardens as well as garden structures like a moon gate, tea house, fountain, pigeon house, summerhouse and garden furniture. The garden is heritage-listed along with the house. The house shows the influence of the Indian bungalow style. It is open to the public at set times.
- Macquarie Cottage, in Avon Road, Pymble, was built in 1918 in a Georgian Revival style. It is a single-storey house featuring deep eaves, a slate roof and a verandah with columns.
- Purulia, located in Fox Valley Road, Warrawee, was Wilson's own home, designed in Georgian Revival style and built in 1913. It was considered unusual at the time, but eventually had a great influence on the design of North Shore homes. It bears a strong resemblance to Eryldene, with similar gardens and features.
- Montrose House, located at 71-73 Gaskill Street, Canowindra was designed by Wilson for the Bank of New South Wales and built by a local builder, Frank Norrie in 1915. The bank branch was closed in 1988. After the bank's closure the building was initially occupied as an art gallery. In 2015 the building was extensively renovated and has been operated as a bed and breakfast and function centre.

== Published works ==
In 1920, he published The Cow Pasture Road, and Wilson and Neave invited John Berry to join the partnership. The following year Wilson visited China, and his architectural style started at that time to include Oriental elements. Wilson contributed to Art in Australia, The Home, and The Sydney Morning Herald. In 1924 he published Old Colonial Architecture in New South Wales and Tasmania, a large book of his drawings undertaken between 1912 and 1922. His other published books were The Dawn of a New Civilization (1929), Yin Yang (1934), Collapse of Civilization (1936), Grecian and Chinese Architecture (1937), Eucalyptus (1941), Instinct (1945), Atomic Civilization (1949) and Kurrajong: Sit-Look-See (1954).

== Later life ==
In 1927, Wilson left his architectural partnership and lived for three years in London before returning to Australia to live in Melbourne. He moved to Flowerdale in north-west Tasmania in the 1930s, where he contributed philosophical essays to the local newspaper. After the death of his first wife he married Elsie MacLean, and from 1940 they lived between a property at Wandin, near Mount Dandenong, and Kew in Melbourne.

Wilson was an anti-Semite and during the 1930s and 40s an enthusiast for the cause of German and Italian Fascism, an enthusiasm based in large part on his embrace of climatic theories of creative development and, indirectly, the philosophies of Bergson, Nietzsche, and Hegel. He blamed Jews for thwarting his professional advancement and published in 1939 a plan for a guarded settlement for Jewish refugees in the Dandenongs.

Wilson died in Richmond on 16 December 1955, survived by his second wife and by the son of his first marriage.

== Images ==
William Hardy Wilson made drawings of a variety of subjects including early Australian domestic architecture, colonial homesteads and churches, and poultry and other birds.

== Gallery ==
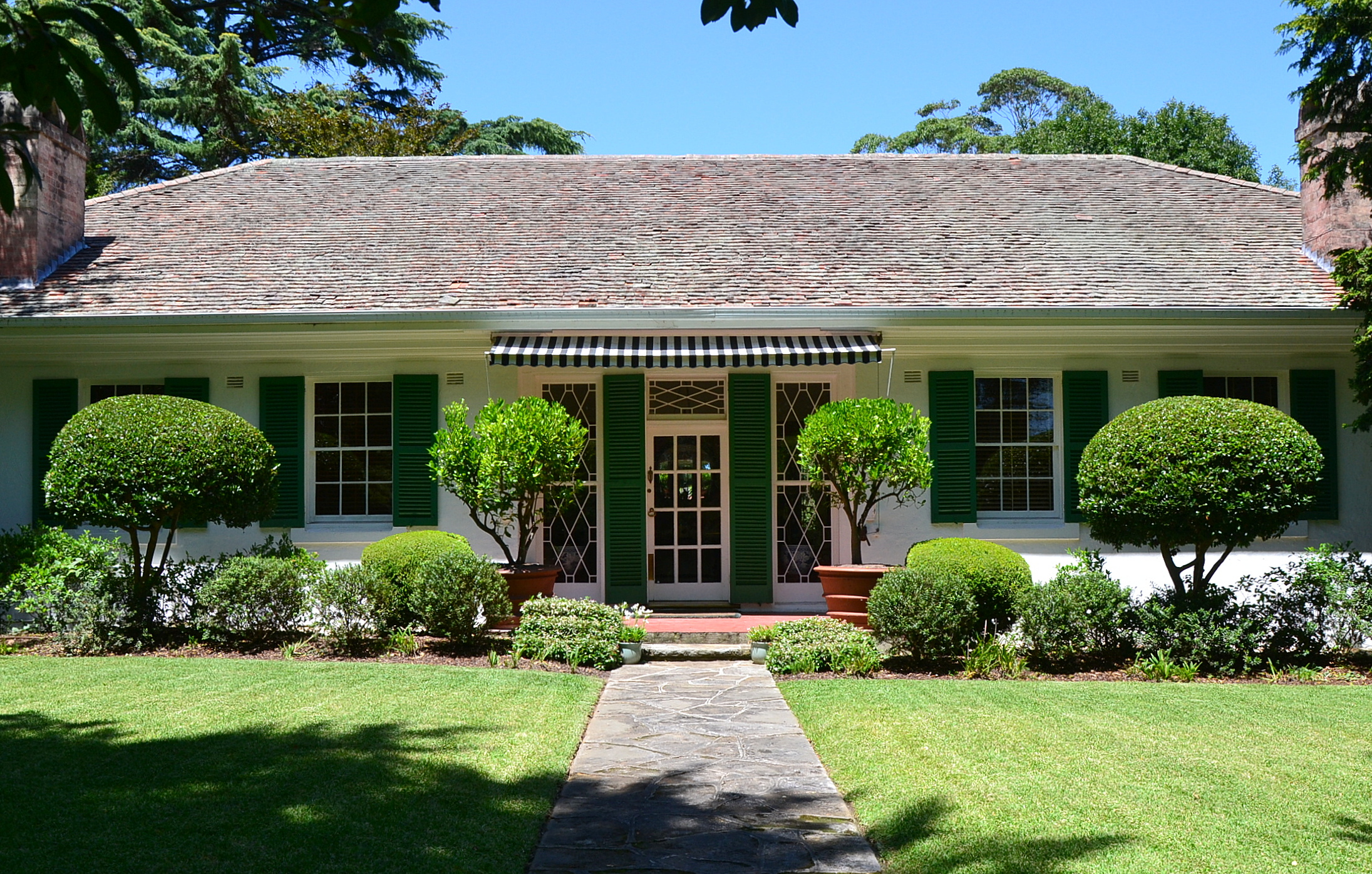
Purulia

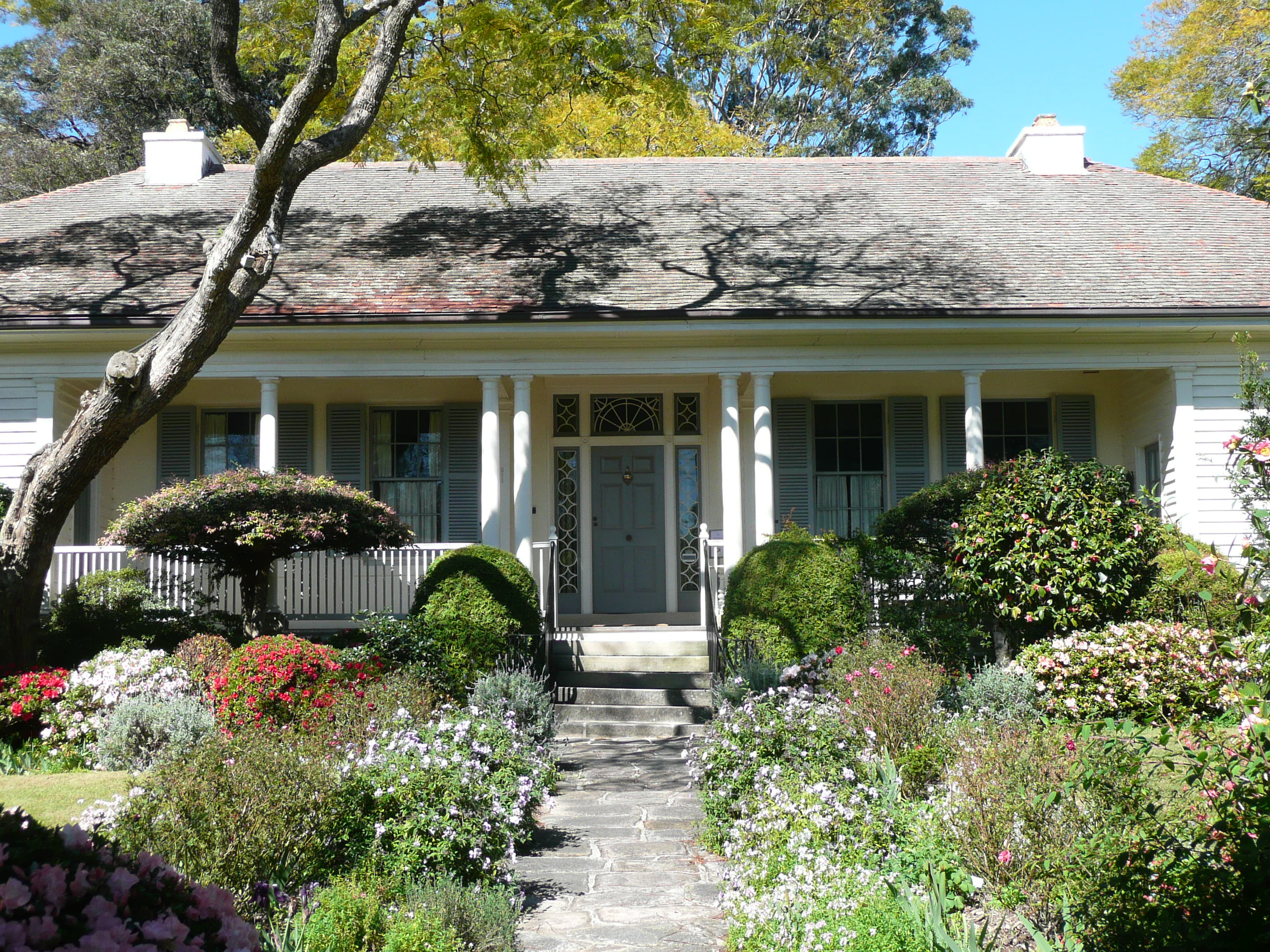
Eryldene

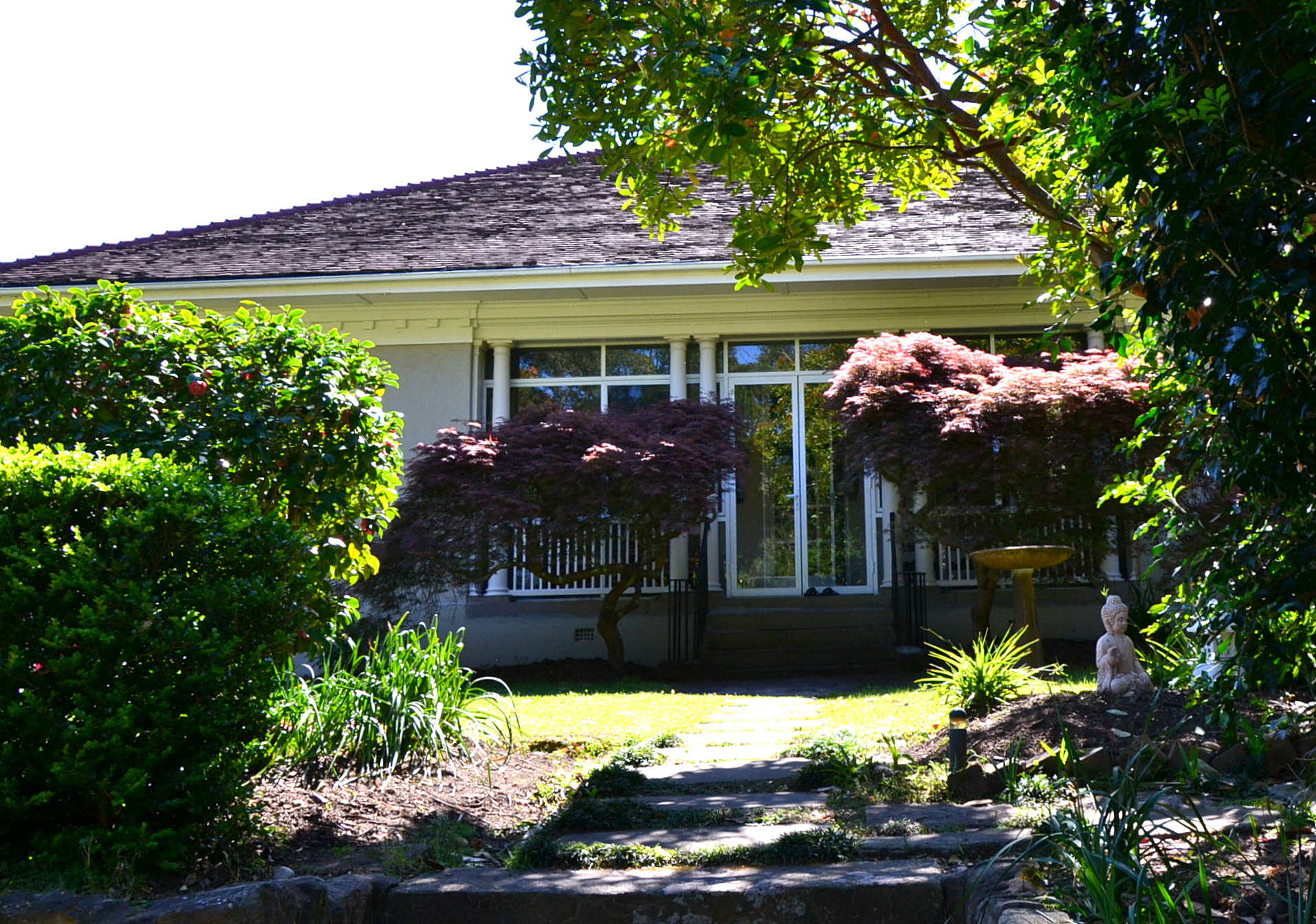
Macquarie Cottage

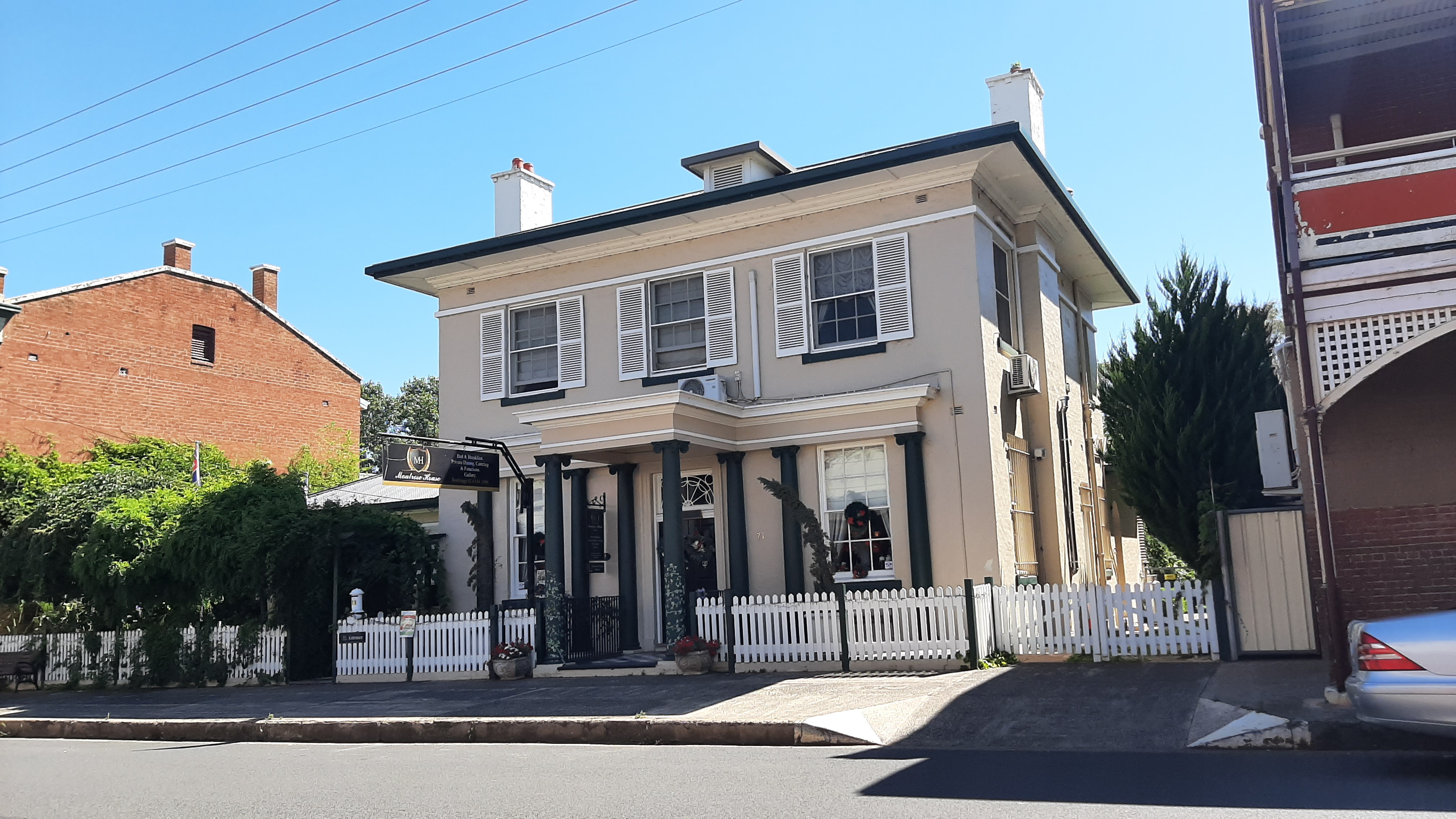
Montrose House, 71 Gaskill Street, Canowindra NSW - formerly Bank of NSW (Westpac) building
