= Trellis =

Architectural structure often used to support plants

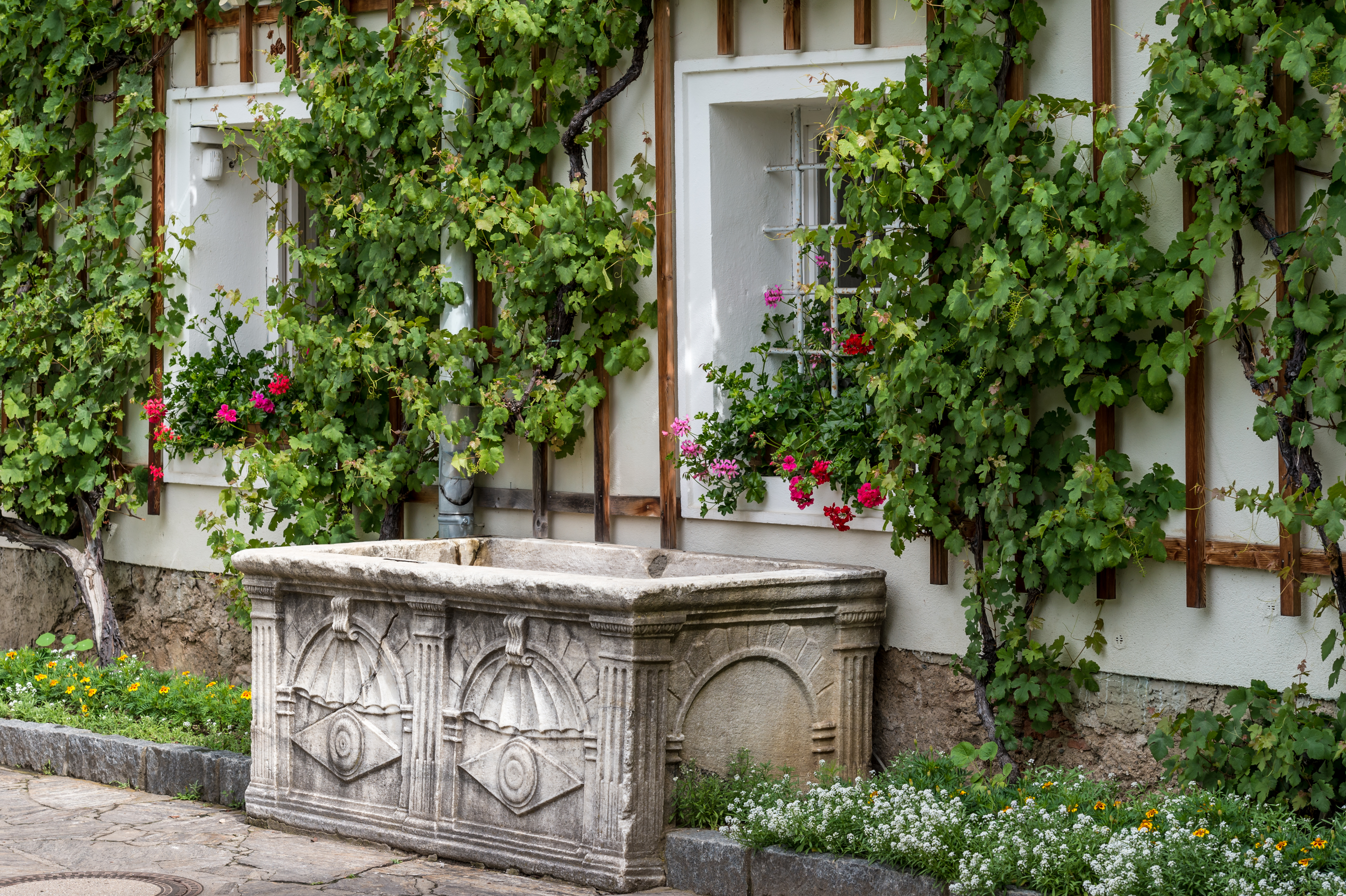
Trellis in the courtyard of the Wernberg monastery, Wernberg, Carinthia, Austria

A trellis (French: treillage) is an architectural structure, usually made from an open framework or lattice of interwoven or intersecting pieces of wood, bamboo, or metal that is normally made to support and display climbing plants, especially shrubs.

== Types ==
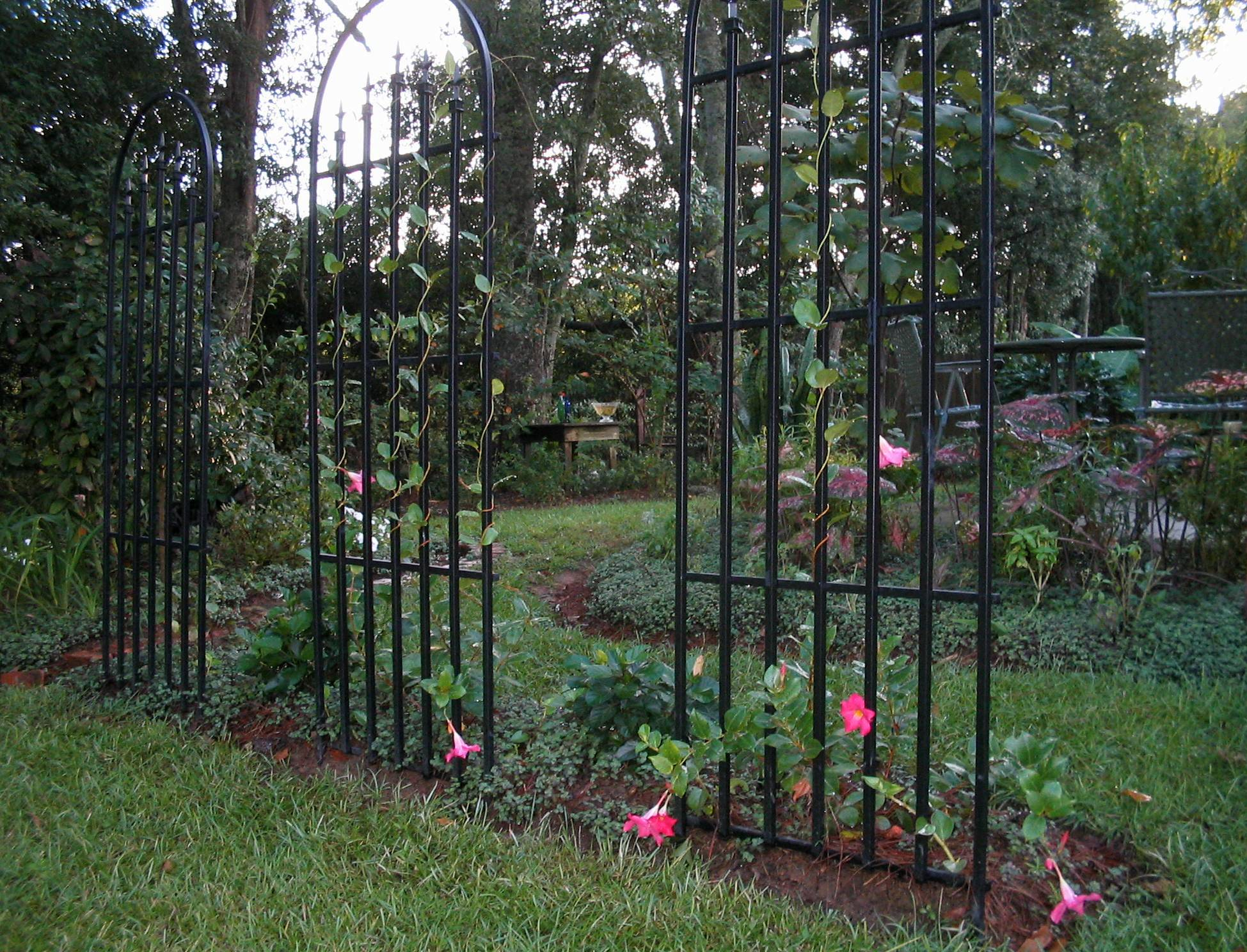
A series of trellises forms the wall of a garden room.

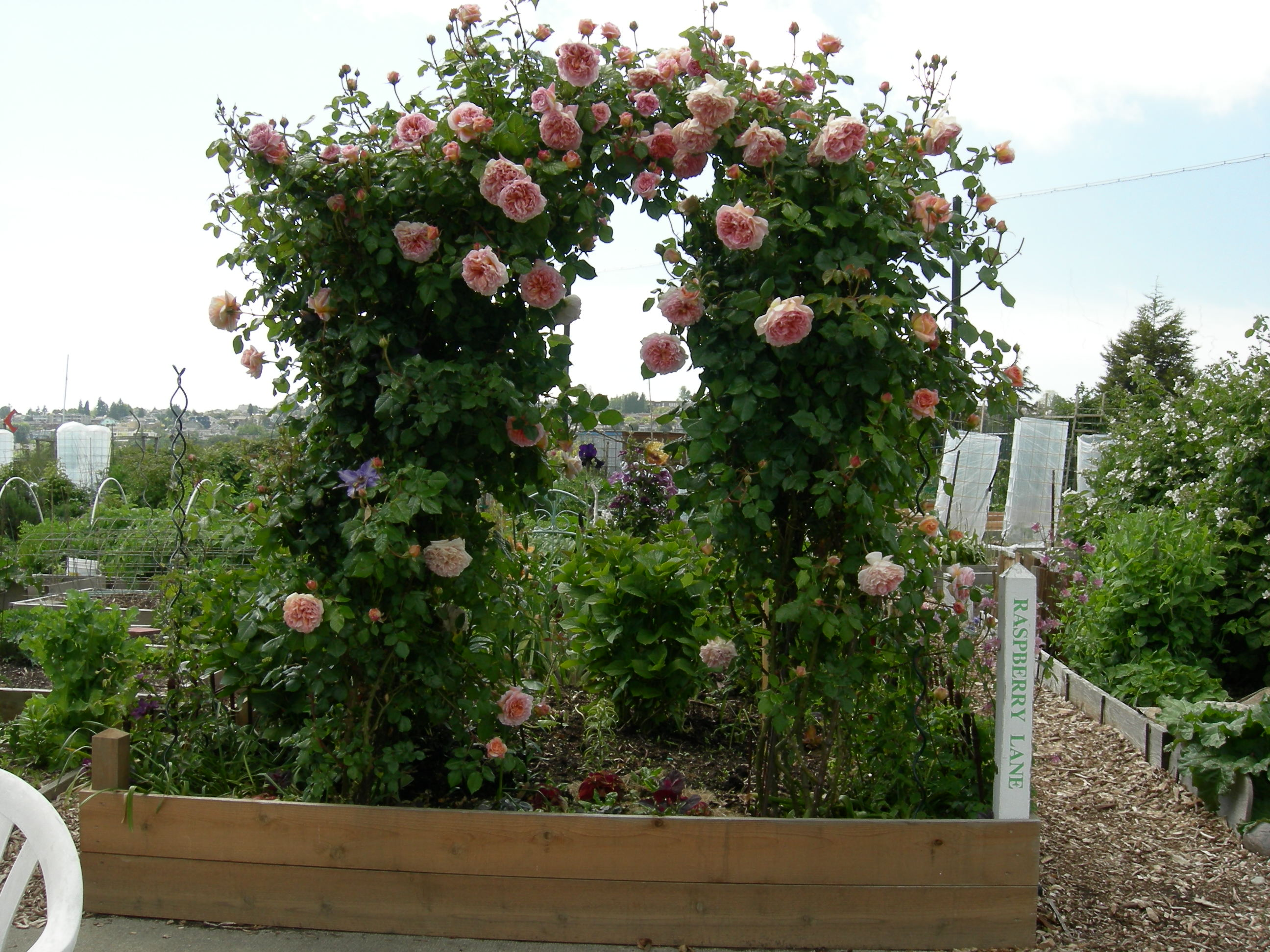
A trellis supports a climbing rose in a raised garden box.

There are many types of trellis for different places and for different plants, from agricultural types, especially in viticulture, which are covered at vine training systems, to garden uses for climbers such as grapevines, clematis, ivy, and climbing roses or other support based growing plants.

The rose trellis is especially common in Europe and other rose-growing areas, and many climbing rose varieties require a trellis to reach their potential as garden plants. Some plants will climb and wrap themselves round a trellis without much artificial help being needed while others need training by passing the growing shoots through the trellis and/or tying them to the framework.

== Uses ==
Trellises can also be referred to as panels, usually made from interwoven wood pieces, attached to fences or the roof or exterior walls of a building. A pergola usually refers to trellis-work that is laid horizontally above head height to provide a partial "roof" in a garden (pergolas are also used in agricultural settings).

== History ==
The trellis was originally intended to support vine stock – which gives its name: lat Trichila (greenery bower). The trellis has been mentioned in literature and botanical works throughout history. Pliny the Younger, in the first and second centuries, wrote about trellises in some of his letters about gardens. In the 19th century, Walt Whitman also mentioned a trellis in his poem Give me the Splendid, Silent Sun.

Trellis was used to support shrubs in espalier, also to separate roads from thickets and diverse sections of vegetable gardens. These sorts of fences were made by the gardeners. When the art of gardening was perfected by André Le Nôtre and Jules Hardouin-Mansart, the treillis became an object of decoration and was entrusted to particular workers named treillageurs. They worked individually until 1769, when they joined the corporation of carpenters. The treillageur has to have at least some elementary notions and principles of architecture and l’art du trait.

A trellis could be designed as a gallery, portico, room or different element of architecture and thus evolved into garden architecture linked to landscaping. In the 20th century landscape architects such as Edouard François, Lewis Duncan, and Gilles Clément, uses trellis, as well as artists such as Nils Udo or Jean-Max Albert whose spatial creations belong to land art, site-specific art, or environmental sculpture. Jean-Max Albert notes the trellis possibilities in visual art: "The trellis permits a visual contact of external and internal elements. It allows [us] to observe together the inside and the outside of a construction. The semi-transparency of the plans permits a simultaneous reading of imbricated volumes".

== Gallery ==
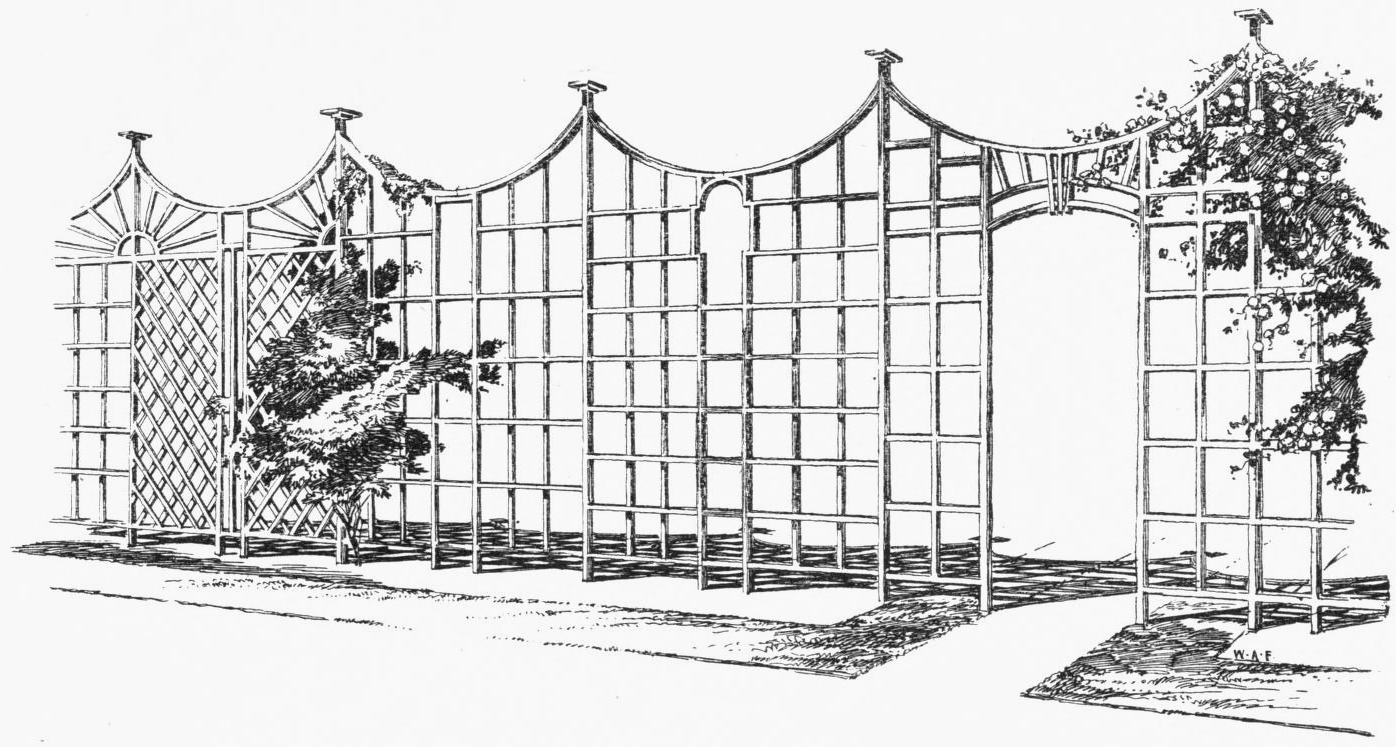
Four styles of trelliswork

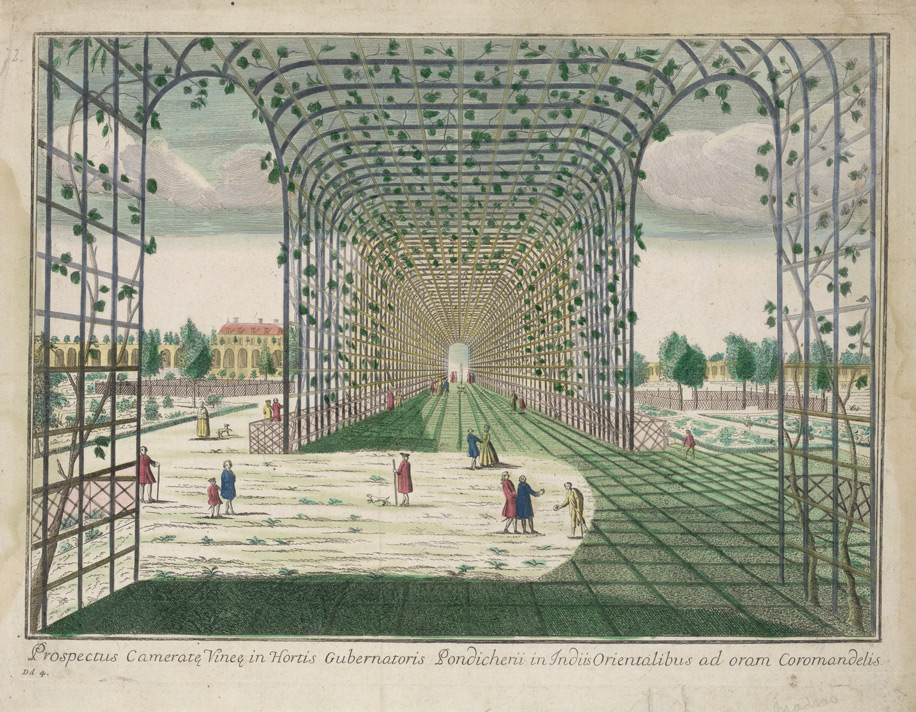
Trellis arcade supporting a vine in French India

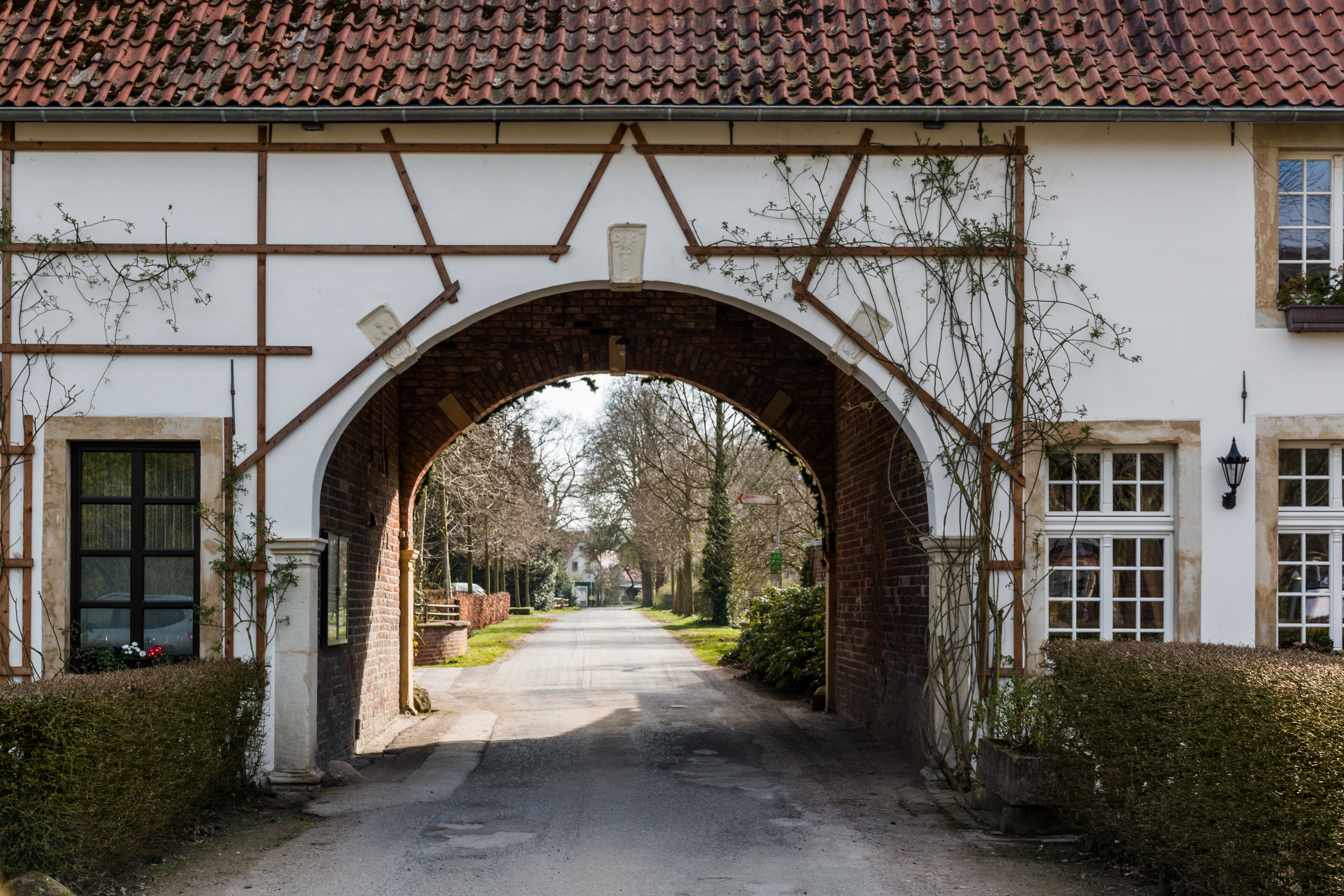
Eastern Gatehouse in Karthaus, Weddern, North Rhine-Westphalia, Germany

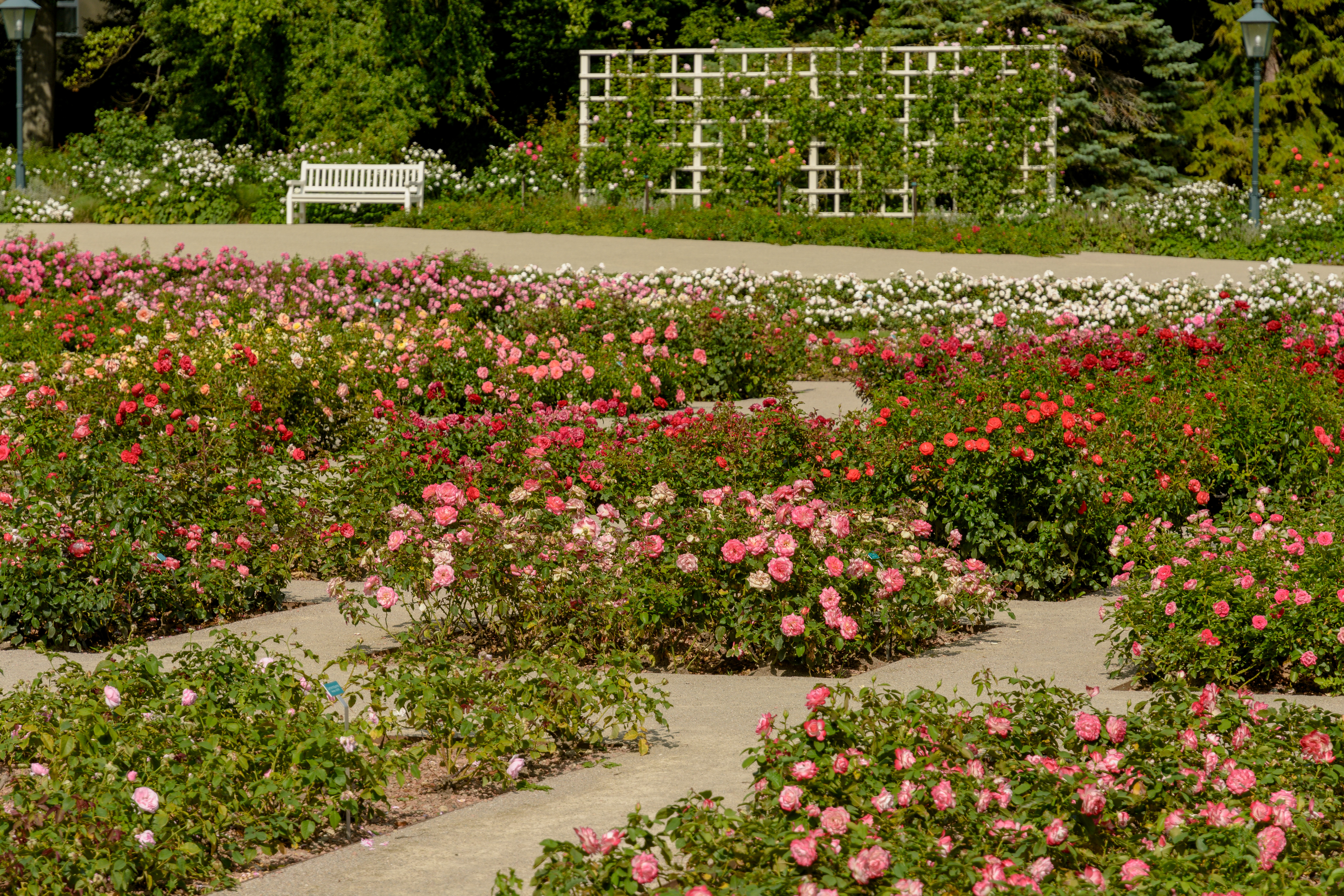
Trellis in Doblhoffpark with Rosarium, Baden bei Wien, Lower Austria, Austria

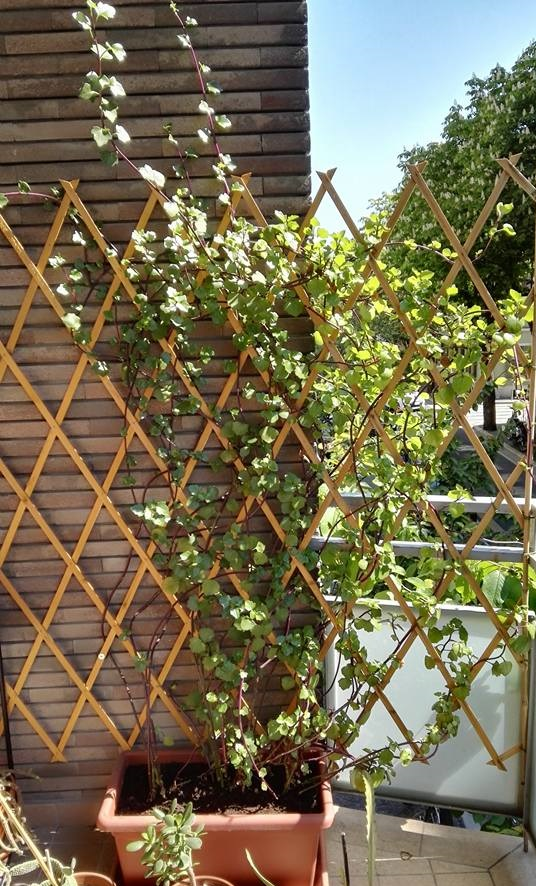
Creeping groundsel growing on a wooden trellis in Italy

== See also ==
- Trellis netting
