= Trellis netting =

Type of netting in horticulture

Trellis netting is a type of netting, usually made from plastic, used to support climbing plants such as cucumbers and grapes.

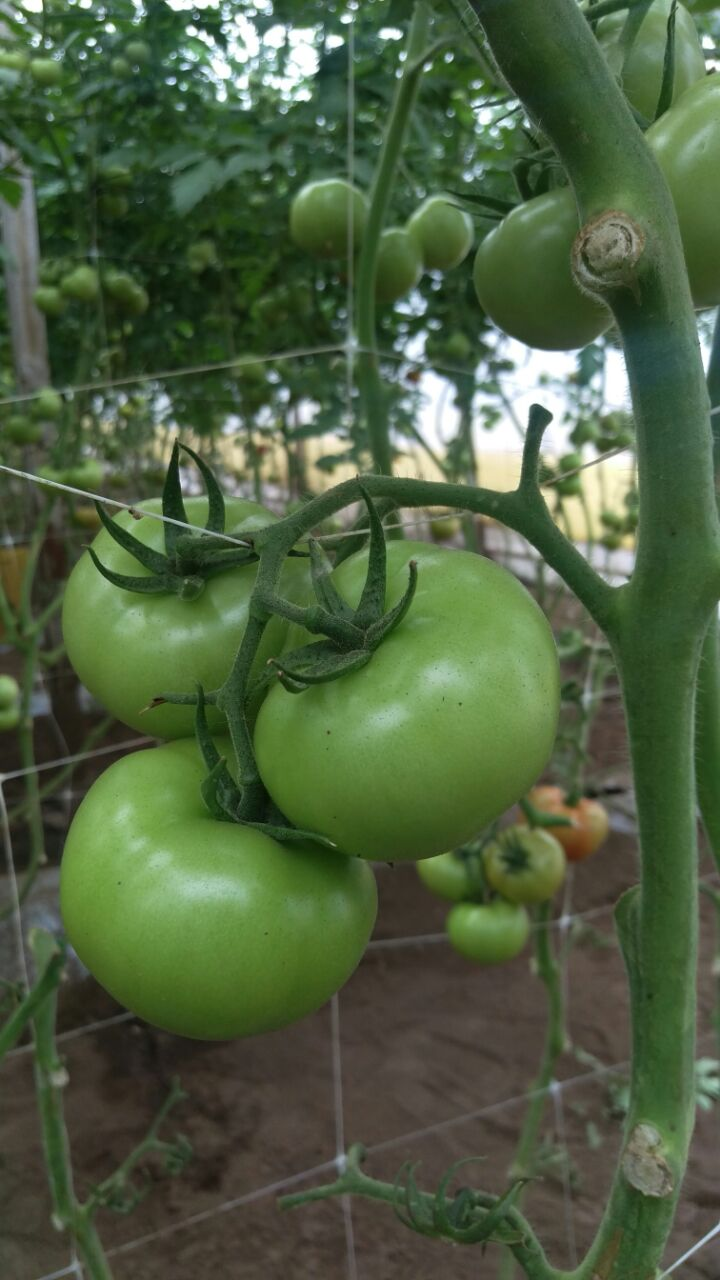
When one uses a trellis net the pedunculum of the fruit of the plant will lean on the mesh

== Available sizes ==
Smaller mesh sizes (between 10 and 15 cm) are usually used for horizontal tutoring of flowers, especially carnations, mums and snaps, because in floriculture growers prefer an opening that will support vertically the flower without letting it tilt or bend because it would lose its commercial value. Larger sized meshes are preferred for vegetable support. especially cucurbits, solanaceae and legumes. The reason horticulturalists prefer a larger mesh size (which simulates the hand weaved raffia systems) is so one can work the two furrows on both sides of the walking isle, without damaging the crop or the plant during harvesting or trimming work.

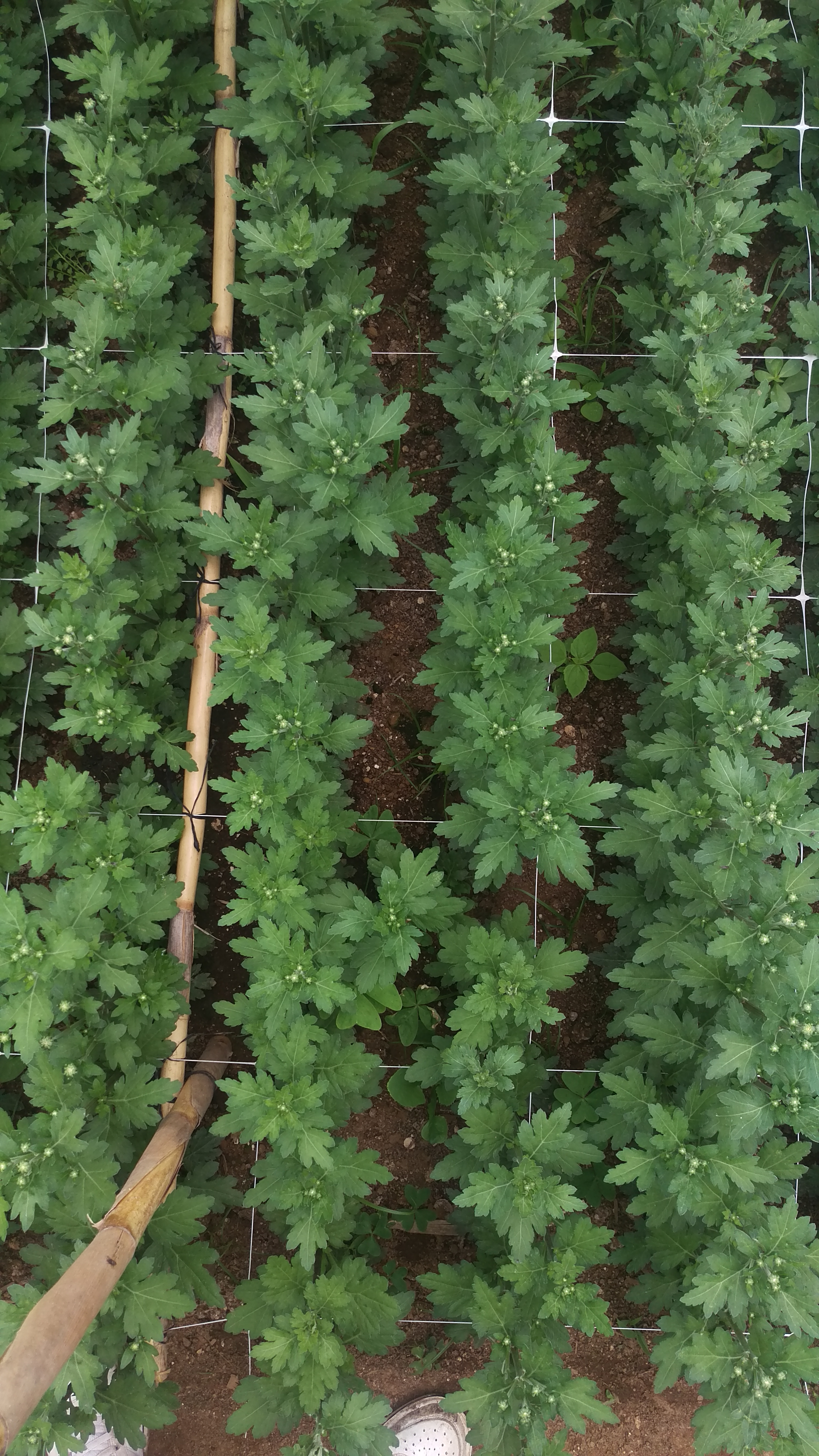
When the netting is used for tutoring flowers, one may install horizontally many layers of netting or move the first layer up as the plants grow.

== Floriculture ==
Flower support netting is installed in many layers over the flower bed. At the extremes of the furrow a net fastening and support system is installed so that the mesh can be stretched tightly over the growing flowers. In between the two extremities of the flower bed, intermediate supports are necessary as to insure that mesh openings lay on top of each other's symmetrically and layer after layer so that flowers may grow straight.

== Horticulture ==
The great majority of horticultural applications of plant support netting are vertical, even though there are also great horizontal uses. When it is used vertically to provide support to the vegetable trellis, the netting is fastened to a line of posts or supports (metal, bamboo or wood) distanced from 1.5 to up to 8 meters (depending to the type of crop, soil type, climate etc.) where the furrow ends have posts that are larger and stronger and preferably have a tension string or twine on top that is anchored on both sides of the furrow and tensioned in between posts.

The use of a large mesh tutoring net installed horizontally over tomatoes or bell peppers in an open field, using a support system similar to the one used in flowers, will allow the plant to grow in between the mesh and the branches loaded with fruits will lean over the mesh completely eliminating the need for further labor in fastening and tying operations.

== Gallery ==
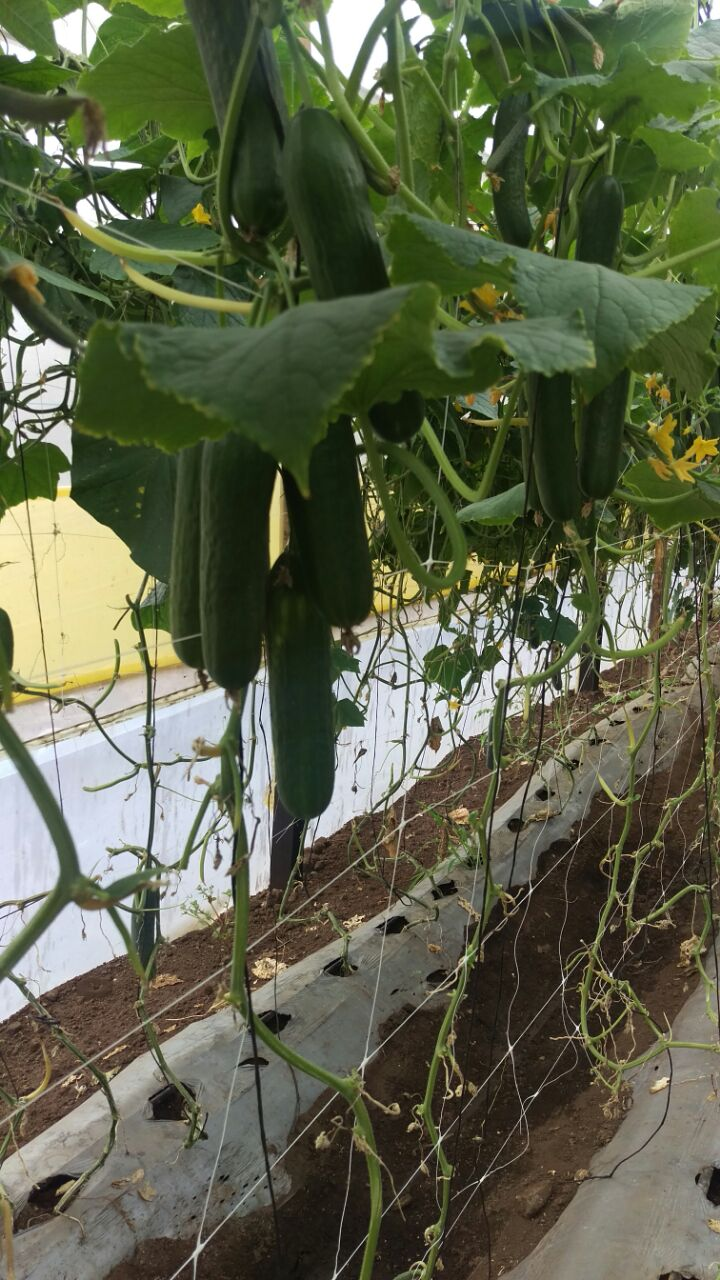
Trellis netting with cucumbers.

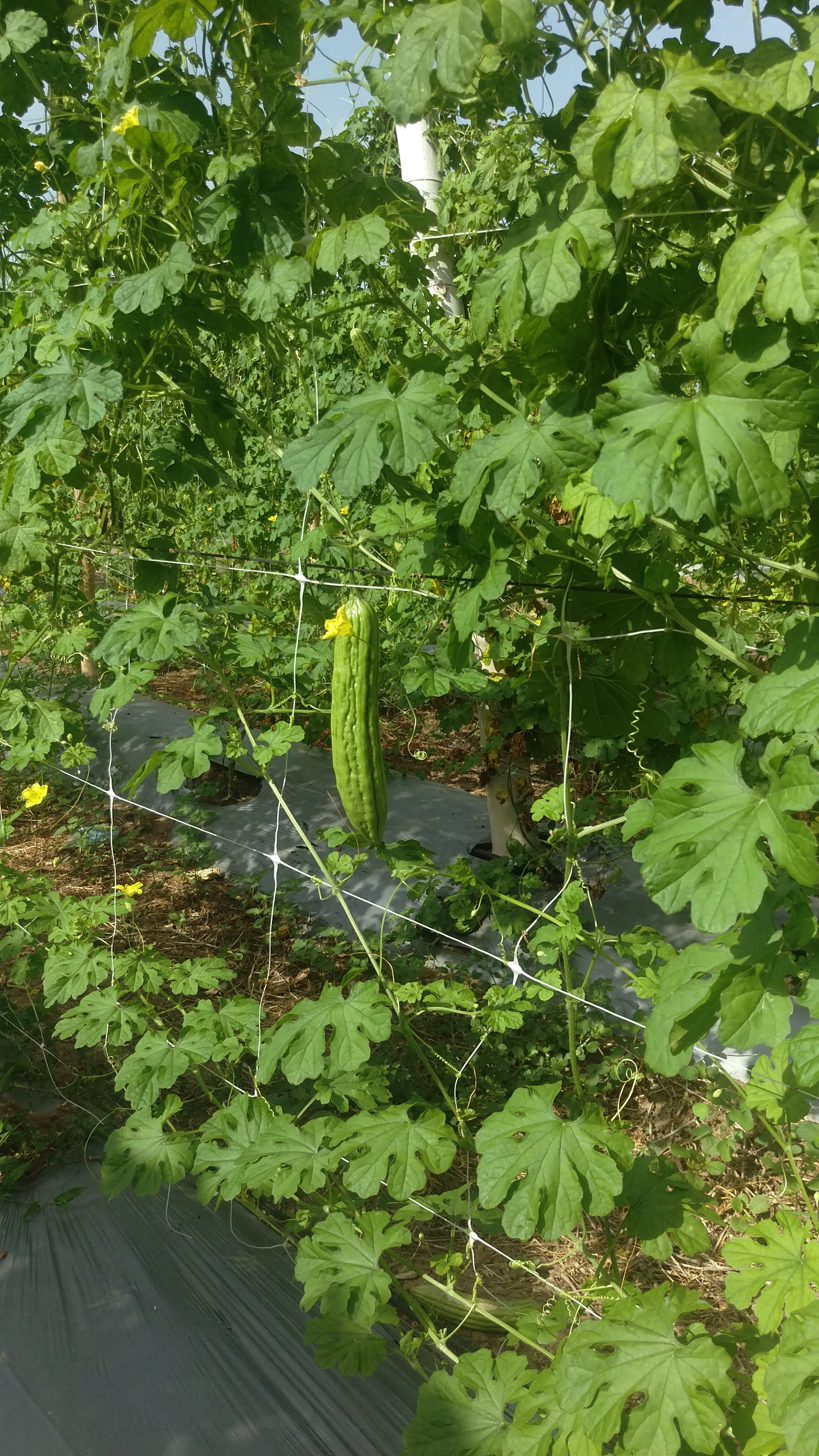
Cucurbitaeaes develop well on a trellising system

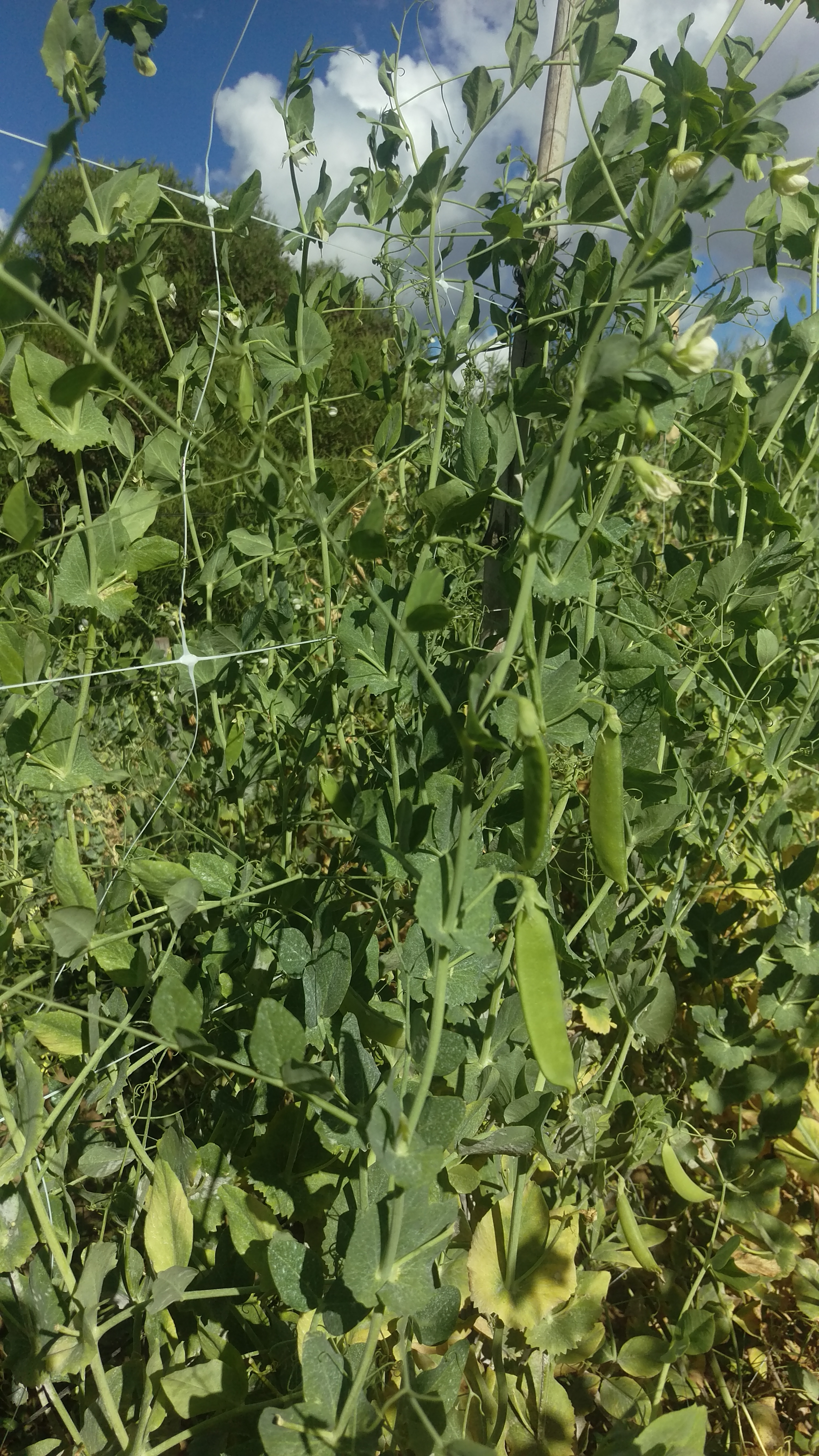
Snow peas are an example of a plant that increases yields when trellised on netting
