= Emmie Russell =

- Born: 18 August 1892; Adelaide, South Australia
- Died: 7 September 1987 (aged 95); Elizabeth Bay, New South Wales, Australia
- Other names: "Miss Russell"
- Occupation: Orthoptist

Emmie Russell (18 August 1892 – 7 September 1987) was an early Australian orthoptist and an art collector. She was the first president of the Orthoptic Association of Australia.

== Life ==
Russell was born in Adelaide. Her father, William Reid Russell, was an engineer and his brother was the Australian artist John Russell. Her mother was born Emma Goldsbrough and Emmie was the third of their four children. The family moved to Sydney. She went to her last school, Presbyterian Ladies College Croydon, in 1909.

Orthoptics was new and Ringland Anderson is credited with starting its training in 1932. He cloned the syllabus that was established in Britain and began the first Australian course at the Alfred Hospital. The new field of research was attracted women applicants including his scientific secretary Diana Craig and his friend Emmie Russell.

In 1944 she was the first president of the Orthoptic Association of Australia (OAA) with Diana Craig as the OAA's first secretary. She served for two years. She and Diana Craig assisted the Royal Australian Air Force in checking the eyesight of their pilots.

Russell was awarded honorary life membership of the OAA in 1959.

== Death and legacies ==
Her uncle John's paintings had been championed by his cousin the Sydney artist Thea Proctor who died in 1966. As a result of their work and her interest Emmie obtained a large collection of paintings by Thea Proctor and her uncle John Russell. She donated many of them to the National Gallery of Australia and the Art Gallery of New South Wales.

The legacy of her work which she retired from in 1956 was added to as she encouraged the following generations of orthoptists. She funded and set in motion the Emmie Russell Prize that was awarded the best scientific paper presented at an OAA meeting by a new member. The first winner was Margaret Kirkland in 1957.

Russell died in Elizabeth Bay in 1987 and she left a bequest to what became the Emmie Russell Department of Orthoptics at the Royal Alexandra Hospital for Children.
