= Marianna Russell =

Italian-French artist's model (1865–1908)

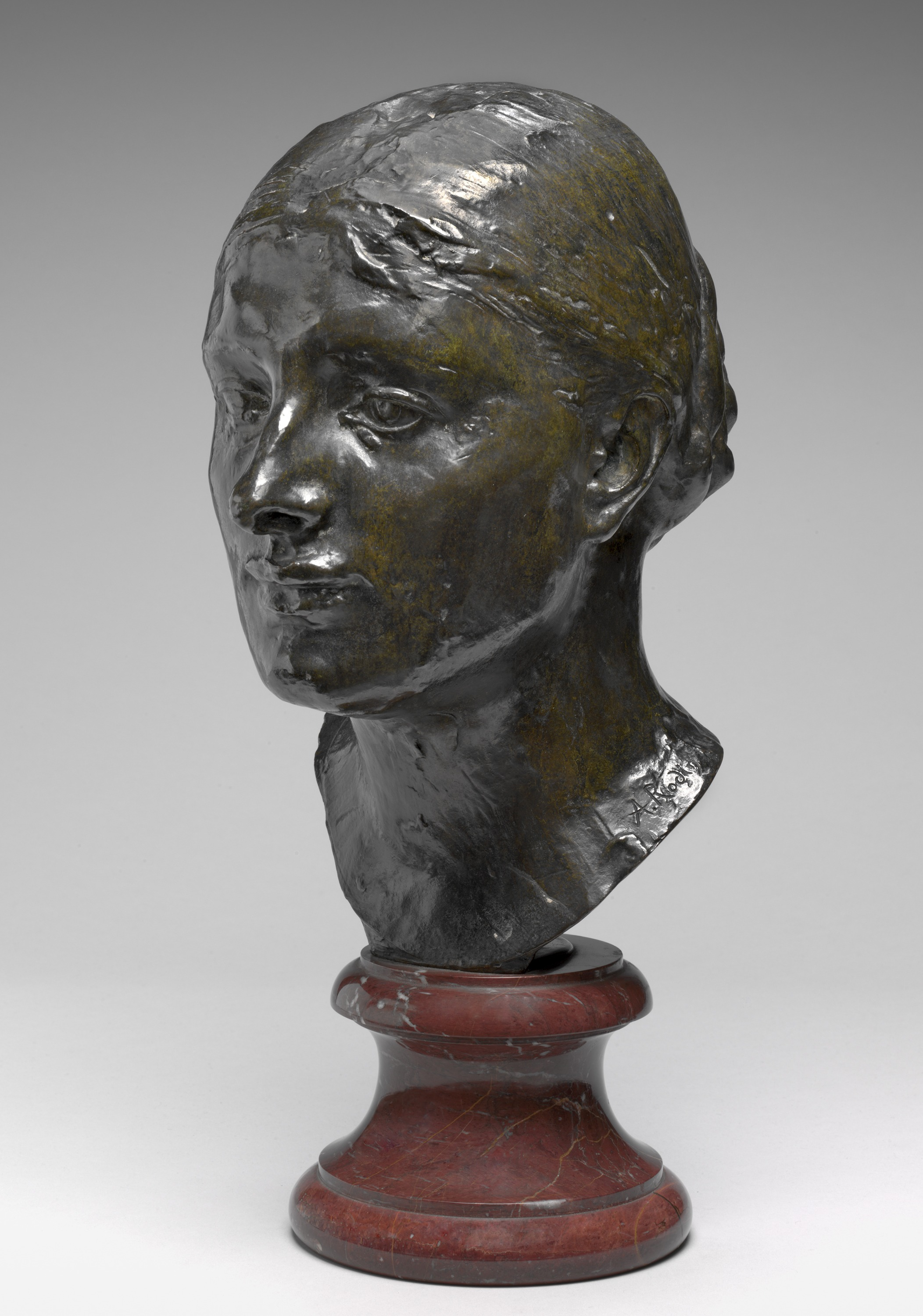
Bust of Marianna Russell sculpted by Auguste Rodin

Marianna Russell, born Anna Maria Antonietta Mattiocco (2 June 1865 Cassino Italy - 30 March 1908 Paris), also known as Marianna Antonietta Mattiocco, and Marianna Russell following her marriage to the Australian painter, John Russell, was a model for many prominent artists in France, supposedly the favorite model of Auguste Rodin, and was renowned as a great beauty. She sometimes used Marianna Mattiocco Della Torre as a professional name. She bore eleven children, six of whom survived to adulthood.

== Biography ==
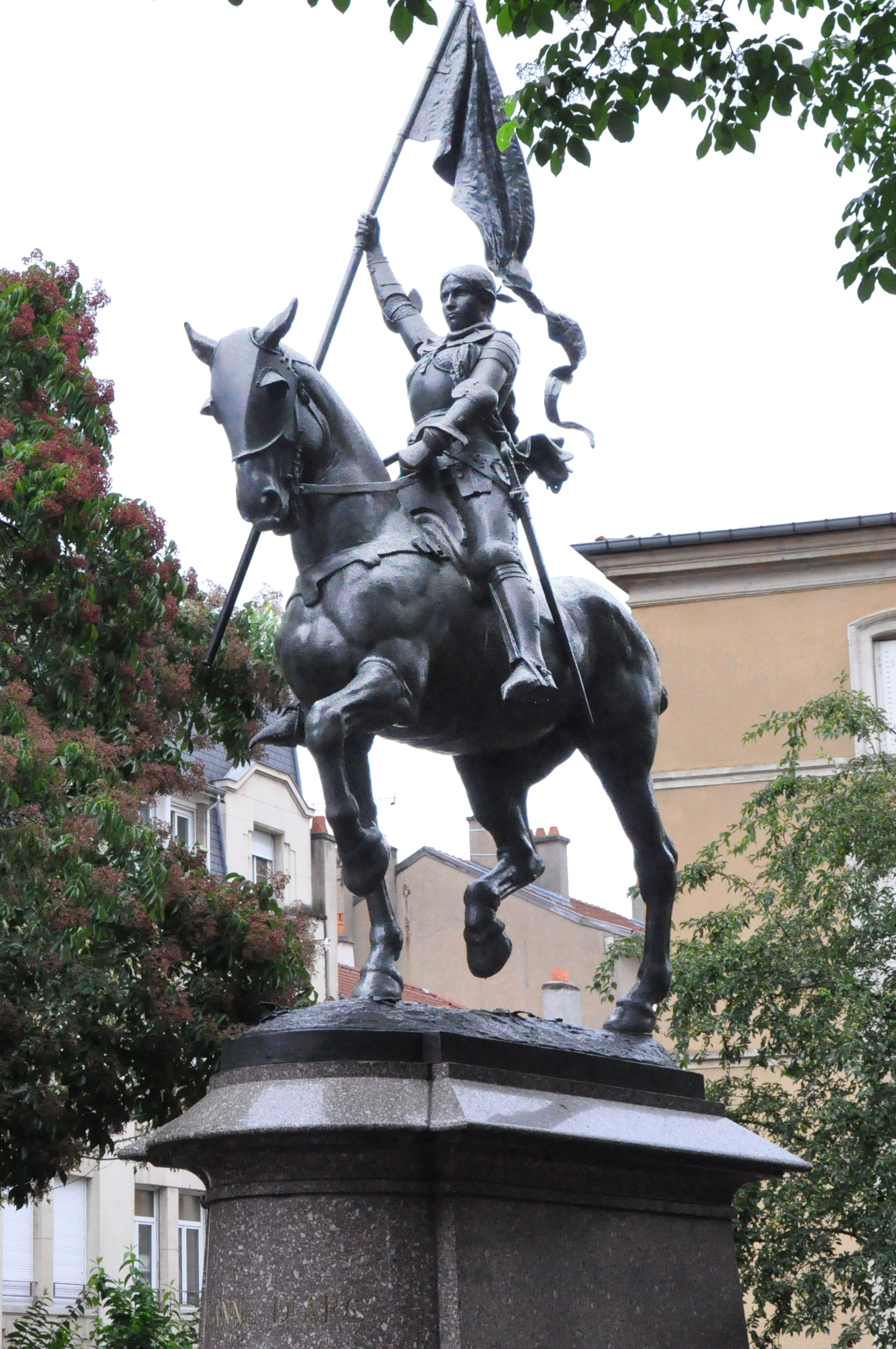
Russell posed for the Nancy, France, rendition of the statue, Jeanne d'Arc, by Emmanuel Frémiet

Russell was born on 2 June 1865 in Cassino, Kingdom of Italy, in the province of Terra di Lavoro. In Paris, she met the Australian painter John Russell in 1884. She became his lover and his model. In 1888, after the birth of two children, they married in Paris.

Claude Monet spoke highly of her beauty, and the sculptor Auguste Rodin used Russell several times as his model, notably for a bust in silver in 1888, a bust entitled Mrs. Russell (1888), Pallas at Parthenon, Minerva, and also of Ceres in 1896. An enduring friendship developed among Rodin, Marianna, and her husband.

Russell sometimes used the professional name of Marianna Mattiocco Della Torre. She also was the model of the British artist Harry Bates, and Carolus-Duran. She also posed for the Nancy, France, rendition of the equestrian sculpture, Jeanne d'Arc, by Emmanuel Frémiet, that was completed in 1889.

Leaving Paris in 1888, Marianna and John Russell settled on the island of Belle-Ile, off the coast of Brittany. They designed and built a large and comfortable house at Goulphar, in which they brought up their daughter and five sons. They also offered hospitality to many visiting artists, sometimes described as establishing an artist colony.

On 30 March 1908 Russell died from cancer in Paris at the age of forty-two. By her own wish, she was buried close to their home on Belle-Ile, in Bangor.

== Bibliography ==
- Daniel Wildenstein, Monet, vie et œuvre Bibliothèque des Arts, Lausanne, 1979
- Elizabeth Salter, The Lost Impressionist, Angus & Robertson U.K., 1976
- Claude-Guy Onfray, Russell ou la lumière en heritage, Le Livre d'histoire, Paris, 1995, ISBN 2-84178-019-8
- La Lettre de l'Association John et Marianna Russell (1988–2019) (Bibliographie nationale française 38888130-02-05014)
- Christina Buley-Uribe, Mes sœurs divines, Rodin et 99 femmes de son entourage, Editions du relief, Paris, 2013, ISBN 978-2-35904-031-9

== Websites ==
- Marianna Russell, the bust as Pallas at Parthenon, Rodin Museum, Paris
