= Vincent van Gogh (Russell) =

1886 painting by John Russell

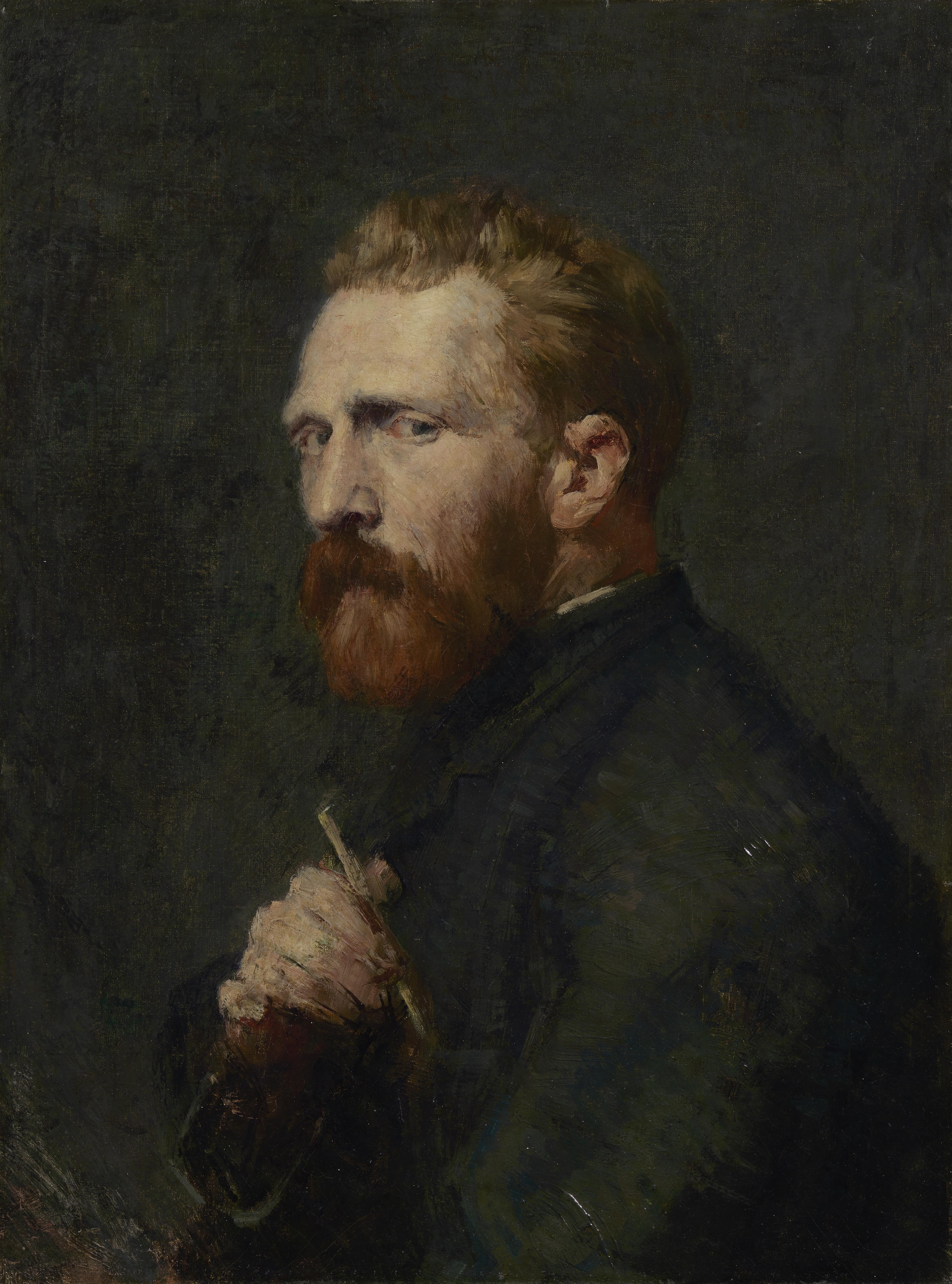
- Artist: John Russell
- Year: 1886
- Medium: Oil on canvas
- Dimensions: 60.1 cm × 45.6 cm (23.6 in × 17.9 in)
- Location: Van Gogh Museum, Amsterdam

Vincent van Gogh is an 1886 oil on canvas portrait painting by Australian artist John Russell. It depicts Dutch artist Vincent van Gogh, who befriended Russell after meeting him at Fernand Cormon's atelier in Paris, which they both attended. Painted in a realist and academic manner, the portrait shows hints of the impressionist techniques that Russell and Van Gogh began experimenting with in the latter half of the 1880s.

It is the earliest of three portraits painted of Van Gogh from life by his contemporaries, the other two being Henri de Toulouse-Lautrec's Portrait of Vincent van Gogh (1887) and Paul Gauguin's The Painter of Sunflowers (1888). Van Gogh seems to have been particularly attached to Russell's portrait, which the Australian gifted to him as a mark of their friendship. The painting passed from Van Gogh to his brother Theo, then to their family, and is now in the permanent collection of the Van Gogh Museum in Amsterdam.

== Background ==
Russell was born into a wealthy engineering family in 1858 in Sydney, New South Wales. The family business, P.N. Russell & Co, was responsible for much of the city's 19th-century ironwork. Although Russell had a strong interest in art from an early age, he met his parents' expectations and trained in the 1870s to become an engineer. His father’s death in December 1879 left him with a sizeable inheritance and gave him the freedom to travel and become an artist. He went to London in 1881 and enrolled at the Slade School of Fine Art, attending classes sporadically over several months, then returned to Sydney in 1882 before touring Europe the following year with fellow Australian artist Tom Roberts. In 1885, Russell moved to Paris to study under Fernand Cormon, whose small, all-French studio school was considered an unusual choice for international students in Paris, the majority of whom wanted to attend the elite Académie Julian. According to Russell expert Sarah Turnbull, his decision to study at Cormon's is "revealing – it shows guts and cultural openness."

During his first year at Cormon's, Russell studied alongside the likes of Henri de Toulouse-Lautrec and Émile Bernard. In 1886, they were joined by Dutch artist Vincent van Gogh, who quickly developed a reputation at the school for his intense and eccentric nature. While some of the French students shunned Van Gogh, Russell "took him under his wing" and built a rapport with the Dutchman. Their shared status as non-French outsiders at the school helped strengthen their bond, and they were also older than the average student, Van Gogh being 33 years old in 1886 and Russell 28. As such, they shared an allegiance to an older generation of artists, especially the French painter of peasant farmers, Jean-François Millet, and had a common belief in "the individual and his powers of expression, and an instinctive detachment from the life of the metropolis". Van Gogh, in a letter to his brother Theo, wrote admirably of Russell as "a countryman at heart" with "much gravity and strength" and "a certain sweetness of far-off fields". Regarded by Parisians as an archetypal "wild Australian", Russell had an "independence of spirit" that, Joanna Mendelssohn speculates, helped shape his and Van Gogh's friendship. In November 1886, Van Gogh agreed to sit for a portrait by Russell.

== Description ==
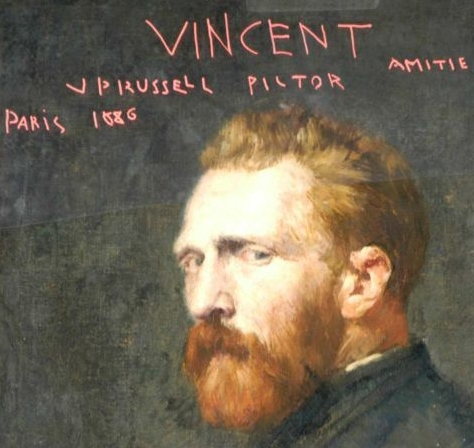
The original inscription: "Vincent, [in] friendship […]"

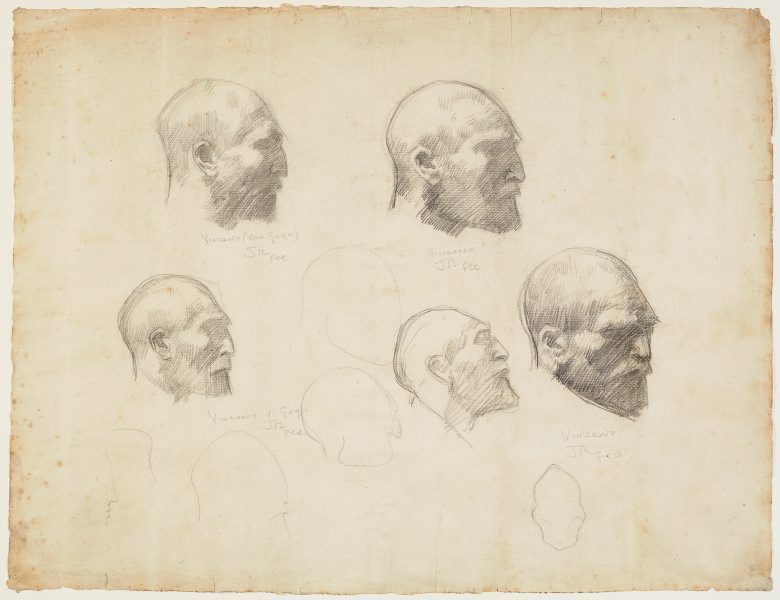
Russell drew these five studies of Van Gogh a year or so after painting his portrait. (Art Gallery of New South Wales, Sydney).

The portrait depicts Van Gogh against a dark, featureless background. In his hand, he holds a pencil, an "emblem" of the sitter. Instead of going with a customary full-face or strict profile view, Russell chose a three-quarter view in which the sitter turns his head to look out across his shoulder at the viewer, adding a "new drama" to the formats of Russell's early portraiture. Van Gogh's "somewhat downcast and elusive" gaze also sees Russell introducing a "psychological insight" into the character of his sitter.

The painting's realism is clearly influenced by photography, although the hand and the face show impressionistic brushstrokes, foreshadowing the direction of Russell and Van Gogh's art. Russell's use of browns, reds and flesh tones are in keeping with the traditional académie palette, but the way in which the light falls across the sitter's face and hand, while completely missing the shoulder, transforms it into an unusually strong aesthetic element. According to Ann Gallaby and Robyn Sloggett, "This kind of illumination, combined with the deliberate effect of rapid brushwork as in an ébauche, suggests that the portrait is to be seen as a study in creative intensity – on the part of artist as well as sitter."

While Vincent van Gogh is still noted for its "Rembrandtesque light", specialists have pointed out that the paint has darkened over time. Scottish artist Archibald Standish Hartrick, who first met Van Gogh at Russell's studio, remarked that the painting was not so dark originally, and remembered it depicting the Dutchman in a striped blue suit. Indeed, close analysis of the painting reveals a few faint blue stripes at its lower right edge. Further analysis also shows that Russell inscribed the painting in a similar fashion to other portraits dating from his early Paris years. The inscription above Van Gogh's head, originally in red but now barely visible, include the words pictor (Latin for “painter”) and amitié (French for “friendship”).

== Provenance ==
Van Gogh was delighted with the painting, and held it in such high regard that Russell gave it to him as a mark of their friendship. Characteristically, Van Gogh insisted on an exchange rather than a gift, and allowed Russell to have some of his works. Russell chose an 1882 drawing titled Worn Out (the basis of Van Gogh's 1890 painting At Eternity's Gate), and the 1886 still life Three Pairs of Shoes. According to Cathy Peake of The Australian, Russell's choices show "how profoundly and instinctively he understood the art and ambitions of his friend." Van Gogh sent the portrait to his brother Theo, and years later reminded him in a letter to "take good care of my portrait by Russell, which means a lot to me." After Theo's death in January 1891, the painting ended up in the possession of his widow, Johanna van Gogh-Bonger, and then their son, William Vincent van Gogh. The portrait is now on permanent loan to Amsterdam's Van Gogh Museum.

== Reception and legacy ==
Russell's portrait is unique among those of Van Gogh in that it is the only one by his contemporaries in which he makes direct eye contact with the viewer. Noting Van Gogh's sharp gaze, art critic Laura Cumming said Russell's portrait provides an "intimate and intense" encounter with the artist.

In his 1939 autobiography, Hartrick called the portrait "an admirable likeness, more so than any of those by [Van Gogh] or Gauguin", and said it captured one of the Dutchman's quirks:

He had an extraordinary trick of pouring out sentences in a mixture of Dutch, English, and French, then glancing quickly at you over his shoulder and hissing through his teeth as he finished a series. In fact, when excited, he looked more than a little mad: and this look Russell had caught exactly.

Also in the 1930s, Hartrick created an ink and watercolour sketch of Van Gogh that he likely based on Russell's portrait. Today, specialists agree that Russell's portrait offers the most realistic likeness of Van Gogh.

In 2012, Brigitte Banziger and David Hulme argued that, while paintings such as Tom Roberts' Shearing the Rams (1890) or Frederick McCubbin's Down on His Luck (1889) are often called "Australia's most famous painting", Russell's Vincent van Gogh may be more deserving of the title due to its global reputation.

== See also ==
- Portraits of Vincent van Gogh

== Bibliography ==
Books

- Gallaby, Ann (2008). A Remarkable Friendship: Vincent Van Gogh and John Peter Russell. The Miegunyah Press. ISBN 9780522853766.
- Hartrick, Archibald Standish (2015). A Painter's Pilgrimage Through Fifty Years. Cambridge University Press. ISBN 9781107559783.

Journals

- Bailey, Martin (2001). "Memories of Van Gogh and Gauguin: Hartrick's Reminiscences". Van Gogh Museum Journal. Van Gogh Museum.
- Gallaby, Ann (1976). "Amitie: Russell and Van Gogh". Art Bulletin of Victoria. 17. National Gallery of Victoria.
- Gallaby, Ann; Sloggett, Robyn (1997). "John Peter Russell's Dr Will Maloney". Art Bulletin of Victoria. 37. National Gallery of Victoria.
