= John Russell (Australian painter) =

Australian painter (1858–1930)

John Peter Russell
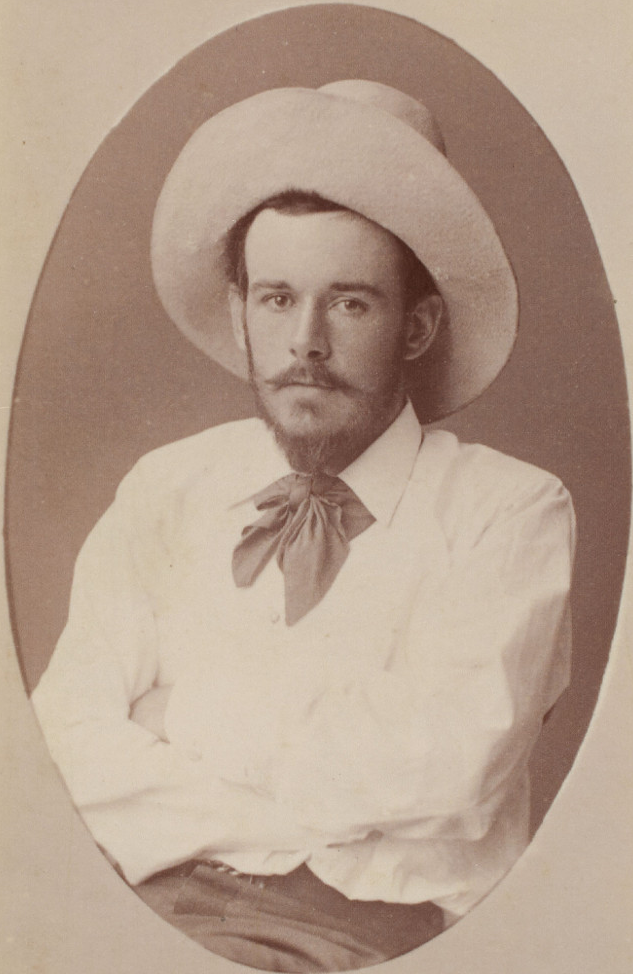
- Photograph of Russell, c. 1883
- Born: 16 June 1858; Sydney, New South Wales, Australia
- Died: 30 April 1930 (aged 71); Sydney, New South Wales, Australia
- Known for: Painting
- Movement: Impressionism
- Spouse: Marianna Antonietta Mattiocco

John Peter Russell (16 June 1858 – 30 April 1930) was an Australian impressionist painter.

Born and raised in Sydney, Russell moved to Europe in his late teenage years to attend art school. There, he befriended fellow pupil Vincent van Gogh and, in 1886, painted the first oil portrait of the artist, now held at the Van Gogh Museum. That same year, Russell painted with Claude Monet at Belle Île. Russell moved there soon after with his wife, Marianna Russell, one of sculptor Auguste Rodin's favourite models. Henri Matisse visited Russell at Belle Île in the 1890s, and later credited the Australian with introducing him to impressionist techniques and colour theory.

Despite painting prolifically and maintaining close ties with the European avant-garde, Russell rarely exhibited his works and, having received a large inheritance from his father, showed no interest in making money from art. After his wife died in 1908, Russell, grief-stricken, destroyed hundreds of his paintings. He returned to Sydney in old age where he died in relative obscurity. His cousin, Australian artist Thea Proctor, did much to posthumously promote Russell's art, and by the late 20th-century, a number of biographies and exhibitions had helped to restore his reputation as a significant artist. Today his works are held in major galleries in his home country and in Europe, including the Musée d'Orsay and the Musée Rodin in Paris.

While in Europe, Russell maintained correspondence with Australian impressionist painter Tom Roberts, updating him on developments in French impressionism. Since he remained in Europe for much of his career and descended into obscurity after his death, Russell became known as Australia's "lost impressionist".

== Life ==
=== Early years ===
Russell was born on 16 June 1858 in the Sydney suburb of Darlinghurst, the eldest of four children to Scottish-born engineer John Russell and his wife Charlotte, née Nicholl, from London. John Russell senior's engineering firm produced much of Sydney's colonial-era ironwork. Russell was also a nephew of Sir Peter Nicol Russell.

Russell was educated at the Goulburn School in Garroorigang.

=== Training in Europe ===
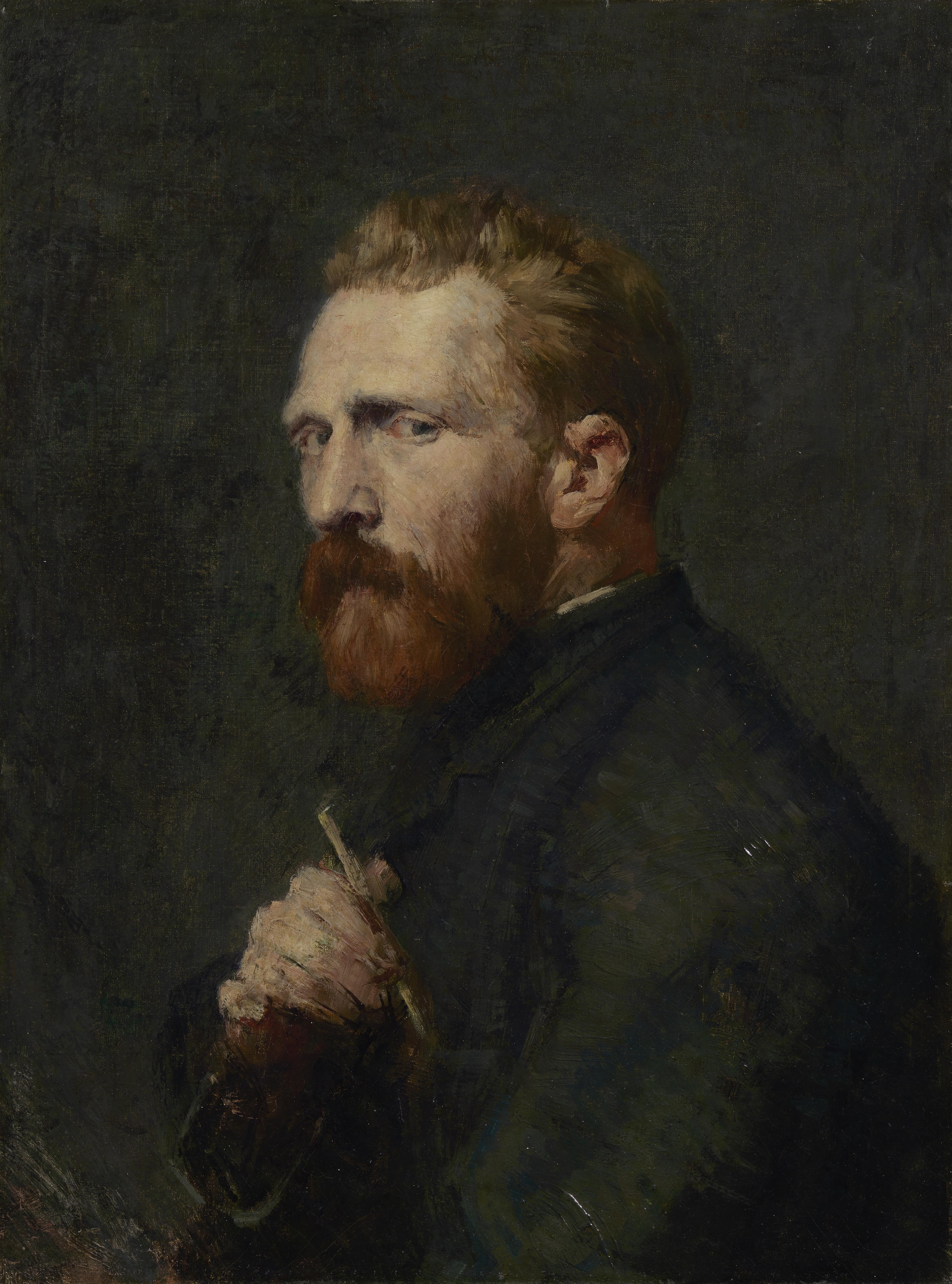
Vincent van Gogh, 1886, Van Gogh Museum

At the age of eighteen, he went to England to take up an engineering apprenticeship. In January 1881, following the death of his father, he used the considerable inheritance he received to enroll at the Slade School of Fine Art, University College London, where he studied under Alphonse Legros for three years. Russell then went to Paris to study painting under Fernand Cormon. His fellow students there included Henri de Toulouse-Lautrec, Émile Bernard, and Dutchman Vincent van Gogh, with whom he formed a lifelong friendship. The two artists particularly bonded over being foreigners in the Parisian avant-garde scene. They maintained correspondence, and some of Van Gogh's private letters reveal his deep fondness for Russell and his art.

A portrait of Van Gogh by Russell, painted in 1886, was allegedly Van Gogh's favourite depiction of himself: the Dutch artist even wrote to his brother Theo, ten months before his death, exhorting him to "take good care of my portrait by Russell, which means a lot to me". The painting of Van Gogh was acquired by the Van Gogh Museum, at Amsterdam in 1938. A sheet of portrait drawings of van Gogh is at the Art Gallery of New South Wales.

=== Belle Île ===
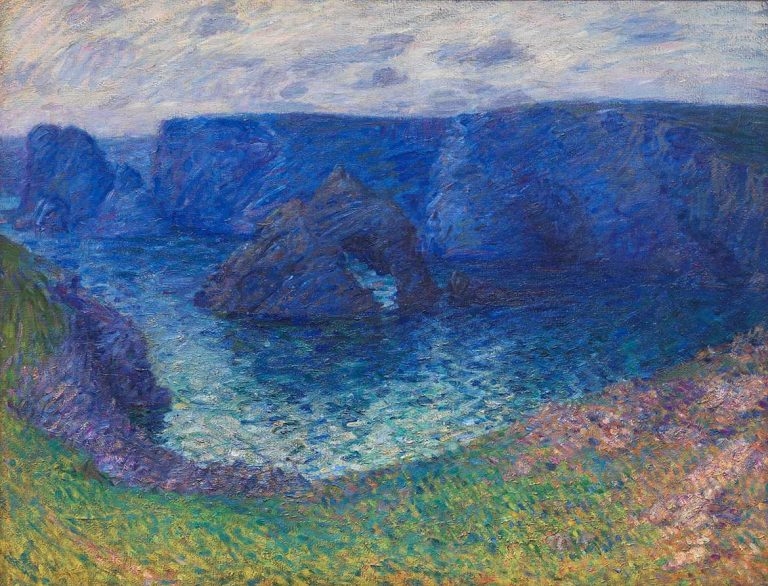
Roc Toul (Roche Guibel), 1904

Russell married the renowned beauty Marianna Antonietta Mattiocco, an Italian seamstress and model of Auguste Rodin's. They settled at Belle Île off the coast of Brittany, where he designed his own home and established an artists' colony. Russell was the first non-native to move to the island, leading locals to call his home overlooking Port Goulphar "Le Chateau de l'Anglais". He would have 11 children with Mattiocco, of whom six, five sons and a daughter, survived.

Claude Monet often worked with Russell at Belle Île and influenced his style, though it has been said that Monet preferred some of Russell's Belle Île seascapes to his own. In 1890, Russell left Belle Île and traveled to Antibes in a horse-drawn cart, where he rented a house for the winter and produced some of his most acclaimed work. Due to his substantial private income Russell did not attempt to make his pictures well known. In the 1880s and 1890s, Russell hewed closely to pure French impressionist style.

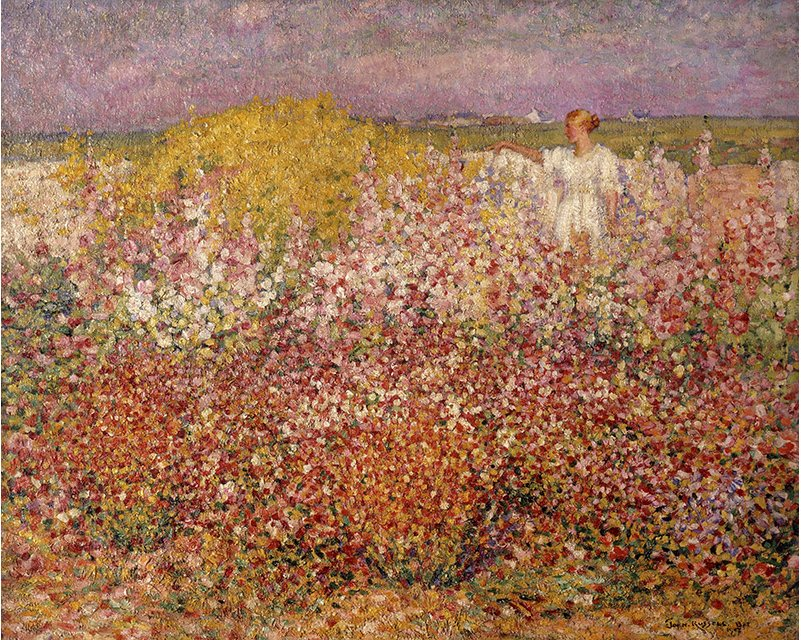
Mrs. Russell among the Flowers in the Garden of Goulphar, Belle-Île, 1907, Musée d’Orsay

In 1907, Marianna Russell died in Paris of cancer. Grief-stricken, Russell took her body to Belle Île in a rowboat and buried her next to his home. He then destroyed an estimated 400 of his oils and watercolours. Auguste Rodin despaired at the destruction of "those marvels", and in one of his final letters to Russell, said, "Your works will live, I am certain. One day you will be placed on the same level with our friends Monet, Renoir, and Van Gogh."

=== Later years ===
Russell married his second wife in 1912, the American singer Caroline de Witt Merrill, who was a friend of Russell's daughter and went by the stage name of Felize Medori. Russell and his new wife moved between Italy, Switzerland, and England, where Russell's five sons served in the Allied forces during the First World War. In 1922, Russell briefly lived in New Zealand where he helped one of his sons start a citrus farm.

In 1921, Russell returned to the Sydney area, where he lived in a fisherman's cottage in suburb of Watsons Bay and had a small wooden studio on Sydney Harbour. He suffered a fatal heart attack in 1930 while lifting rocks to build a wall outside his cottage.

== Legacy ==
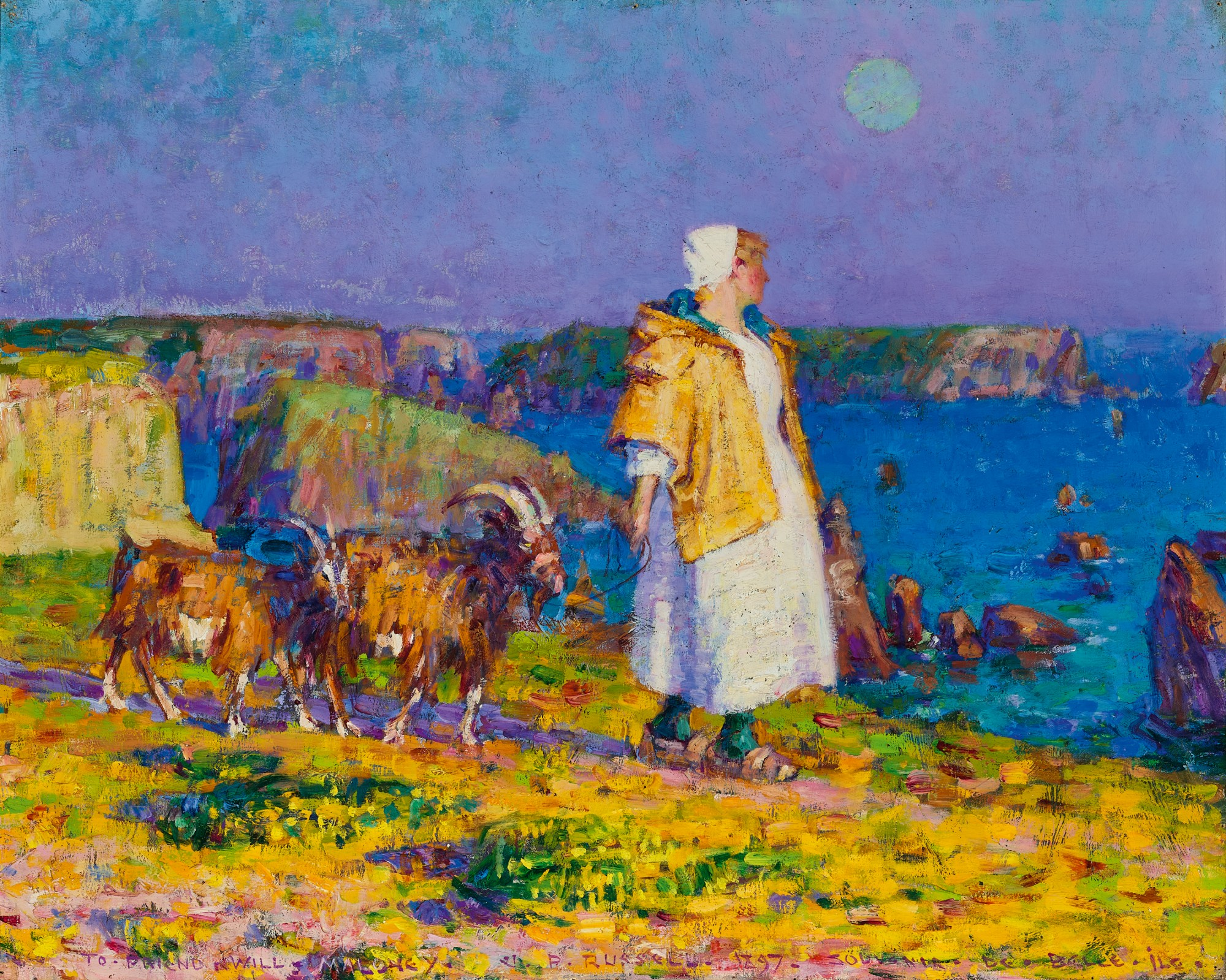
Souvenir de Belle-Île, 1897

Russell's daughter, Madame Jeanne Jouve, known in Paris as a singer, stated that he had built up a collection of impressionist works—Van Gogh, Gauguin, Bernard, Guillaumin—which he intended to give to Australia, but none is known to have survived beyond his death.

Sydney artist Thea Proctor, a cousin of Russell's, did much to promote his work in her later years. She died in 1966. Her cousin was Emmie Russell who was an orthoptist and she gained a large collection of paintings by Proctor and her uncle John Russell. She had a large collection of art that she donated to Australian galleries.

He was also a lifelong friend of Tom Roberts, one of the main figures of the Australian Heidelberg School of impressionism. Russell was not directly involved in this movement, giving him the title "Australia's Lost Impressionist".

The first feature-length documentary about Russell, Australia’s Lost Impressionist: John Russell, was released in 2018. Directed by Catherine Hunter and narrated by actor Hugo Weaving, the film was partially shot at Belle-Ile.

In 2023, Russell's 1897 painting Souvenir de Belle-Île sold at Deutscher and Hackett in Melbourne for A$3,927,273, making it the most expensive of his publicly auctioned works.

== Style and works ==
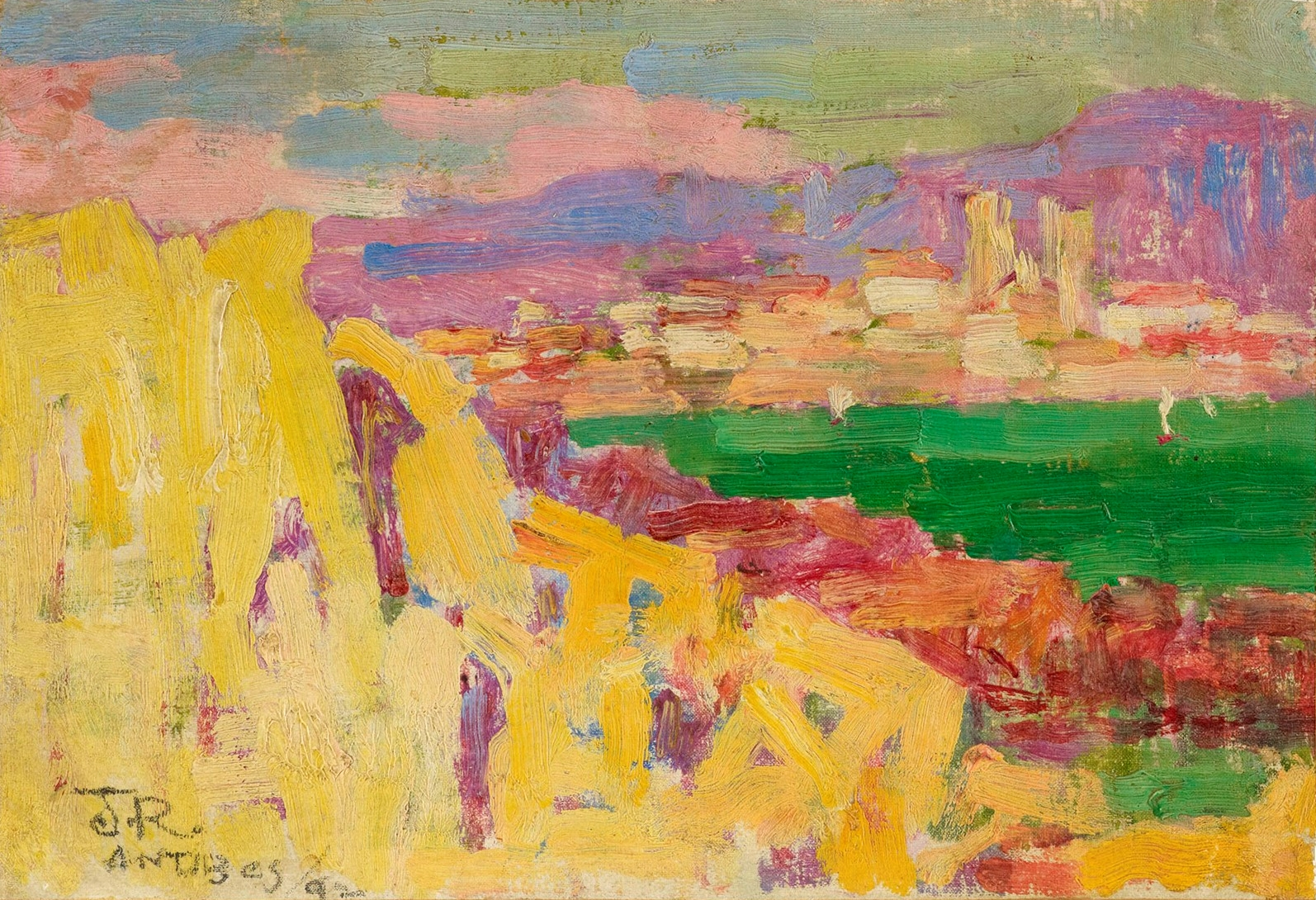
Some of Russell's work is said to have anticipated Fauvism (pictured: Antibes, c. 1890, Art Gallery of New South Wales).

Russell first became interested in impressionism in Paris, where he experimented with a variety of different techniques. In 1885, he made a trip to Cornwall and visited plein air colonies. In 1897 and 1898 Henri Matisse visited Belle Île. Russell introduced him to impressionism and to the work of Van Gogh (who was relatively unknown at the time). Matisse's style changed radically, and he would later say "Russell was my teacher, and Russell explained colour theory to me." Russell was particularly known for his skill as a colourist; during his stay on Belle Île he ground and mixed all his own pigments.

In the late 1880s, he met Monet who would later become a big name in the field. Russell referred to Monet as "the prince of Impressionists," while they painted. They were close friends and often saw each other. Russell later bought land on the island where the two met and lived there for the next twenty years. He visited places around his now home and was inspired by the clear light and bright colors. This led to Russell devoting himself to painting en plein air and showed his growth as an artist.

== Gallery ==
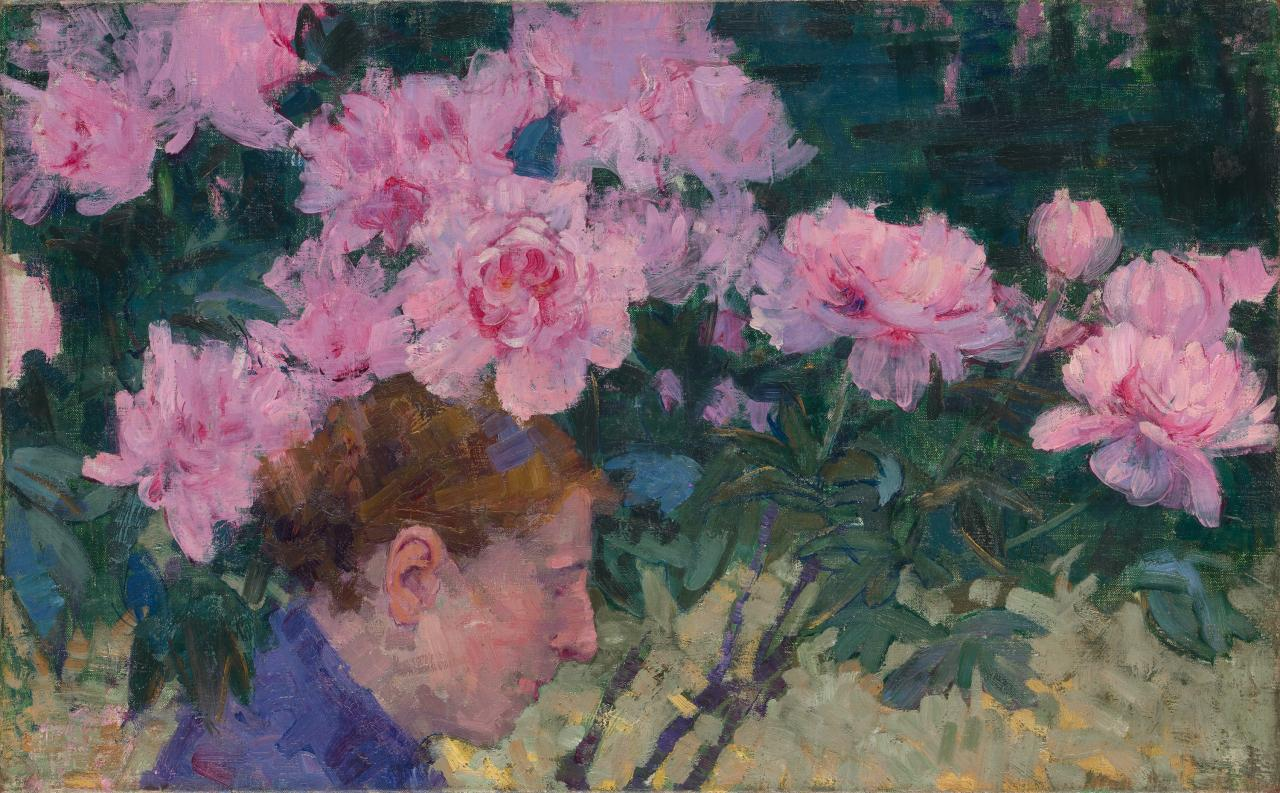
Peonies and Head of a Woman, 1887, National Gallery of Victoria

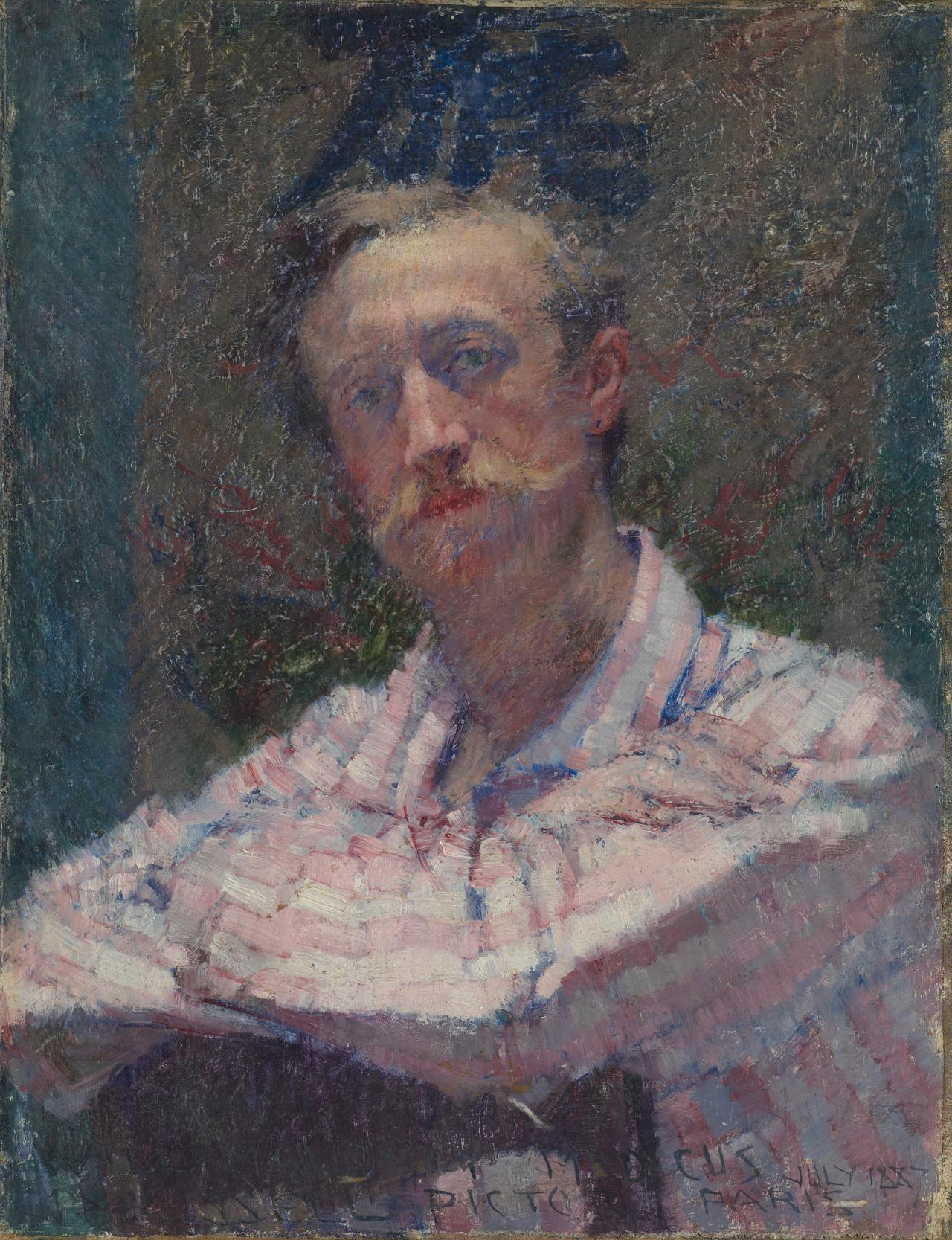
Dr Will Maloney, 1887, National Gallery of Victoria

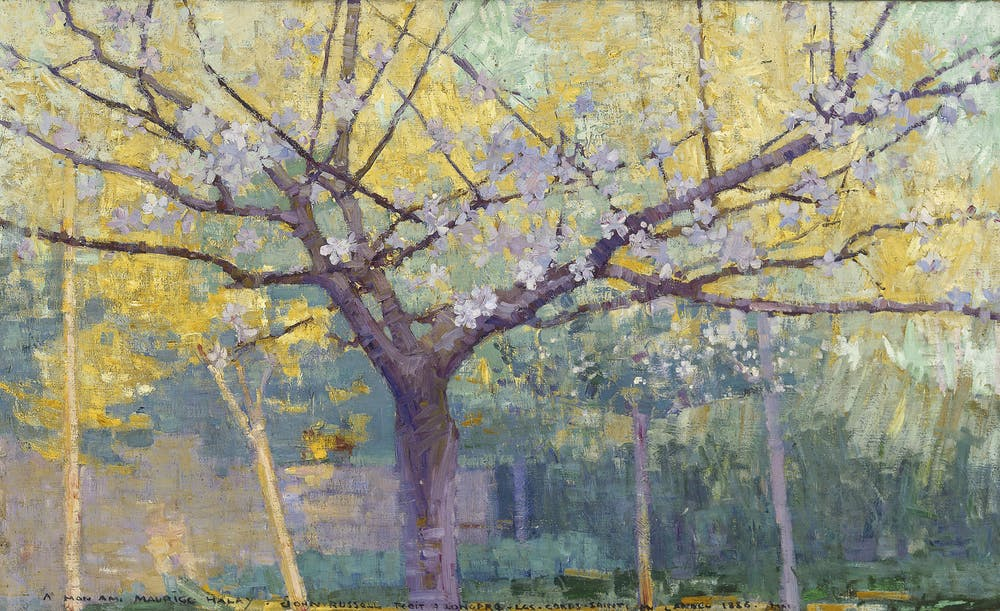
The garden, Longpré-les-Corps-Saints, 1887, private collection

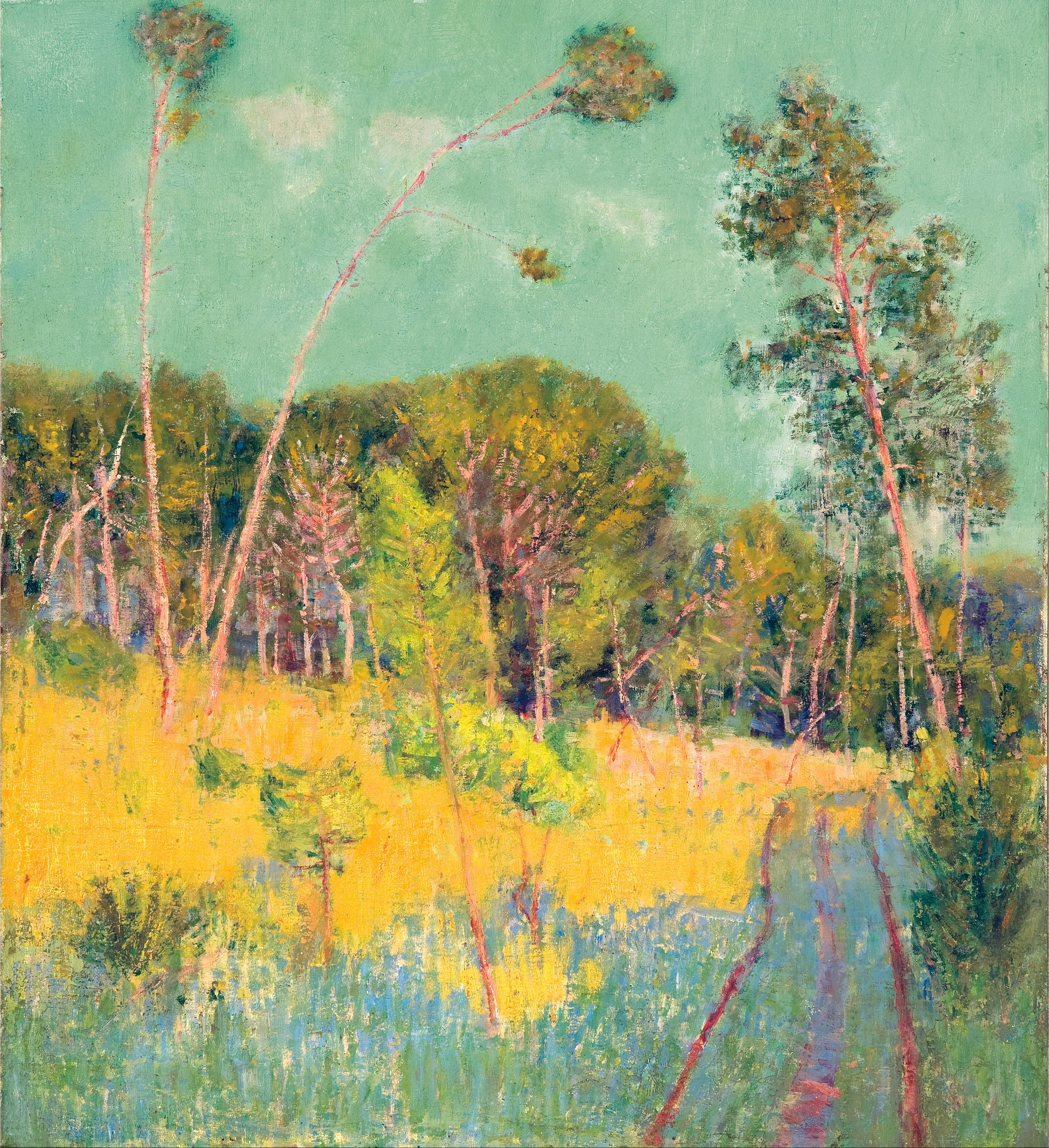
A Clearing in the Forest, 1891, Art Gallery of South Australia

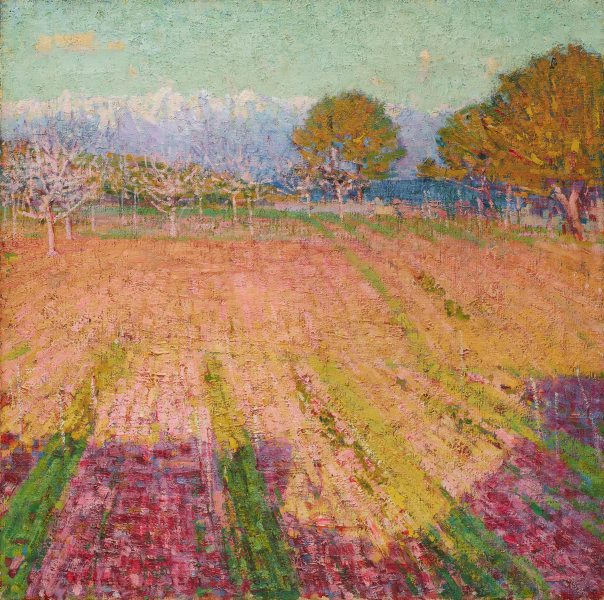
In the Afternoon, Art Gallery of New South Wales

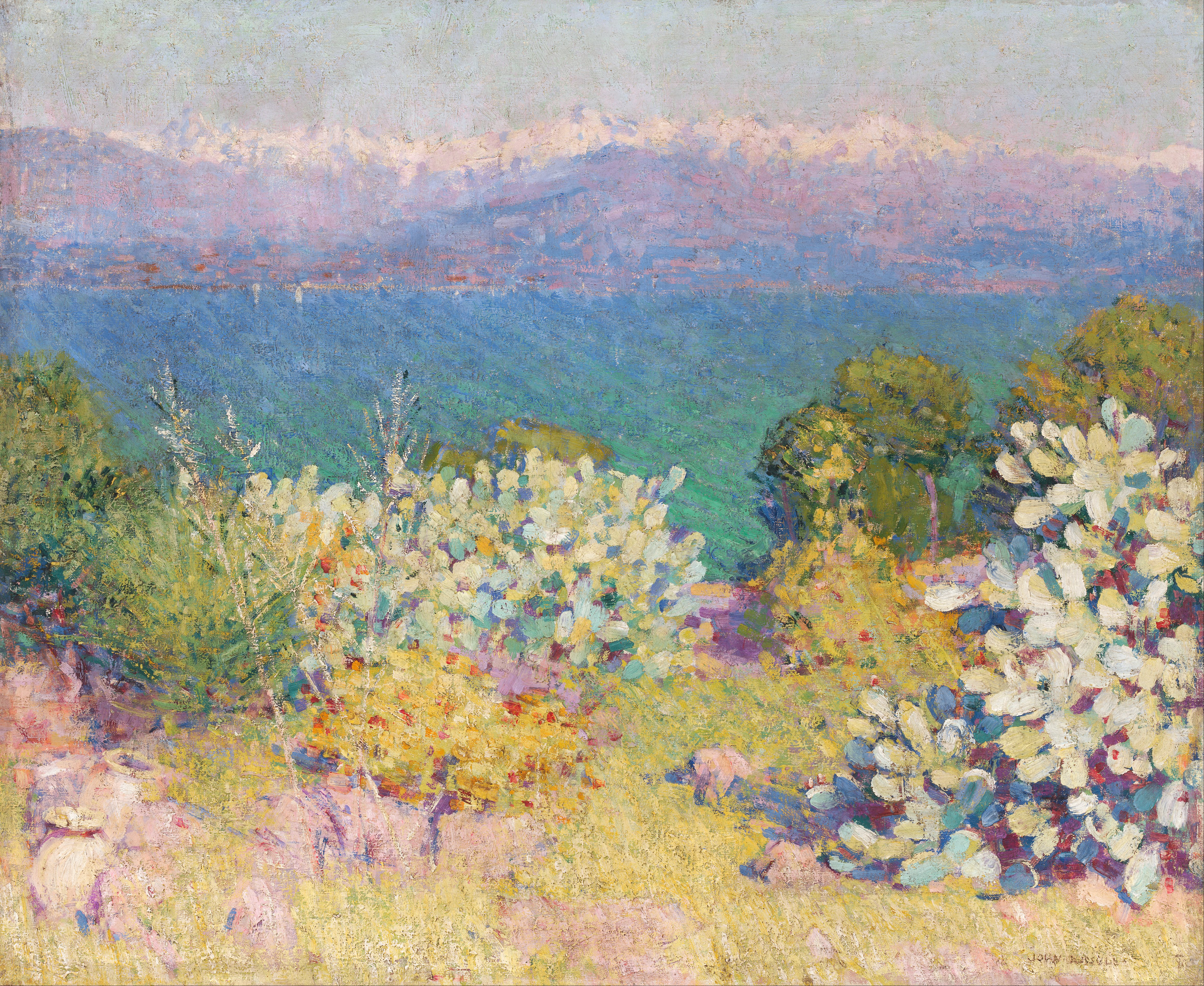
In the Morning, Alpes Maritimes from Antibes, c. 1891

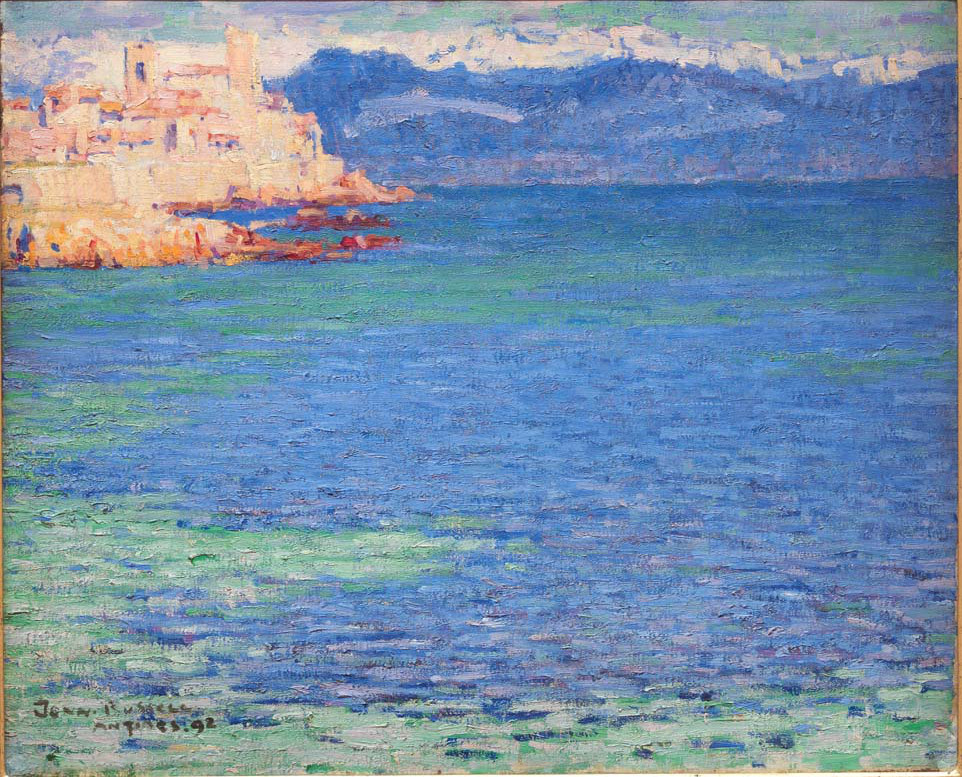
Antibes, 1892, Queensland Art Gallery

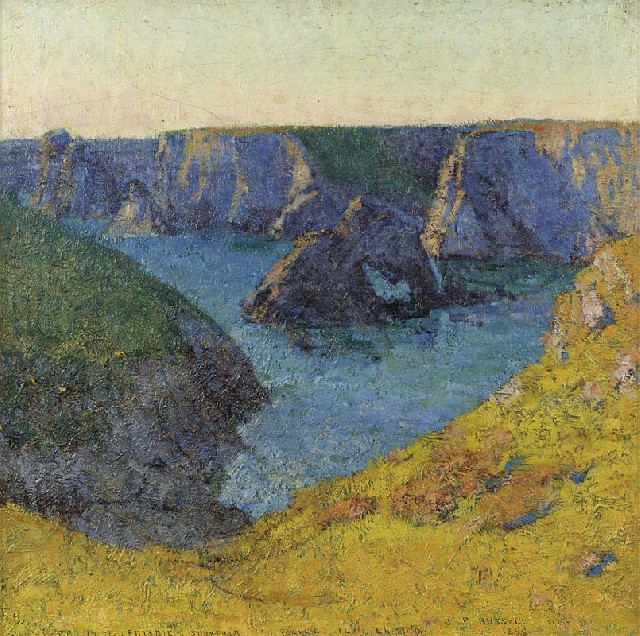
Belle Ile en mer, 1898

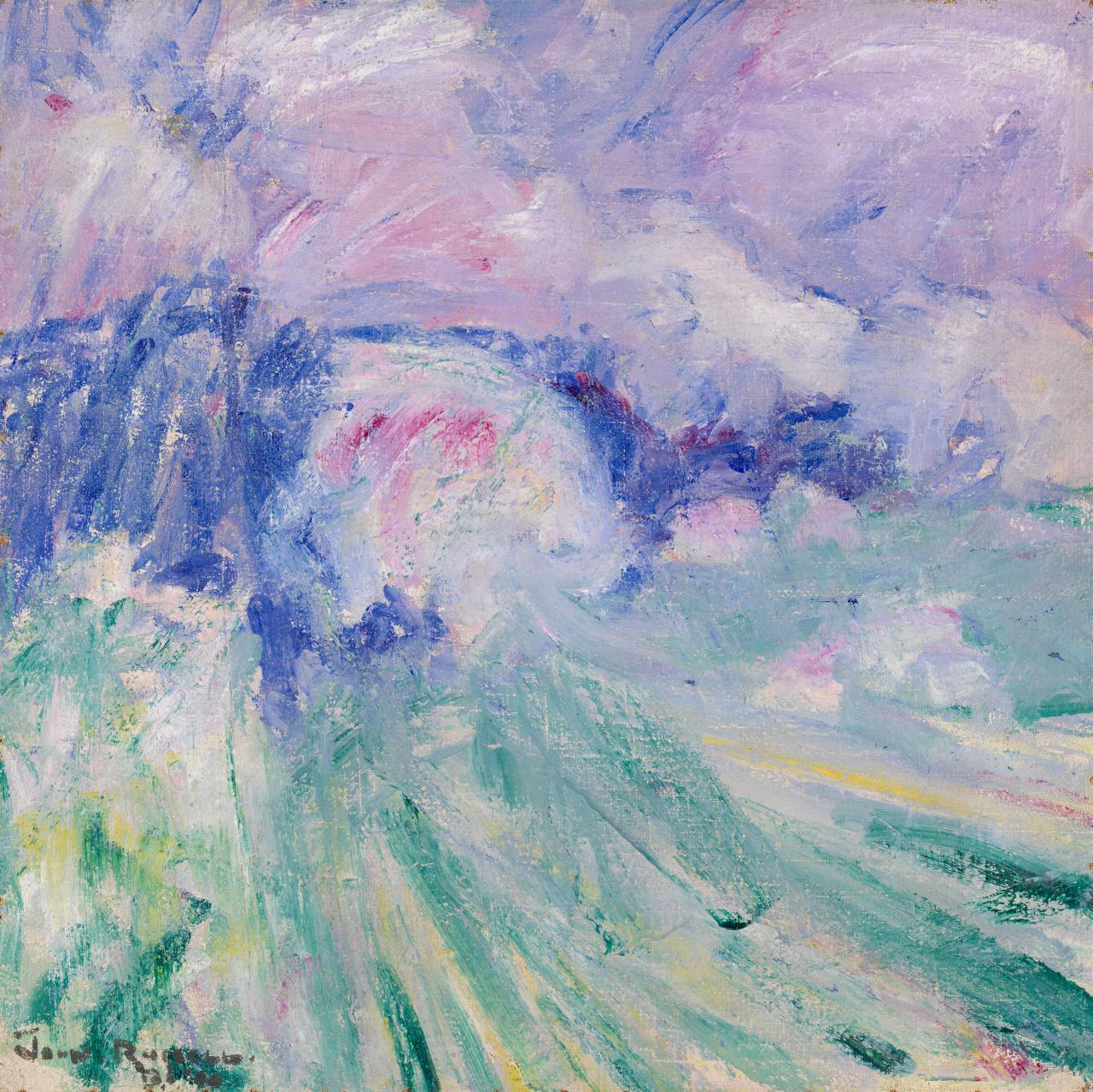
Rough Sea, Belle-Île, 1900, National Gallery of Victoria

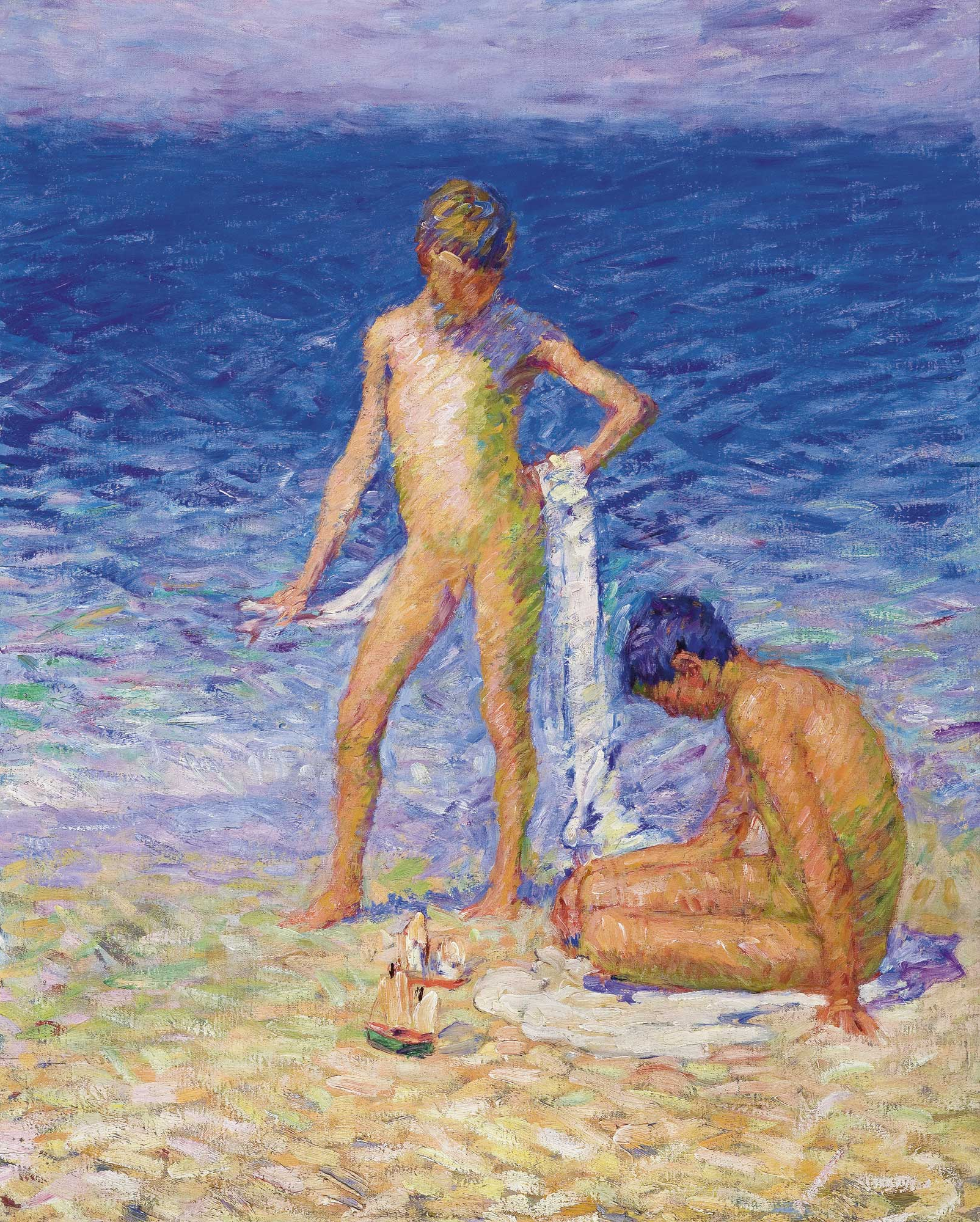
Boys on the Beach, Belle Ile, c. 1900

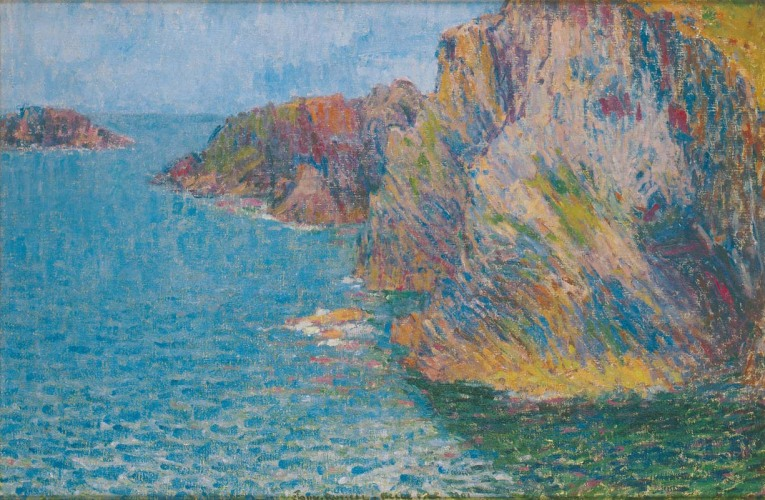
La Pointe de Morestil, Calm Sea, 1901

== See also ==
- Visual arts of Australia
