= Diana Craig =

Australian orthoptist (1912–1992)

- Born: Diana Sophy Mann; 11 February 1912; South Yarra, Victoria, Australia
- Died: 7 February 1992 (aged 79); Alphington, Victoria, Australia
- Education: University of Melbourne
- Known for: leading the Orthoptic Association of Australia
- Spouse: James Douglas Craig

Diana Sophy Craig born Diana Sophy Mann (11 February 1912 – 7 February 1992) was an Australian orthoptist.

== Life ==
Craig was born in the Melbourne suburb of South Yarra in 1912. Her Australian-born parents were Adeline Mary (born Raleigh) and Frederick Mann. Her father was a noted lawyer who became chief justice of Victoria. She went to school at Clyde School for Girls but this did not provide sufficient knowledge for her to begin a career in science. She enrolled at what was later called the Royal Melbourne Institute of Technology and that allowed her to go on to the University of Melbourne where she studied a wide variety of sciences and graduated in 1932.

She became the scientific secretary to J. Ringland Anderson which gave her a good understanding of ophthalmology. Orthoptics was new and Ringland Anderson is credited with starting its training in 1932. The new field of research was attracting women including Craig and Emmie Russell. Craig later worked with Sheila Mayou.

In 1944 she was a founding member of the Orthoptic Association of Australia (OAA) with Emmie Russell who as President and she was the OAA's first secretary. She was later elected president and she served three terms starting in 1948, 1954 and 1968. During the 1970s she was in private practice. She assisted the RAAF in checking the eyesight of their patients and she re-enrolled at the University of Melbourne. She studied and graduated in psychology.

She became the editor of the OAA's journal and served from 1973 to 1982. She retired that year and the OAA who had created the Mary Wesson award made her the first recipient.

== Death and legacy ==
Craig died a widow in Alphington in 1992. The Diana Craig prize was created in the following year by the OAA and it is given to high achieving students.
