= Frederick Mann =

The Honourable Sir Frederick Mann KCMG

Chief Justice of Victoria
- In office October 1935 – January 1944
- Preceded by: William Irvine
- Succeeded by: Sir Edmund Herring

Lieutenant Governor of Victoria
- In office 22 July 1919 – 12 May 1936

Justice of the Supreme Court of Victoria
- In office 22 July 1919 – 1935

Personal details
- Born: 2 May 1869 Mount Gambier, South Australia
- Died: 29 May 1958 (aged 89) South Yarra, Victoria

Sir Frederick Wollaston Mann KCMG (2 May 1869 – 29 May 1958) was the chief justice of the Australian state of Victoria between 1 October 1935 and 31 January 1944. He was also Victoria’s lieutenant governor between 12 May 1936 and May 1945. Mann was nicknamed the “Little Gentleman” because of his height (he was 168 cm tall) and he was unfailingly courteous. He had a reputation of being a careful judge delivering decisions of precision and clarity. In 1935, he became the first Australian born person to become chief justice of Victoria.

== Early years ==
Mann was born at Mount Gambier, South Australia. He was the son of Gilbert Hill Cheke Mann and Sophia Charlotte Mann (nee Wollaston). Mann’s maternal grandfather was John Ramsden Wollaston, a pioneering Anglican archdeacon in Western Australia. Mann’s younger brother was to become an icon of early Australian radio broadcasting. Mann began his education at Christ Church Grammar School in Mount Gambier. Later he transferred to the public education system when he transferred to Mount Gambier Public School. After leaving school, he studied privately at home.

He left South Australia and moved to Melbourne in 1887 where he obtained work as a tally clerk. He then worked as a clerk in the Crown Law Department of the Victorian Government. Whilst working, he studied at the University of Melbourne and graduated with a Bachelor of Arts in 1894. In 1895 he won the Supreme Court prize at the University of Melbourne. He completed his Bachelor of Laws in 1896 and a Master of Laws in 1898. He was called to the Victorian Bar in 1896 but continued working for the State Government rather than practice in his own right.

== Military service ==
He was commissioned as a lieutenant in the 4th Victorian Battalion of the Australian Imperial Regiment known as the “4th Vic.Imperial Bushmen “ He departed Melbourne on 1 May 1900 in the transport “Victorian’. He served in the Second Boer War for sixteen months until he was wounded at Hartbeesfontein on 16 February 1901. He was awarded the Queen's South Africa Medal. On his return to Australia in November, he set up chambers in Melbourne as a barrister. As a barrister, he specialized in both common law and Equity cases, and became known for his “careful cross-examination technique”.

On 8 April 1911 he married Adeline Mary Raleigh at All Saints Church of England in East St Kilda. They had five children from the marriage and the first was the orthoptist Diana Craig.

== Judicial career ==
On 22 July 1919, Mann was appointed a justice of the Supreme Court of Victoria. In 1931 he became the Chairman of the Court of Industrial Appeal and held that appointment until 1933. He was knighted in the King's Birthday Honours of June 1933, formally receiving his knighthood by Letters Patent on 12 July 1933. Between 1923 and 1934, he acted as Chief Justice of Victoria on many occasions. He was appointed Chief Justice in 1935 in succession to Sir William Irvine. In the same year he became president of the Melbourne Club. In 1936, he denounced Victorian police criminal investigation methods of the time as “crude, untrained and overly reliant upon informers and physical coercion”. Police at that time were tempted to obtain convictions through extorting confessions rather than through investigation. On 30 March 1936 he was appointed Lieutenant Governor of Victoria, taking office on 12 May 1936. The Melbourne newspaper “The Sun” described him as 'lucid, fearless, cold, crisp, alert, analytical, unostentatious and retiring … dignified and decorous'. Mann was appointed Knight Commander of the Order of St Michael and St George (KCMG) in the Coronation Honours of 1937. In 1941 Mann heard the matter of Trustee's Executors & Agency Co Ltd v Reilly. In that case, he was called upon to decide what the phrase “in respect of” meant. He said:

“the words ‘in respect of’ are diffecult (sic) of definition, but they have the widest possible meaning of any expression intended to convey some connection or relation between the two subject matters to which the words refer”.

Mann’s dictum in that case on the definition of the meaning of the words “in respect of” is still used today.

Mann retired as chief justice in January 1944 and retired as lieutenant-governor in May 1945. In later years he became a trustee of the Melbourne Botanical Gardens Maud Gibson Trust. He died in 1958 at his home in the Melbourne suburb of South Yarra.

Legal offices
Preceded by Sir William Irvine	Chief Justice of the Supreme Court of Victoria; 1935–1944	Succeeded by Sir Edmund Herring
Government offices
Preceded by Sir William Irvine	Lieutenant-Governor of Victoria; 1936–1945	Succeeded by Sir Edmund Herring
