= Battle of Hartbeesfontein =

Battle during the Second Boer War

- Part of Second Boer War
Date	17 February 1901
Location	Hartbeesfontein, South African Republic
Result	British victory

Belligerents
British Empire: Victoria	South African Republic

Commanders and leaders
Paul Methuen	P J de Villiers

Strength
600	1,500

Casualties and losses
16 killed 32 wounded	18 killed Unknown wounded

The Battle of Hartbeesfontein, was the scene of a large skirmish during the Second Boer War which took place on February 17, 1901.

== Events ==
Background

In early February 1901 Lord Methuen had embarked on a lengthy trek in the South Western Transvaal marching towards Klerksdorp. On his way Methuen's force had captured a on 16 February 1901, Lord Methuen's column, having selected a different route through hilly country, was confronted by a Boer force at Hartbeesfontein.

Battle

There was no sign of the Boers until the Imperial Yeomanry advanced. A unit led by Captain Poison, were descending the 500 ft escarpment above town, when they were confronted by entrenched Boer forces of about 1,500 men, over double their number. They were fired upon by Boer Mausers – the Yeomanry retreated to find cover. Methuen tried to take the left position but the 5th battalion Yeomanry Shropshire, Worcestershire and Northumberland could get no further than the spurs and flanks of the hill due to heavy Boer rifle fire.

From dawn to 10pm both sides exchanged fire when Methuen ordered two companies of Major Murray's convoy guard to occupy a strategic position. The British artillery came into action and shelled the Boer positions while the pressure was taken off the Yeomanry by the advance of the infantry and support offered by the 5th Battalion, Imperial Yeomanry. Meanwhile the 10th battalion assisted by Australian troops on the right, managed to storm one of the crests but was in danger of being fired upon their left flanks. The 5th however launched an attack and combined with the 10th battalion, despite fierce resistance, managed to turn the Boer positions was turned who retreated.

Aftermath

The British casualties in total were sixteen dead and thirty two wounded; of these seven members of the Yeomanry were killed or died of wounds. Australian losses were ten casualties. Boer losses were eighteen killed and unknown number of wounded. The British having secured the pass also captured ample Boer supplies of stock and grain. Methuen's force entered Klerksdorp on the following day and afterwards continued his march on Pretoria.

Notable participants

- Sir Frederick Mann - later the Lieutenant Governor of Victoria was wounded during the battle and awarded the Queen's South Africa Medal.
